= Social ownership =

Ownership of the means of production by society

Social ownership is a type of property where an asset is recognized to be in the possession of society as a whole rather than individual members or groups within it. Social ownership of the means of production is the defining characteristic of a socialist economy, and can take the form of community ownership, state ownership, common ownership, employee ownership, cooperative ownership, and citizen ownership of equity. Within the context of socialist economics it refers particularly to the appropriation of the surplus product produced by the means of production (or the wealth that comes from it) to society at large or the workers themselves. Traditionally, social ownership implied that capital and factor markets would cease to exist under the assumption that market exchanges within the production process would be made redundant if capital goods were owned and integrated by a single entity or network of entities representing society. However, the articulation of models of market socialism where factor markets are utilized for allocating capital goods between socially owned enterprises broadened the definition to include autonomous entities within a market economy.

The two major forms of social ownership are society-wide public ownership and cooperative ownership. The distinction between these two forms lies in the distribution of the surplus product. With society-wide public ownership, the surplus is distributed to all members of the public through a social dividend whereas with co-operative ownership the economic surplus of an enterprise is controlled by all the worker-members of that specific enterprise.

The goal of social ownership is to eliminate the distinction between the class of private owners who are the recipients of passive property income and workers who are the recipients of labour income (wages, salaries and commissions), so that the surplus product (or economic profits in the case of market socialism) belong either to society as a whole or to the members of a given enterprise. Social ownership would enable productivity gains from labour automation to progressively reduce the average length of the working day instead of creating job insecurity and unemployment. Reduction of necessary work time is central to the Marxist concept of human freedom and overcoming alienation, a concept widely shared by Marxist and non-Marxist socialists alike.

Socialization as a process is the restructuring of the economic framework, organizational structure and institutions of an economy on a socialist basis. The comprehensive notion of socialization and the public ownership form of social ownership implies an end to the operation of the laws of capitalism, capital accumulation and the use of money and financial valuation in the production process, along with a restructuring of workplace-level organization.

== Objectives ==
Social ownership is variously advocated to end the Marxian concept of exploitation, to ensure that income distribution reflects individual contributions to the social product, to eliminate unemployment arising from technological change, to ensure a more egalitarian distribution of the economy's surplus, or to create the foundations for a non-market socialist economy.

In Karl Marx's analysis of capitalism, social ownership of the means of production emerges in response to the contradictions between socialized production and private appropriation of surplus value in capitalism. Marx argued that productivity gains arising from the substitution of variable capital (labor inputs) for constant capital (capital inputs) would cause labor displacement to outstrip the demand for labor. This process would lead to stagnant wages and rising unemployment for the working class alongside rising property income for the capitalist class, further leading to an over-accumulation of capital. Marx argued that this dynamic would reach a point where social ownership of the highly automated means of production would be necessitated to resolve this contradiction and resulting social strife. Thus, the Marxist case for social ownership and socialism is not based on any moral critique of the distribution of property income (wealth) in capitalism, but rather on a systematic analysis of the development and limits of the dynamic of capital accumulation.

For Marx, social ownership would lay the foundations for the transcendence of the capitalist law of value and the accumulation of capital, thereby creating the foundation for socialist planning. The ultimate goal of social ownership of productive property for Marx was to expand the "realm of freedom" by shortening average work hours so that individuals would have progressively larger portions of their time to pursue their genuine and creative interests. Thus, the end goal of social ownership is the transcendence of the Marxist concept of alienation.

The economist David McMullen identifies five major benefits of social ownership, where he defines it as society-wide ownership of productive property: first, workers would be more productive and have greater motivation since they would directly benefit from increased productivity, secondly this ownership stake would enable greater accountability on the part of individuals and organizations, thirdly social ownership would eliminate unemployment, fourth it would enable the better flow of information within the economy, and finally it would eliminate wasteful activities associated with "wheeling and dealing" and wasteful government activities intended to curb such behavior and deal with unemployment.

From a non-Marxist, market-socialist perspective, the clearest benefit of social ownership is an equalization of the distribution of property income, eliminating the vast disparities in wealth that arise from private ownership under capitalism. Property income (profit, interest and rent) is distinguished from labor income (wages and salaries), which in a socialist system would continue to be unequal based on one's marginal product of labor—social ownership would only equalize passive property income.

Notable non-Marxist and Marxist socialist theorists alike have argued that the most significant argument for social ownership of the means of production is to enable productivity gains to ease the work burden for all individuals in society, resulting in progressively shorter hours of work with increasing automation and thus a greater amount of free time for individuals to engage in creative pursuits and leisure.

=== Criticism of private ownership ===
Social ownership is contrasted with the concept of private ownership and is promoted as a solution to what its proponents see as inherent issues of private ownership. Market socialists and non-market socialists therefore have slightly different conceptions of social ownership. The former believe that private ownership and private appropriation of property income is the fundamental issue with capitalism, and thus believe that the process of capital accumulation and profit-maximizing enterprise can be retained, with their profits being used to benefit society in the form of a social dividend. By contrast, non-market socialists argue that the major problems with capitalism arise from the contradictory economic laws that make it unsustainable and historically limited. Therefore, social ownership is seen as a component of the establishment of non-market coordination and alternative "socialist laws of motion" that overcome the systemic issues of capital accumulation.

The socialist critique of private ownership is heavily influenced by the Marxian analysis of capitalist property forms as part of its broader critique of alienation and exploitation in capitalism. Although there is considerable disagreement among socialists about the validity of certain aspects of Marxian analysis, the majority of socialists are sympathetic to Marx's views on exploitation and alienation. Socialists critique the private appropriation of property income on the grounds that, because such income does not correspond to a return on any productive activity and is generated by the working class, it represents exploitation. The property-owning (capitalist) class lives off passive property income produced by the working population through their claim to ownership in the form of stock, bonds, or private equity. This exploitative arrangement is perpetuated due to the structure of capitalist society. From this perspective, capitalism is regarded as a class system akin to historical class systems like slavery and feudalism.

Private ownership has also been criticized on ethical grounds by the economist James Yunker. Yunker argues that because passive property income requires no mental or physical exertion on the part of the recipient and because its appropriation by a small group of private owners is the source of the vast inequalities in contemporary capitalism, this establishes the ethical case for social ownership and socialist transformation.

== Socialization as a process ==
Socialization is broadly conceived as a process that transforms the economic processes and, by extension, the social relations within an economy, away from capitalist relations. Depending on the specific definition, it may include central planning, decentralized planning, cooperatives, syndicalism, communization, or other strategies of establishing social ownership. The Marxist understanding of socialization sees it as a restructuring of social relations to overcome alienation, replacing hierarchical social relations within the workplace with an association of members.

Some who disagree with state socialism consider it distinct from the process of "nationalization" which does not necessarily imply a transformation of the organizational structure of organizations or the transformation of the economic framework under which economic organizations operate. Emma Goldman wrote in 1935 in There Is No Communism in Russia from an anarchist perspective in favor of a definition strictly involving common ownership, critiquing Soviet-type economic planning:

The first requirement of Communism is the socialization of the land and of the machinery of production and distribution. Socialized land and machinery belong to the people, to be settled upon and used by individuals or groups according to their needs. In Russia land and machinery are not socialized but nationalized.

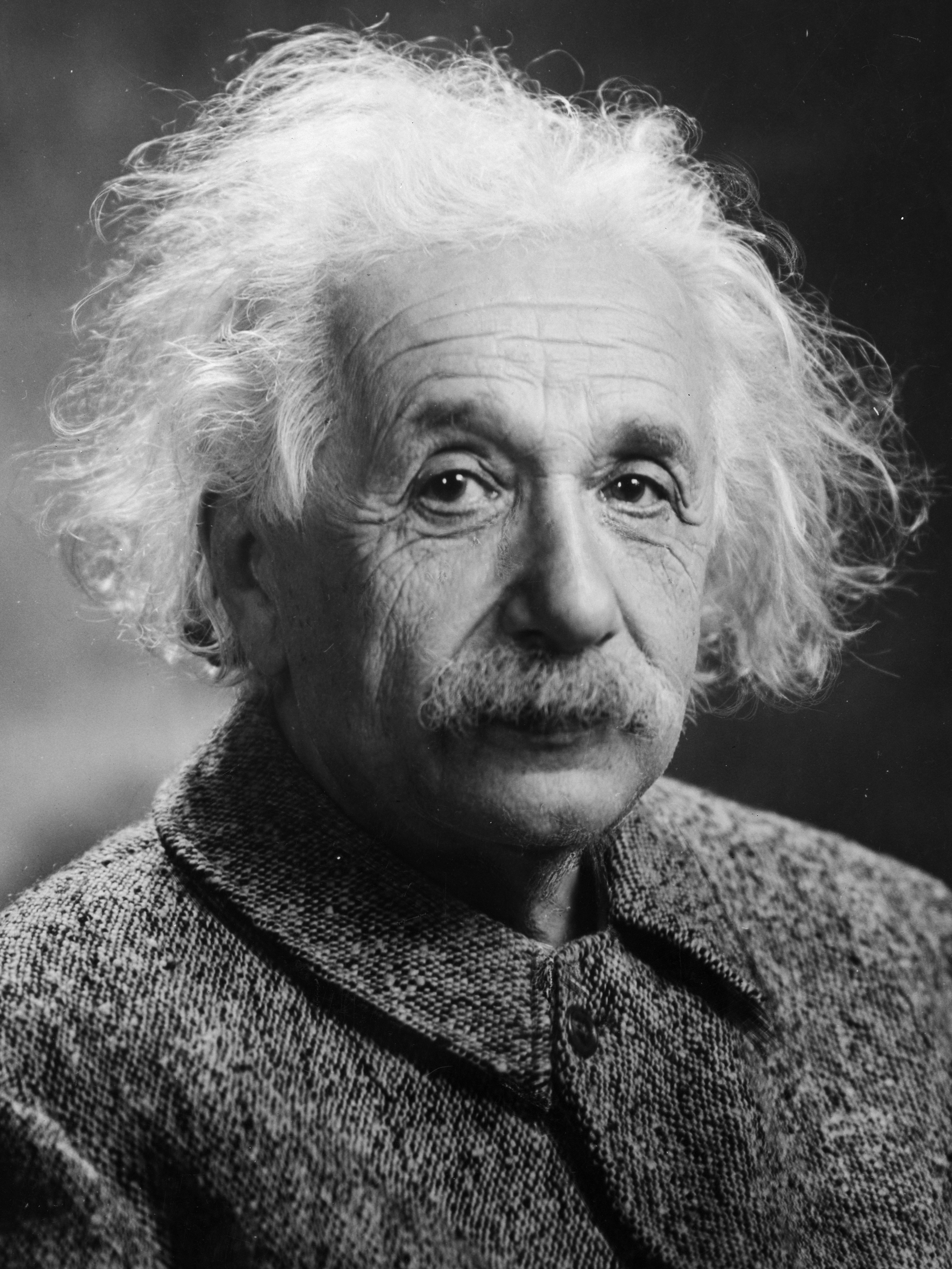
Albert Einstein advocated for a socialist planned economy with his 1949 article "Why Socialism?"

In the May 1949 issue of the Monthly Review titled "Why Socialism?", Albert Einstein wrote of a broad definition involving economic planning:

I am convinced there is only one way to eliminate [the] grave evils [of capitalism], namely through the establishment of a socialist economy, accompanied by an educational system which would be oriented toward social goals. In such an economy, the means of production are owned by society itself and are utilized in a planned fashion. A planned economy, which adjusts production to the needs of the community, would distribute the work to be done among all those able to work and would guarantee a livelihood to every man, woman, and child. The education of the individual, in addition to promoting his own innate abilities, would attempt to develop in him a sense of responsibility for his fellow-men in place of the glorification of power and success in our present society.

Others have proposed cooperatives as a specific solution of socialization in both command economies and market economies.

=== Socialization debates ===
During the 1920s, socialists in Austria and Germany were engaged in a comprehensive dialogue about the nature of socialization and how a program of socialization could be effectively carried out. Austrian scientific thinkers whose ideas were based on Ernst Mach's empiricist notion of energy and technological optimism, including Josef Popper-Lynkeus and Carl Ballod, proposed plans for rational allocation of exhaustible energy and materials through statistical empirical methods. This conception of non-capitalist calculation involved the use of energy and time units, the latter being viewed as the standard cardinal unity of measurement for socialist calculation. These thinkers belonged to a technical school of thought called "scientific utopianism", which is an approach to social engineering that explores possible forms of social organization.

The most notable thinker belonging to this school of thought was the Viennese philosopher and economist Otto Neurath, whose conception of socialism as a natural, non-monetary economic system became widespread within the socialist movement following the end of World War I. Neurath's position was held in contrast to other socialists in this period, including the revisionist perspective stemming from Eduard Bernstein, the orthodox social democratic perspective of Karl Kautsky, the Austro-Marxism models of labor-time calculation from Otto Bauer, and the emerging school of neoclassical market socialism. Neurath's position opposed all models of market socialism because it rejected the use of money, but was also held in contrast with the more orthodox Marxist conception of socialism held by Karl Kautsky, where socialism only entails the elimination of money as capital, along with the supersession of the process of capital accumulation.

Otto Neurath conceptualized a comprehensive view of socialization during the socialization debates. "Total socialization" involved not only a form of ownership but also the establishment of economic planning based on calculation in kind, and was contrasted with "partial socialization". "Partial socialization" involved the use of in-kind calculation and planning within a single organization, which externally operated within the framework of a monetary market economy. Neurath's conception of socialism was the initial point of criticism of Ludwig von Mises in the socialist calculation debate.

In the subsequent socialist calculation debates, a dichotomy between socialists emerged between those who argued that socialization entailed the end of monetary valuation and capital markets, and those who argued that monetary prices could be used within a socialized economy. A further distinction arose between market socialists, who argued that social ownership can be achieved within the context of a market economy, where worker-owned or publicly owned enterprises maximize profit, and those who argued that socially owned enterprises operate according to other criteria, such as marginal-cost pricing.

== Typology ==
In most cases, "socialization" is understood to be a deeper process of transforming the social relations of production within economic organizations as opposed to simply changing titles of ownership. In this sense, "socialization" often involves both a change in ownership and a change in organizational management, including self-management or some form of workplace democracy in place of a strict hierarchical form of control. More fundamentally, social ownership implies that the surplus product (or economic profits) generated by enterprises accrues to society more broadly than executives – state ownership neither necessarily implies nor rejects this.

There are a few major forms of "social ownership":

- Public ownership by an entity or network of entities representing society, which may be national, regional or local/municipal in scope.
- Cooperative ownership, with the members of each individual enterprise being co-owners of their organization.
- Common ownership, with open access for everyone in society, and where assets are indivisibly held in common.

Each of these forms have flaws or weaknesses that can be critiqued by anti-socialism advocates. Public ownership is said to give rise to a socialization dilemma faced by advocates of public ownership: if social ownership is entrusted exclusively to state agents, then it is liable to bureaucratization; if it is entrusted exclusively to workers, then it is liable to monopoly power and abuse of market position. Cooperative ownership is said to give rise to a socialization dilemma faced by advocates of cooperatives: if social ownership is entrusted to subgroups within society, resources may not be distributed according to broad social need. Cooperatives which operate within markets may particularly face this issue if they compete. It's been argued that common ownership can fall to the tragedy of the commons, or be difficult to broadly implement prior to upper-stage communism.

Additionally, there are two major forms of management or "social control" for socially owned organizations, both of which can exist alongside the two major modes of social ownership. The first variant of control is public management, where enterprises are run by management held accountable to an agency representing the public either at the level of national, regional or local government. The second form of social control is worker self-management, where managers are elected by the member-workers of each individual enterprise or enterprises are run according to self-directed work processes.

The exact forms of social ownership vary depending on whether or not they are conceptualized as part of a market economy or as part of a non-market planned economy.

=== Public ownership ===
Public ownership can exist both within the framework of a market economy and within the framework of a non-market planned economy.

In market socialist proposals, public ownership takes the form of state-owned enterprises that acquire capital goods in capital markets and operate to maximize profits, which are then distributed among the entire population in the form of a social dividend.

In non-market models of socialism, public ownership takes the form of a single entity or a network of public entities coordinated by economic planning. A contemporary approach to socialism involves linking together production and distribution units by modern computers to achieve rapid feedback in the allocation of capital inputs to achieve efficient economic planning.

The economist Alec Nove defines social ownership as a form of autonomous public ownership, drawing a distinction between state-owned and directed enterprises. Nove advocates for the existence of both forms of enterprise in his model of feasible socialism.

Public ownership was advocated by neoclassical socialist economists during the interwar socialist calculation debate, most notable Oskar Lange, Fred M. Taylor, Abba P. Lerner and Maurice Dobb. Neoclassical market socialist economists in the latter half of the 20th century who advocated public ownership highlighted the distinction between "control" and "ownership". John Roemer and Pranab Bardhan argued that public ownership, meaning a relatively egalitarian distribution of enterprise profits, does not require state control as publicly owned enterprises can be controlled by agents who do not represent the state.

David McMullen's concept of decentralized non-market socialism advocates social ownership of the means of production, believing it to be far more efficient than private ownership. In his proposal, property titles would be replaced by "usership" rights and the exchange of capital goods would no longer be possible. Market exchange in capital goods would be replaced by internal transfers of resources, but an internal and decentralized price system would be fundamental to this systems' operation.

However, by itself public ownership is not socialist as it can exist under a wide variety of different political and economic systems. State ownership by itself does not imply social ownership where income rights belong to society as a whole. As such, state ownership is only one possible expression of public ownership, which itself is one variation of the broader concept of social ownership.

=== Social ownership of equity ===
The social ownership of capital and corporate stock has been proposed in the context of a market socialist system, where social ownership is achieved either by having a public body or employee-owned pension funds that own corporate stock.

The American economist John Roemer developed a model of market socialism that features a form of public ownership where individuals receive a non-transferable coupon entitling them to a share of the profits generated by autonomous non-governmental publicly owned enterprises. In this model, "social ownership" refers to citizen ownership of equity in a market economy.

James Yunker argues that public ownership of the means of production can be achieved in the same way private ownership is achieved in modern capitalism, using the shareholder system that effectively separates management from ownership. Yunker posits that social ownership can be achieved by having a public body, designated the Bureau of Public Ownership (BPO), own the shares of publicly listed firms without affecting market-based allocation of capital inputs. Yunker termed this model Pragmatic market socialism and argued that it would be at least as efficient as modern-day capitalism while providing superior social outcomes as public ownership would enable profits to be distributed among the entire population rather than going largely to a class of inheriting rentiers.

An alternative form of social ownership of equity is ownership of corporate stock through wage earner funds and pension funds. The underlying concept was first expounded upon in 1976 by the management theorist Peter Drucker, who argued that pension funds could reconcile employees' need for financial security with capital's need to be mobile and diversified, referring to this development as "pension fund socialism".

In Sweden during the late 1970s, the Meidner program was advanced by the Swedish Social Democratic Party as a way to socialize enterprises through employee wage earners' funds, which would be used to purchase corporate stock. Rudolf Meidner's original plan was to require Swedish companies over a certain size to issue shares equal to 20 percent of profits, which would be owned by wage-earner funds controlled by employees through their trade unions. This plan was rejected and a watered-down proposal was adopted in 1984, which left corporate decision making just as it was and limited the scope of employee ownership to less than 3.5% of listed company shares in 1990.

In his 2020 United States Presidential campaign, Bernie Sanders proposed that 20% of stocks in corporations with over $100 million in annual revenue be owned by the corporation's workers.

=== Cooperative ownership ===
Cooperative ownership is the organization of economic units into enterprises owned by their workforce (workers cooperative) or by customers who use the products of the enterprise (this latter concept is called a consumer cooperative). Cooperatives are often organized around some form of self-management, either in the form of elected managers held accountable to the workforce, or in the form of direct management of work processes by the workers themselves. Cooperatives are often proposed by proponents of market socialism, most notably by the economists Branko Horvat, Jaroslav Vanek and Richard Wolff.

Cooperative ownership comes in various forms, ranging from direct workers' ownership, employee stock ownership plans through pension funds, to the weakest version involving profit sharing. Profit-sharing and varying degrees of self-management or "Holacracy" is practiced in many of the high-technology companies of Silicon Valley.

The earliest model of cooperative socialism is mutualism, proposed by the French anarchist philosopher Pierre-Joseph Proudhon. In this system, the state would be abolished and economic enterprises would be owned and operated as producer cooperatives, with worker-members compensated in labor vouchers.

The model of market socialism promoted in the former Socialist Federal Republic of Yugoslavia was based on what was officially called "social ownership", involving an arrangement where workers of each firm each became members and joint-owners and managed their own affairs in a system of workers' self-management.

Contemporary proponents of cooperative ownership cite higher motivation and performance in existing cooperatives. Critics argue that cooperative ownership by itself does not resolve the structural issues of capitalism like economic crises and the business cycle, and that cooperatives have an incentive to limit employment in order to boost the income of existing members.

=== Commons and peer-to-peer ===
In the context of non-market proposals, social ownership can include holding the means of producing wealth in common (common ownership), with the concept of "usership" replacing the concept of ownership. Commons-based peer production involves the distribution of a critical mass of inputs and all outputs through information networks as free goods rather than commodities to be sold for profit by capitalist firms.

The economist Pat Devine defines social ownership as "ownership by those who are affected by – who have an interest in – the use of the assets involved", distinguishing it from other forms of ownership. Devine argues that this variant of social ownership will be more efficient than the other types of ownership because "it enables the tacit knowledge of all those affected to be drawn upon in the process of negotiating what should be done to further the social interest in any particular context".

The phrases "social production" and "social peer-to-peer" production have been used to classify the type of workplace relationships and ownership structures found in the open-source software movement and Commons-based peer production processes, which operate, value and allocate value without private property and market exchange.

== Ownership in Soviet-type economies ==
In Soviet-type economies, the means of production and natural resources were almost entirely owned by the state and collective enterprises. State enterprises were integrated into a national planning system, where factor inputs were allocated to them by the Ministry for Technical Supply (Gossnab).

According to The Great Soviet Encyclopedia, "socialist ownership" is a form of social ownership that forms the basis for the socialist system, involving the collective appropriation of material wealth by working people. Social ownership arises out of the course of capitalist development, creating the objective conditions for further socialist transformation and for the emergence of a planned economy with the aim of raising the living standards for everyone in society.

== Misuse of the term ==
Particularly in the United States, the term socialization has been mistakenly used to refer to any state or government-operated industry or service (the proper term for such being either nationalization or municipalization). It has also been incorrectly used to mean any tax-funded programs, whether privately run or government run, like in socialized medicine.

Within fascist ideology, the term socialization of the economy refers to a theory proclaimed, and partly applied, in the Italian Social Republic of social transformation of the economy, in which ownership of the means of production is no longer exclusive to the capitalist, but shared with the workers employed in the company. The main legislative measure for its implementation was the Decree on the Socialization of Enterprises of February 1944, in addition to various regulatory references in the draft Constitution of the Italian Social Republic of December 1943.

== See also ==
- Co-determination – Aspect of corporate law
  - Worker representation on corporate boards of directors – Aspect of corporate law
- Cooperative – Autonomous association of persons or organizations
- Employee stock ownership – System giving employees stake in a company's ownership
- Market socialism – Economic system based on social ownership of the means of production in a market economy
- Proprietary Corporation – Fascist Corporatist economic project
- Worker cooperative – Cooperative that is owned and self-managed by its workers
