= Lange model =

Neoclassical economic model

The Lange model (or Lange–Lerner theorem) is a neoclassical economic model for a hypothetical socialist economy based on public ownership of the means of production and a trial-and-error approach to determining output targets and achieving economic equilibrium and Pareto efficiency. In this model, the state owns non-labor factors of production, and market simulations are used by the planning organs to allocate final goods and consumer goods. The Lange model states that if all production is performed by a public body such as a democratic state, and there is a functioning price mechanism, this economy will be Pareto-efficient, like a hypothetical market economy under perfect competition. Unlike models of capitalism, the Lange model is based on direct allocation, by directing enterprise managers to set price equal to marginal cost in order to achieve Pareto efficiency. By contrast, in a capitalist economy, private owners seek to maximize profits, while competitive pressures are relied on to indirectly lower the price; this discourages production with high marginal cost and encourages economies of scale.

This model was first proposed by Oskar R. Lange in 1936 during the socialist calculation debate, and was expanded by economists like H. D. Dickinson and Abba P. Lerner. Although Lange and Lerner called it "market socialism", the Lange model is a form of centrally planned economy where a central planning board allocates investment and capital goods, while markets allocate labor and consumer goods. The planning board simulates a market in capital goods by a trial-and-error process first elaborated by Vilfredo Pareto and Léon Walras. The Lange Model is in practice a type of centrally planned economy and not a type of market socialism.

The Lange model has never been implemented anywhere, not even in Oskar Lange's home country, Poland, where Soviet-type economic planning was imposed after World War II, precluding experimentation with Lange-style economy. Some parallels might be drawn with the New Economic Mechanism or so-called Goulash Communism in Hungary under Kádár, although this was not a pure Lange-model system.

== Overview ==
The model is sometimes called the "Lange–Lerner" model. Abba Lerner wrote a series of articles that greatly influenced Lange's thinking. For example, Lerner (1938) caused Lange to re-write his 1936 and 1937 articles on market socialism, before they were re-published as chapters in a 1938 book. Lerner (1938) influenced Lange's thinking on social dividend payments. Lerner (1944) also argued that investment in the Lange model would inevitably be politicized.

The Lange model was developed in response to Ludwig von Mises and Friedrich Hayek's criticisms of socialism during the socialist calculation debate. The critics argued that any body that owns and consolidates a society's means of production cannot acquire the information needed to calculate general equilibrium prices, and that market-determined prices were essential for the rational allocation of producer goods. The Lange model contains principles proposed by neoclassical economists Vilfredo Pareto and Léon Walras. Lange's theory emphasizes the idea of Pareto efficiency: a situation is Pareto-efficient if there is no way to rearrange things to make any individual better off without making anyone worse off. To achieve Pareto efficiency, a set of conditions must be formulated in stages. This idea of deriving conditions to ensure that consumer preferences are in balance with the maximum amount of goods and services produced is emphasized by Walras. The theorem indicates that a socialist economy based on public ownership could achieve one of the principal economic benefits of capitalism - a rational price system - and was an important theoretical force behind the development of the concept of market socialism.

== Basic principles ==
A chart to show how the model would hypothetically function.

The Lange model suggests three levels of decision-making. The lowest level contains firms and households, the intermediate level contains industrial ministries, and the highest level is the central planning board. The board sets the initial price of consumer goods arbitrarily and informs the producing firms of these prices. The state-owned firms then produce at the level of output where marginal cost equals price, P = MC, so as to minimize the cost of production. At the intermediate level, industrial ministries determine the sectoral expansion of industry. Households decide how to allocate income and how much labor to supply by choosing between work and leisure.

=== Institutions ===
The key institutions of the Lange model include the central planning board (CPB), industrial ministries for each economic sector, and state enterprises managed democratically by their employees.

=== Trial-and-error price adjustments ===
Because prices are set by the central planning board "artificially" aiming to achieve planned growth objectives, it is unlikely that supply and demand will be in equilibrium at first. To produce the correct amount of goods and services, the Lange model suggests a trial-and-error method. If there is a surplus of a particular good, the central planning board lowers the price of that good. Conversely, if there is a shortage of a good, the board raises the price. This process of price adjustments takes place until equilibrium between supply and demand is achieved.

=== Central planning board ===
The central planning board (CPB) has three major functions in the Lange model: First it instructs firms to set price to equal marginal cost, secondly it adjusts prices to attain market-clearing prices for goods and services, and finally, it reinvests the economic profit derived from state enterprises into the economy based on a target rate of growth. The central planning board also distributes social dividends to the population.

=== Social dividend ===
Apart from setting prices, the central planning board allocates social dividends. Because all non-labor factors of production are publicly owned, the rents and profits of these resources belong to the public. The profits would be used to finance a social dividend scheme based on the individuals' share in the income derived from the socially owned capital and natural resources, providing a complementary source of income for workers alongside their salaries and wages.

== Advantages ==
The Lange economic model has a number of theoretical advantages. One advantage is public control over investment. The rate of economic growth would be largely state-determined and a major determinant would be investment ratio.

Another advantage argued by Lange was that externalities could be better accounted for, thanks to the state's ability to manipulate resource prices. Because the state controls all firms, they could easily factor the cost of an externality into the price of a certain resource. Because decisions are made at higher rather than lower levels, it is argued that these decisions are less likely to have undesirable environmental consequences.

Furthermore, because the state uses marginal cost pricing and determines entry, Langean socialism can avoid monopolies and the accompanying lack of allocative efficiency and x-efficiency.

The model claims to solve another main criticism of capitalism. Lange believed that his model would reduce cyclical instability because the state would control savings and investment, consequently eliminating a major source of inefficiency, inequality and social instability that arises from violent cyclical shifts under capitalism.

== Criticisms ==
Milton Friedman criticized the Lange model on methodological grounds. According to Friedman, the model rested on "models of imaginary worlds" rather than "generalizations about the real world", making the claims of the model immune to falsification. He also criticized the model on ethical grounds, pointing out that governments would be quick to shut down or seize firms that do not align with targets mathematically proposed by the system, thus limiting true economic freedom. Other criticisms include how the Lange model assumes that market data is static and can be 'given' to central planners and that humans are passive and neutral in their preferences.

== See also ==
- Economic planning
- Market socialism
- Marginalism
- Socialist economics
- Fred M. Taylor
- Indicative planning

== Literature ==
- Gregory, Paul R.; Robert C. Stuart (2004). Comparing Economic Systems in the Twenty-First Century. Boston, MA: Houghton Mifflin Company. ISBN 0-618-26181-8.
- Kowalik, Tadeusz (1987). "Lange-Lerner mechanism," The New Palgrave: A Dictionary of Economics, v. 3, pp. 129–30.
- Roemer, John (1994). A Future for Socialism, Verso Press.
- Stiglitz, Joseph E. (1994). Whither Socialism?. Cambridge, MA: MIT Press. 0-262-19340-X.
- Lo, Dic; Russell Smyth (2004). "Towards a Re-interpretation of the Economics of Feasible Socialism". Cambridge Political Economy Society. 28 (6).
- Lange, O (1935). "Marxian Economics and Modern Theory". Review of Economic Studies. 2 (3): 189–201. doi:10.2307/2967586. JSTOR 2967586.
- Lange, O (1936). "On the Economic Theory of Socialism I". The Review of Economic Studies. 4 (1): 53–71. doi:10.2307/2967660. JSTOR 2967660.
- Lange, O 1937 On the Economic Theory of Socialism II The Review of Economic Studies V4 N 123-142
- Lange, O 1938 On the Economic Theory of Socialism B Lippincott ed. University of Minnesota Press
- Lange, O 1940 Letter to FA Hayek, translated by Thadeusz Kowalik
- Lange, O 1942 Economics of Socialism Journal of Political Economy 50(2):299-303
- Lange, O 1957a Political Economy of Socialism, reprinted in Kowalik 1994
- Lange, O 1957b. Role of Planning in a socialist economy, reprinted in Kowalik 1994
- Lange, O 1967 The Computer and the Market in Socialism, Capitalism, and Economic Growth Feinstein Ed. Reprinted in Economic Theory and Market Socialism T Kowalik ed. Edward Elgar pub.
- Lerner, A (1934). "Economic Theory and Socialist Economy". The Review of Economic Studies. 2 (1): 51–61. doi:10.2307/2967550. JSTOR 2967550.
- Lerner, A (1936). "A note on Socialist Economics". The Review of Economic Studies. 4 (1): 72–76. doi:10.2307/2967661. JSTOR 2967661.
- Lerner, A (1937). "Statics and Dynamics in Socialist Economics". The Economic Journal. 47 (186): 253–270. doi:10.2307/2225526. JSTOR 2225526.
- Lerner, A (1938). "Theory and Practice in Socialist Economics". The Review of Economic Studies. 6 (1): 71–5. doi:10.2307/2967541. JSTOR 2967541.
- Lerner, A 1944 The Economics of Control
- Lerner, A (1972). "The Economics and Politics of Consumer Sovereignty". The American Economic Review. 62 (1–2): 258–266.
- Lerner, A (1977). "Marginal Cost Pricing in the 1930s". The American Economic Review. 67 (1): 235–243.
- MacKenzie, DW, 2006 Oscar Lange and the Impossibility of Economic Calculation, Studia Economicze
- MacKenzie, DW Social Dividends, Entrepreneurial Discretion, and Bureaucratic Rules
- MacKenzie, DW Capital and Income in Democratic Socialism
- MacKenzie, DW Trial and Error in the Socialist Calculation Debate
- Roberts, Paul Craig (1971). "Oskar Lange's Theory of Socialist Planning". Journal of Political Economy. 79 (3): 562–77. doi:10.1086/259768. ISSN 1537-534X. JSTOR 1830772. S2CID 153391920.
- Rosefielde, Steven (1973). "Some Observations on the Concept of 'Socialism' in Contemporary Economic Theory". Soviet Studies. 25 (2): 229–43. doi:10.1080/09668137308410916. ISSN 0038-5859. JSTOR 150886.
- Shleifer, Andrei; Robert W. Vishny (1994). "The Politics of Market Socialism". The Journal of Economic Perspectives. 8 (2): 165–76. doi:10.1257/jep.8.2.165. S2CID 152437398.
