= Socialist calculation debate =

Discourse on the applicability of central planning without capital markets

The socialist calculation debate, sometimes known as the economic calculation debate, is a discourse on the subject of how a socialist economy would perform economic calculation given the absence of the law of value, money, financial prices for capital goods and private ownership of the means of production. More specifically, the debate is centered on the application of economic planning for the allocation of the means of production as a substitute for capital markets and whether or not such an arrangement would be superior to capitalism in terms of efficiency and productivity.

The historical debate was cast between the Austrian School represented by Ludwig von Mises and Friedrich Hayek, who argued against the feasibility of socialism; and between neoclassical and Marxian economists, most notably Cläre Tisch (as a forerunner), Oskar R. Lange, Abba P. Lerner, Fred M. Taylor, Henry Douglas Dickinson and Maurice Dobb, who took the position that socialism was both feasible and superior to capitalism. A central aspect of the debate concerned the role and scope of the law of value in a socialist economy. Although contributions to the question of economic coordination and calculation under socialism existed within the socialist movement prior to the 20th century, the phrase socialist calculation debate emerged in the 1920s beginning with Mises' critique of socialism.

While the debate is popularly viewed as a debate between proponents of capitalism and proponents of socialism, in reality a significant portion of the debate is between socialists who held differing views regarding the utilization of markets and money in a socialist system and to what degree the law of value would continue to operate in a hypothetical socialist economy. Socialists generally hold one of three major positions regarding the unit of calculation, including the view that money would continue to be the unit of calculation under socialism; that labor time would be a unit of calculation; or that socialism would be based on calculation in natura or calculation performed in-kind.

Debate among socialists has existed since the emergence of the broader socialist movement between those advocating market socialism, centrally planned economies and decentralized planning. Recent contributions to the debate in the late 20th century and early 21st century involve proposals for market socialism and the use of information technology and distributed networking as a basis for decentralized economic planning.

== Foundations and early contributions ==
Karl Marx and Friedrich Engels held a broad characterization of socialism, characterized by some form of public or common ownership of the means of production and workers' self-management within economic enterprises and where production of economic value for profit would be replaced by an ex ante production directly for use which implied some form of economic planning and planned growth in place of the dynamic of capital accumulation and therefore the substitution of commodity-based production and market-based allocation of the factors of production with conscious planning.

Although Marx and Engels never elaborated on the specific institutions that would exist in socialism or on processes for conducting planning in a socialist system, their broad characterizations laid the foundation for the general conception of socialism as an economic system devoid of the law of value and law of accumulation and principally where the category of value was replaced by calculation in terms of natural or physical units so that resource allocation, production and distribution would be considered technical affairs to be undertaken by engineers and technical specialists.

An alternative view of socialism prefiguring the neoclassical models of market socialism consisted of conceptions of market socialism based on classical economic theory and Ricardian socialism, where markets were utilized to allocate capital goods among worker-owned cooperatives in a free-market economy. The key characteristics of this system involved direct worker ownership of the means of production through producer and consumer cooperatives and the achievement of genuinely free markets by removing the distorting effects of private property, inequality arising from private appropriation of profits and interest to a rentier class, regulatory capture, and economic exploitation. This view was expounded by mutualism and was severely criticized by Marxists for failing to address the fundamental issues of capitalism involving instability arising from the operation of the law of value, crises caused by overaccumulation of capital and lack of conscious control over the surplus product. This perspective played little to no role during the socialist calculation debate in the early 20th century.

Early arguments against the utilization of central economic planning for a socialist economy were brought up by proponents of decentralized economic planning or market socialism, including Pierre-Joseph Proudhon, Peter Kropotkin and Leon Trotsky. In general, it was argued that centralized forms of economic planning that excluded participation by the workers involved in the industries would not be sufficient at capturing adequate amounts of information to coordinate an economy effectively while also undermining socialism and the concept of workers' self-management and democratic decision-making central to socialism. However, no detailed outlines for decentralized economic planning were proposed by these thinkers at this time. Socialist market abolitionists in favour of decentralized planning also argue that whilst advocates of capitalism and the Austrian School in particular recognize equilibrium prices do not exist, they nonetheless claim that these prices can be used as a rational basis when this is not the case, hence markets are not efficient. Other market abolitionist socialists such as Robin Cox of the Socialist Party of Great Britain argue that decentralized planning allows for a spontaneously self-regulating system of stock control (relying solely on calculation in kind) to come about and that in turn decisively overcomes the objections raised by the economic calculation argument that any large scale economy must necessarily resort to a system of market prices.

=== Early neoclassical contributions ===
In the early 20th century, Enrico Barone provided a comprehensive theoretical framework for a planned socialist economy. In his model, assuming perfect computation techniques, simultaneous equations relating inputs and outputs to ratios of equivalence would provide appropriate valuations in order to balance supply and demand.

== Proposed units for accounting and calculation ==
=== Calculation in kind ===
Calculation in kind, or calculation in-natura, was often assumed to be the standard form of accounting that would take place in a socialist system where the economy was mobilized in terms of physical or natural units instead of money and financial calculation.

Otto Neurath was adamant that a socialist economy must be moneyless because measures of money failed to capture adequate information regarding material well-being of consumers or failed to factor in all costs and benefits from performing a particular action. He argued that relying on any single unit, whether they be labor-hours or kilowatt-hours, would be inadequate and that demand and calculations be performed by the relevant disaggregated natural units, i.e. kilowatts, tons, meters and so on.

In the 1930s, Soviet mathematician Leonid Kantorovich demonstrated how an economy in purely physical terms could use determinate mathematical procedure to determine which combination of techniques could be used to achieve certain output or plan targets.

=== Debate on the use of money ===
In contrast to Neurath, Karl Kautsky argued that money would have to be utilized in a socialist economy. Kautsky states the fundamental difference between socialism and capitalism is not the absence of money in the former; rather, the important difference is in the ability for money to become capital under capitalism. In a socialist economy, there would be no incentive to use money as financial capital, therefore money would have a slightly different role in socialism.

=== Labor-time calculation ===
Jan Appel drafted a contribution to the socialist calculation debate which then went through a discussion process before being published as Foundations of Communist Production and Distribution by the General Workers' Union of Germany in 1930. An English translation by Mike Baker was published in 1990.

== Interwar debate ==
=== Economic calculation problem ===
Ludwig von Mises believed that private ownership of the means of production was essential for a functional economy, arguing:

Every step that takes us away from private ownership of the means of production and from the use of money also takes us away from rational economics.

— Ludwig von Mises, Economic Calculation in the Socialist Commonwealth

His argument against socialism was in response to Otto Neurath arguing for the feasibility of central planning. Mises argued that money and market-determined prices for the means of production were essential in order to make rational decisions regarding their allocation and use.

=== Criticism of the calculation problem ===
Bryan Caplan, a libertarian economist, has criticized the version of the calculation problem advanced by Mises arguing that the lack of economic calculation makes socialism impossible and not merely inefficient. Caplan argues that socialism makes economic calculation impossible, yet that problem may not be severe enough to make socialism impossible "beyond the realm of possibility". Caplan points out that the fall of the Soviet Union does not prove that calculation was the main issue there. He suggests that more likely the problems resulted from bad incentives arising out of the one-party political system and degree of power granted to the party elite.

=== Knowledge problem ===
Proponents of decentralized economic planning have also criticized central economic planning. Leon Trotsky believed that central planners, regardless of their intellectual capacity, operated without the input and participation of the millions of people who participate in the economy and so they would be unable to respond to local conditions quickly enough to effectively coordinate all economic activity. Trotsky argued:

If a universal mind existed, of the kind that projected itself into the scientific fancy of Laplace – a mind that could register simultaneously all the processes of nature and society, that could measure the dynamics of their motion, that could forecast the results of their inter-reactions – such a mind, of course, could a priori draw up a faultless and exhaustive economic plan, beginning with the number of acres of wheat down to the last button for a vest. The bureaucracy often imagines that just such a mind is at its disposal; that is why it so easily frees itself from the control of the market and of Soviet democracy. But, in reality, the bureaucracy errs frightfully in its estimate of its spiritual resources. [...] The innumerable living participants in the economy, state and private, collective and individual, must serve notice of their needs and of their relative strength not only through the statistical determinations of plan commissions but by the direct pressure of supply and demand.

— Leon Trotsky, The Soviet Economy in Danger

=== Lange model ===
Oskar Lange responded to Mises' assertion that socialism and social ownership of the means of production implied that rational calculation was impossible by outlining a model of socialism based on neoclassical economics. Lange conceded that calculations would have to be done in value terms rather than using purely natural or engineering criteria, but he asserted that these values could be attained without capital markets and private ownership of the means of production. In Lange's view, this model qualified as socialist because the means of production would be publicly owned with returns to the public enterprises accruing to society as a whole in a social dividend while workers' self-management could be introduced in the public enterprises.

This model came to be referred to as the Lange model. In this model, a Central Planning Board (CPB) would be responsible for setting prices through a trial-and-error approach to establish equilibrium prices, effectively running a Walrasian auction. Managers of the state-owned firms would be instructed to set prices to equal marginal cost (P=MC) so that economic equilibrium and Pareto efficiency would be achieved. The Lange model was expanded upon by Abba Lerner and became known as the Lange–Lerner theorem.

Paul Auerbach and Dimitris Sotiropoulos have criticized the Lange model for degrading the definition of socialism to a form of "capitalism without capital markets" attempting to replicate capitalism's efficiency achievements through economic planning. Auerbach and Sotiropoulos argue that Friedrich Hayek provided an analysis of the dynamics of capitalism that is more consistent with Marxian economics' analysis because Hayek viewed finance as a fundamental aspect of capitalism and any move through collective ownership or policy reform to undermine the role of capital markets would threaten the integrity of the capitalist system. According to Auerbach and Sotiropoulos, Hayek gave an unexpected endorsement to socialism that is more sophisticated than Lange's superficial defense of socialism.

== Contemporary contributions ==
=== Networked digital feedback ===
Peter Joseph argues for a transition from fragmented economic data relay to fully integrated, sensor-based digital systems, or an Internet of things. Using an internet of sensory instruments to measure, track and feed back information, this can unify numerous disparate elements and systems, greatly advancing awareness and efficiency potentials.

In an economic context, this approach could relay and connect data regarding how best to manage resources, production processes, distribution, consumption, recycling, waste disposal behavior, consumer demand and so on. Such a process of networked economic feedback would work on the same principle as modern systems of inventory and distribution found in major commercial warehouses. Many companies today use a range of sensors and sophisticated tracking means to understand rates of demands, exactly what they have, where it is or where it may be moving and when it is gone. It is ultimately an issue of detail and scalability to extend this kind of awareness to all sectors of the economy, macro and micro.

Not only is price no longer needed to gain critical economic feedback, but the information price communicates is long delayed and incomplete in terms of economic measures required to dramatically increase efficiency. Mechanisms related networked digital feedback systems make it possible to efficiently monitor shifting consumer preference, demand, supply and labor value, virtually in real time. Moreover, it can also be used to observe other technical processes price cannot, such as shifts in production protocols, allocation, recycling means, and so on. As of February 2018, it is now possible to track trillions of economic interactions related to the supply chain and consumer behavior by way of sensors and digital relay as seen with the advent of Amazon Go.

=== Cybernetic coordination ===
Paul Cockshott, Allin Cottrell, and Andy Pollack have proposed new forms of coordination based on modern information technology for non-market socialism. They argue that economic planning in terms of physical units without any reference to money or prices is computationally tractable given the high-performance computers available for particle physics and weather forecasting. Cybernetic planning would involve an a priori simulation of the equilibration process that idealized markets are intended to achieve.

=== Participatory economics ===
Proposals for decentralized economic planning emerged in the late 20th century in the form of participatory economics and negotiated coordination.

=== Decentralized pricing without markets ===
David McMullen argues that social ownership of the means of production and the absence of markets for them is fully compatible with a decentralized price system. In a post-capitalist society, transactions between enterprises would entail transfers of social property between custodians rather than an exchange of ownership. Individuals would be motivated by the satisfaction from work and the desire to contribute to good economic outcomes rather than material reward. Bids and offer prices would aim to minimize costs and ensure that output is guided by expected final demand for private and collective consumption. Enterprises and startups would receive their investment funding from project assessment agencies. The required change in human behavior would take a number of generations and would have to overcome considerable resistance. However, McMullen believes that economic and cultural development increasingly favors the transition.

=== Market socialism ===
James Yunker argues that public ownership of the means of production can be achieved the same way private ownership is achieved in modern capitalism through the shareholder system that separates management from ownership. Yunker posits that social ownership can be achieved by having a public body, designated the Bureau of Public Ownership (BPO), owning the shares of publicly listed firms without affecting market-based allocation of capital inputs. Yunker termed this model pragmatic market socialism and argued that it would be at least as efficient as modern-day capitalism while providing superior social outcomes as public ownership of large and established enterprises would enable profits to be distributed among the entire population rather than going largely to a class of inheriting rentiers.

=== Mechanism design ===
Beginning in the 1970s, new insights into the socialist calculation debate emerged from mechanism design theory. According to mechanism design theorists, the debate between Hayek and Lange became a stalemate that lasted for forty years because neither side was speaking the same language as the other, partially because the appropriate language for discussing socialist calculation had not yet been invented. According to these theorists, what was needed was a better understanding of the informational problems that prevent coordination between people. By fusing game theory with information economics, mechanism design provided the language and framework in which both socialists and advocates of capitalism could compare the merits of their arguments. As Palda (2013) writes in his summary of the contributions of mechanism design to the socialist calculation debate, "[i]t seemed that socialism and capitalism were good at different things. Socialism suffered from cheating, or 'moral hazard', more than capitalism because it did not allow company managers to own shares in their own companies. [...] The flip side of the cheating problem in socialism is the lying or 'adverse selection' problem in capitalism. If potential firm managers are either good or bad, but telling them apart is difficult, bad prospects will lie to become a part of the firm".

== Relation to neoclassical economics ==
In his book Whither Socialism?, Joseph Stiglitz criticized models of market socialism from the era of the socialist calculation debate in the 1930s as part of a more general criticism of neoclassical general equilibrium theory, proposing that market models be augmented with insights from information economics. Alec Nove and János Kornai held similar positions regarding economic equilibrium. Both Nove and Kornai argued that because perfect equilibrium does not exist, a comprehensive economic plan for production cannot be formulated, making planning ineffective just as real-world market economies do not conform to the hypothetical state of perfect competition. In his book The Economics of Feasible Socialism, Nove also outlined a solution involving a socialist economy consisting of a mixture of macro-economic planning with market-based coordination for enterprises where large industries would be publicly owned and small- to medium-sized concerns would be organized as cooperatively owned enterprises.

== See also ==
- Analysis of Soviet-type economic planning
- Cybernetics
- Government by algorithm
- Input-output model
- Linear programming
- Material balance planning
- Project Cybersyn
- Social peer-to-peer processes
- Socialism
- Socialist economics
- Resource-based economy
