= Market socialism =

Economic system based on social ownership of the means of production in a market economy

Market socialism is a type of economic system involving social ownership of the means of production within the framework of a market economy. Various models for such a system exist, usually involving cooperative enterprises and sometimes a mix that includes public or private enterprises. In contrast to the majority of historic self-described socialist economies, which have substituted some form of economic planning for the market mechanism, market socialists wish to retain the use of supply and demand signals to guide the allocation of capital goods and the means of production. Under such a system, depending on whether socially owned firms are state-owned or operated as worker cooperatives, profits may variously be used to directly remunerate employees, accrue to society at large as the source of public finance, or be distributed amongst the population in a social dividend.

Market socialism can be distinguished from the concept of the mixed economy because most models of market socialism propose complete and self-regulating systems, unlike the mixed economy. While social democracy aims to achieve greater economic stability and equality through policy measures such as taxes, subsidies, and social welfare programs, market socialism aims to achieve similar goals through changing patterns of enterprise ownership and management.

Though the term "market socialism" only emerged in the 1920s during the socialist calculation debate, a number of pre-Marx socialists, including the Ricardian socialist economists and mutualist philosophers, conceived of socialism as a natural development of the market principles of classical economics, and proposed the creation of co-operative enterprises to compete in a free-market economy. The aim of such proposals was to eliminate exploitation by allowing individuals to receive the full product of their labor, while removing the market-distorting effects of concentrating ownership and wealth in the hands of a small class of private property owners.

Although sometimes described as "market socialism", the Lange model is a form of market simulated planning where a central planning board allocates investment and capital goods by simulating factor market transactions, while markets allocate labor and consumer goods. The system was devised by socialist economists who believed that a socialist economy could neither function on the basis of calculation in natural units nor through solving a system of simultaneous equations for economic coordination.

Real-world attempts to create market socialist economies have only partially implemented the measures envisioned by its theorists, but the term has sometimes been used to describe the results of various attempts at liberalization in the Eastern Bloc including Hungary's New Economic Mechanism, the economy of Yugoslavia, Soviet perestroika, and the reform and opening up of China, as well as Lenin's New Economic Policy.

== Theoretical history ==
=== Classical economics ===
The key theoretical basis for market socialism is the negation of the underlying expropriation of surplus value present in other modes of production. Socialist theories that favored the market date back to the Ricardian socialists and anarchist economists, who advocated a free market combined with public ownership or mutual ownership of the means of production.

Proponents of early market socialism include the Ricardian socialist economists, the classical liberal philosopher John Stuart Mill and the anarchist philosopher Pierre-Joseph Proudhon. These models of socialism entailed perfecting or improving the market mechanism and free price system by removing distortions caused by exploitation, private property and alienated labor.

This form of market socialism has been termed free-market socialism because it does not involve planners.

==== John Stuart Mill ====
Mill's early economic philosophy was one of capitalistic free markets that he moved toward a more socialist bent, adding chapters to his Principles of Political Economy in defence of a socialist outlook, and defending some socialist causes. Within this revised work he also made the radical proposal that the whole wage system be abolished in favour of a co-operative wage system. Nonetheless, some of his views on the idea of flat taxation remained, albeit altered in the third edition of the Principles of Political Economy to reflect a concern for differentiating restrictions on unearned incomes which he favoured; and those on earned incomes, which he did not favour.

Mill's Principles, first published in 1848, was one of the most widely read of all books on economics in the period. As Adam Smith's Wealth of Nations had during an earlier period, Mill's Principles dominated economics teaching. In the case of Oxford University, it was the standard text until 1919, when it was replaced by Alfred Marshall's Principles of Economics.

In later editions of Principles of Political Economy, Mill would argue that "as far as economic theory was concerned, there is nothing in principle in economic theory that precludes an economic order based on socialist policies".

Mill also promoted substituting capitalist businesses with worker cooperatives, writing:

The form of association, however, which if mankind continue to improve, must be expected in the end to predominate, is not that which can exist between a capitalist as chief, and work-people without a voice in the management, but the association of the labourers themselves on terms of equality, collectively owning the capital with which they carry on their operations and working under managers elected and removable by themselves.

In his later thought, he advocated for a cooperative economic order, an economy based on enterprises run by workers themselves in an open market, rather than the employment-wage relationship of capitalist companies.

==== Mutualism ====
Pierre-Joseph Proudhon developed a theoretical system called mutualism which attacks the legitimacy of existing property rights, subsidies, corporations, banking and rent. Proudhon envisioned a decentralized market where people would enter the market with equal power, negating wage slavery. Proponents believe that cooperatives, credit unions and other forms of worker ownership would become viable without being subject to the state. Market socialism has also been used to describe some individualist anarchist works which argue that free markets help workers and weaken capitalists.

==== Individualist anarchism in the United States ====
For American anarchist historian Eunice Minette Schuster, "[i]t is apparent [...] that Proudhonian Anarchism was to be found in the United States at least as early as 1848 and that it was not conscious of its affinity to the Individualist Anarchism of Josiah Warren and Stephen Pearl Andrews. [...] William B. Greene presented this Proudhonian Mutualism in its purest and most systematic form". Josiah Warren is widely regarded as the first American anarchist, and the four-page weekly paper he edited during 1833, The Peaceful Revolutionist, was the first anarchist periodical published, an enterprise for which he built his own printing press, cast his own type, and made his own printing plates.

Warren was a follower of Robert Owen and joined Owen's community at New Harmony, Indiana. Josiah Warren termed the phrase "cost the limit of price", with "cost" here referring not to monetary price paid but the labor one exerted to produce an item. Therefore, "[h]e proposed a system to pay people with certificates indicating how many hours of work they did. They could exchange the notes at local time stores for goods that took the same amount of time to produce". He put his theories to the test by establishing an experimental "labor for labor store" called the Cincinnati Time Store where trade was facilitated by notes backed by a promise to perform labor. The store proved successful and operated for three years after which it was closed so that Warren could pursue establishing colonies based on mutualism. These included Utopia and Modern Times. Warren said that Stephen Pearl Andrews' The Science of Society, published in 1852, was the most lucid and complete exposition of Warren's own theories.

Later, Benjamin Tucker fused the economics of Warren and Proudhon and published these ideas in Liberty calling them "Anarchistic-Socialism". Tucker said: "[T]he fact that one class of men are dependent for their living upon the sale of their labour, while another class of men are relieved of the necessity of labour by being legally privileged to sell something that is not labour. [...] And to such a state of things I am as much opposed as anyone. But the minute you remove privilege [...] every man will be a labourer exchanging with fellow-labourers. [...] What Anarchistic-Socialism aims to abolish is usury [...] it wants to deprive capital of its reward". American individualist anarchists such as Tucker saw themselves as economic market socialists and political individualists while arguing that their "anarchistic socialism" or "individual anarchism" was "consistent Manchesterism". Modern market anarchism is based on a revival of such market socialist theories.

=== Neoclassical economics ===
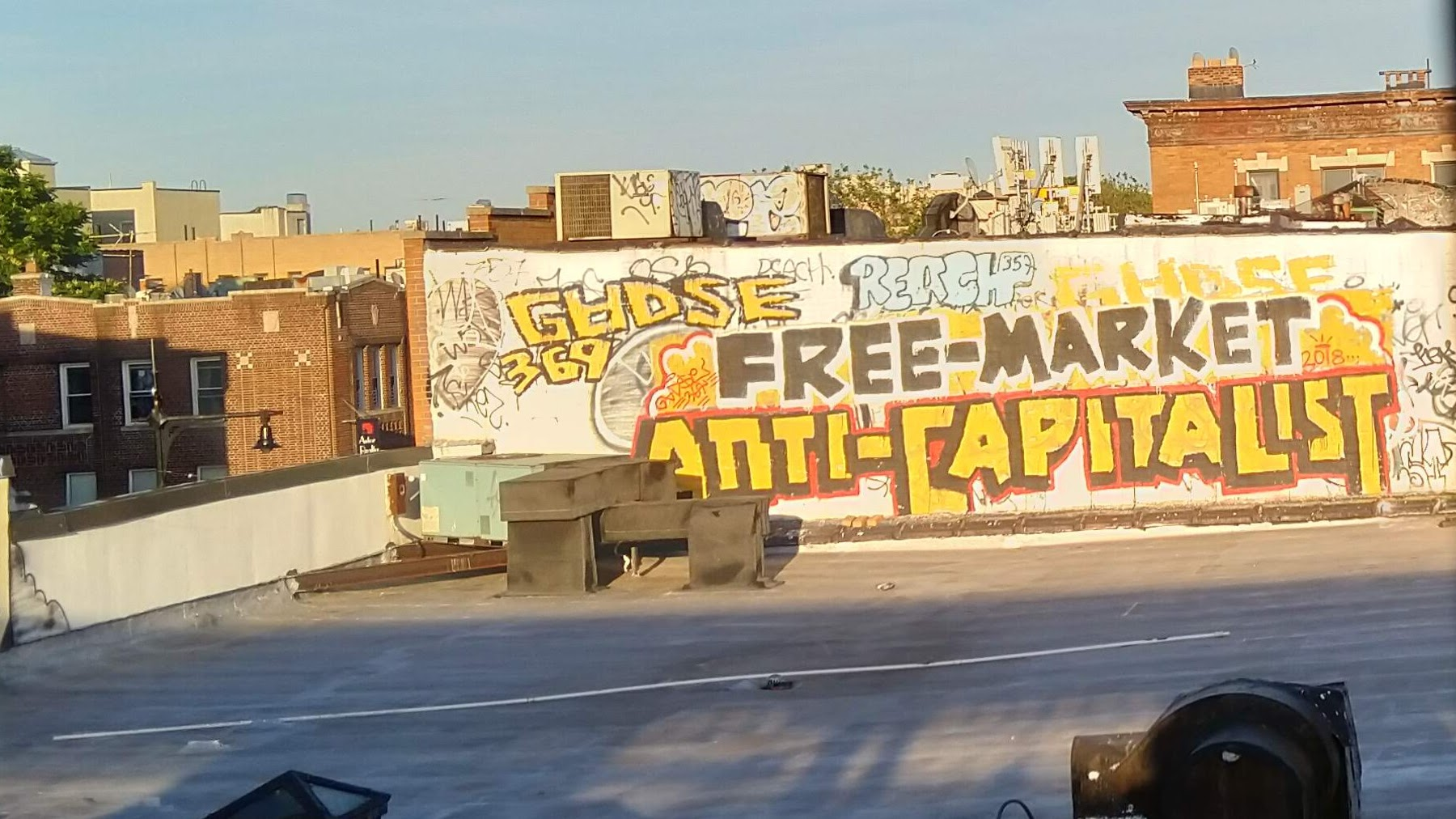
Libertarian socialist mural reading "Free market, anti-capitalist"

==== Early 20th century ====
Beginning in the early 20th century, neoclassical economic theory provided the theoretical basis for more comprehensive models of market socialism. Early neoclassical models of socialism included a role for a central planning board (CPB) in setting prices equal to marginal cost in order to achieve Pareto efficiency. Although these early models did not rely on conventional markets, they were labeled market socialist for their utilization of financial prices and calculation. Alternative outlines for market socialism involve models where socially owned enterprises or producer co-operatives operate within free markets under the criterion of profitability. In recent models proposed by American neoclassical economists, public ownership of the means of production is achieved through public ownership of equity and social control of investment.

The earliest models of neoclassical socialism were developed by Léon Walras, Enrico Barone (1908) and Oskar R. Lange (c. 1936). Lange and Fred M. Taylor (1929) proposed that central planning boards set prices through "trial and error", making adjustments as shortages and surpluses occurred rather than relying on a free price mechanism. If there were shortages, prices would be raised; if there were surpluses, prices would be lowered. Raising the prices would encourage businesses to increase production, driven by their desire to increase their profits, and in doing so eliminate the shortage. Lowering the prices would encourage businesses to curtail production to prevent losses, which would eliminate the surplus. Therefore, it would be a simulation of the market mechanism, which Lange thought would be capable of effectively managing supply and demand.

Although the Lange–Lerner model was often labelled as market socialism, it is better described as market simulation because factor markets did not exist for the allocation of capital goods. The objective of the Lange–Lerner model was explicitly to replace markets with a non-market system of resource allocation.

H. D. Dickinson published two articles proposing a form of market socialism, namely "Price Formation in a Socialist Community" (The Economic Journal 1933) and "The Problems of a Socialist Economy" (The Economic Journal 1934). Dickinson proposed a mathematical solution whereby the problems of a socialist economy could be solved by a central planning agency. The central agency would have the necessary statistics on the economy, as well as the capability of using statistics to direct production. The economy could be represented as a system of equations. Solution values for these equations could be used to price all goods at marginal cost and direct production. Hayek (1935) argued against the proposal to simulate markets with equations. Dickinson (1939) adopted the Lange-Taylor proposal to simulate markets through trial and error.

The Lange–Dickinson version of market socialism kept capital investment out of the market. Lange (1926 p65) insisted that a central planning board would have to set capital accumulation rates arbitrarily. Lange and Dickinson saw potential problems with bureaucratization in market socialism. According to Dickinson, "the attempt to check irresponsibility will tie up managers of socialist enterprises with so much red tape and bureaucratic regulation that they will lose all initiative and independence" (Dickinson 1938, p. 214). In The Economics of Control: Principles of Welfare Economics (1944), Abba Lerner admitted that capital investment would be politicized in market socialism.

==== Late 20th century and early 21st century ====
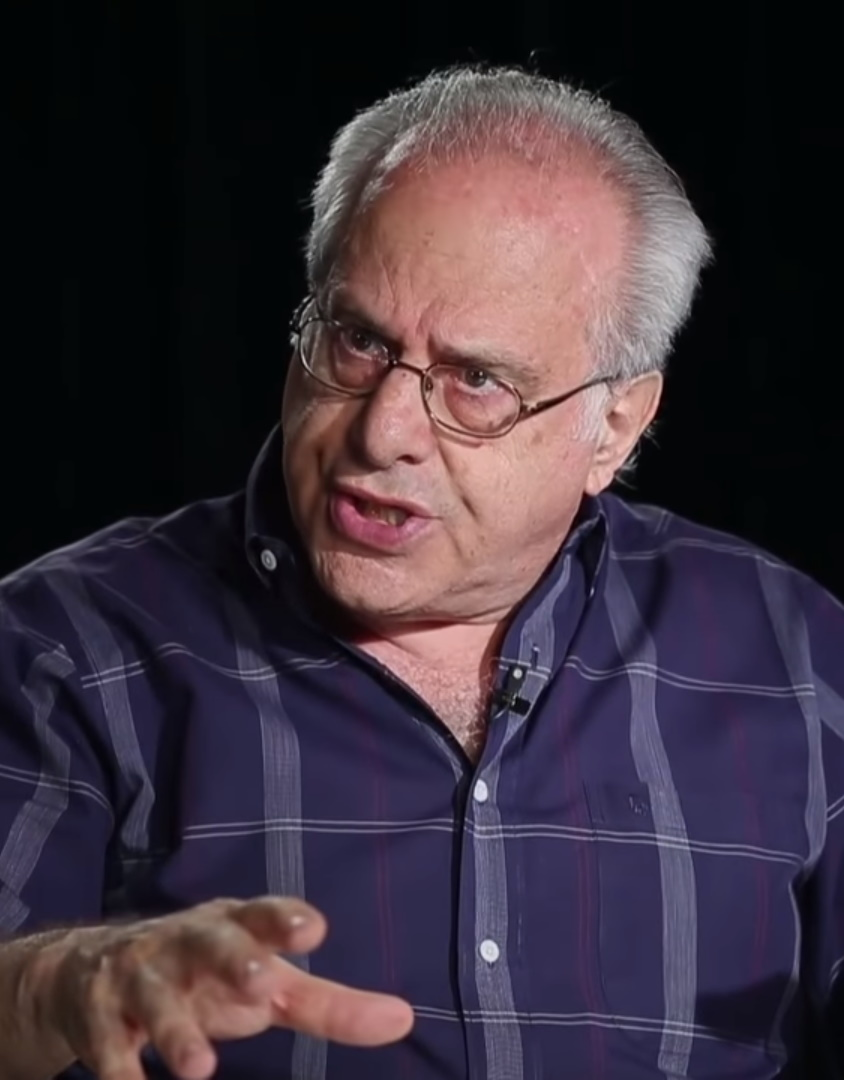
Richard D. Wolff is a Marxian economist who is a proponent of workers self-directed enterprises.

Economists active in the former Yugoslavia, including Czech-born Jaroslav Vaněk and Croat-born Branko Horvat, promoted a model of market socialism dubbed the Illyrian model, where firms were socially owned by their employees and structured around workers' self-management, competing with each other in open and free markets.

American economists in the latter half of the 20th century developed models based such as coupon socialism (by the analytical Marxism economist John Roemer) and economic democracy (by the philosopher David Schweickart).

Pranab Bardhan and John Roemer proposed a form of market socialism where there was a stock market that distributed shares of the capital stock equally among citizens. In this stock market, there is no buying or selling of stocks that leads to negative externalities associated with a concentration of capital ownership. The Bardhan and Roemer model satisfied the main requirements of both socialism (workers own all the factors of production, not just labour) and market economies (prices determine efficient allocation of resources). New Zealand economist Steven O'Donnell expanded on the Bardhan and Roemer model and decomposed the capital function in a general equilibrium system to take account of entrepreneurial activity in market socialist economies. O'Donnell (2003) set up a model that could be used as a blueprint for transition economies and the results suggested that although market socialist models were inherently unstable in the long term, they would provide in the short term the economic infrastructure necessary for a successful transition from planned to market economies.

In the early 21st century, the Marxian economist Richard D. Wolff refocused Marxian economics giving it a microfoundational focus. The core idea was that transition from capitalism to socialism required the reorganization of the enterprise from a top-down hierarchical capitalist model to a model where all key enterprise decisions (what, how, and where to produce and what to do with outputs) were made on a one-worker, one vote basis. Wolff called them workers self-directed enterprises (WSDEs). How they would interact with one another and with consumers was left open to democratic social decisions and could entail markets or planning, or likely mixtures of both.

Advocates of market socialism such as Jaroslav Vaněk argue that genuinely free markets are not possible under conditions of private ownership of productive property. Instead, he contends that the class differences and inequalities in income and power that result from private ownership enable the interests of the dominant class to skew the market to their favor, either in the form of monopoly and market power, or by utilizing their wealth and resources to legislate government policies that benefit their specific business interests. Additionally, Vaněk states that workers in a socialist economy based on cooperative and self-managed enterprises have stronger incentives to maximize productivity because they would receive a share of the profits (based on the overall performance of their enterprise) in addition to receiving their fixed wage or salary. The stronger incentives to maximize productivity that he conceives as possible in a socialist economy based on cooperative and self-managed enterprises might be accomplished in a free-market economy if employee-owned companies were the norm as envisioned by various thinkers including Louis O. Kelso and James S. Albus.

Giacomo Corneo, Professor of Public Finance and Social Policy at the Free University of Berlin, espouses an "updated version of market socialism" where large firms would be publicly owned (though by no more than 51% share), which would allow the government to distribute a social dividend, while the rest of the firms would be privately owned and subject to regulations to protect employees, consumers and environment.

Matt Bruenig advocates for a version of market socialism he calls "funds socialism", which involves sovereign wealth funds acquiring shares of private enterprises to socialize ownership and control of firms. Bruenig claims that this form of market socialism is similar to that advocated by Yanis Varoufakis, Rudolf Meidner, and John Roemer.

=== Anti-equilibrium economics ===
Another form of market socialism has been promoted by critics of central planning and generally of neoclassical general equilibrium theory. The most notable of these economists were Alec Nove and János Kornai. In particular, in 1983 Nove proposed what he called "feasible socialism", a mixed economy consisting of state-run enterprises, autonomous publicly owned firms, cooperatives and small-scale private enterprise operating in a market economy that included a role for macroeconomic planning.

== In practice ==
A number of market socialist elements have existed in various economies. The economy of Yugoslavia was widely considered to have been a form of market-based socialism, based on socially-owned cooperatives, workers' self-management, and market allocation of capital. Some of the economic reforms introduced during the Prague Spring by Alexander Dubček, the leader of Czechoslovakia, included elements of market socialism.

Likewise, Vietnam's socialist-oriented market economy is self-described as market socialist. It has an extremely high prevalence of cooperatives, especially in agriculture and retail, with the continued state ownership of the commanding heights of the economy. Cooperative businesses in Vietnam are also incentivized and supported by the government, receiving many benefits that private companies do not.

Peter Drucker described the United States system of regulated pension funds providing capital to financial markets as "pension fund socialism". William H. Simon characterized pension fund socialism as "a form of market socialism", concluding that it was promising but perhaps with prospects more limited than those envisioned by its enthusiasts.

The economy of Cuba under the rule of Raúl Castro has been described as attempting market socialist reforms. Similarly, the economy of Libya under Muammar Gaddafi could be described as a form of market socialism as Muammar Gaddafi's Third International Theory shared many similarities with Yugoslav self-management.

Policies similar to the market socialist proposal of a social dividend and basic income scheme have been implemented on the basis of public ownership of natural resources in Alaska (Alaska Permanent Fund) and in Norway (the Government Pension Fund of Norway).

After a decade of political, social and economic turmoil following the Cultural Revolution, China began its reform and opening-up in 1978 and formally amended its constitution in adopting the socialist market economy as the country's economic system in 1993.

== Relation to political ideologies ==
=== Marxism–Leninism ===
The phrase market socialism has occasionally been used in reference to any attempt by a Soviet-type planned economy to introduce market elements into its economic system. In this sense, market socialism was first attempted during the 1920s in the Soviet Union as the New Economic Policy (NEP) before being abandoned. Later, elements of market socialism were introduced in Hungary (nicknamed goulash communism), Czechoslovakia (sloganized as socialism with a human face), Yugoslavia (known as Titoism) in the 1970s and 1980s. The contemporary economy of Belarus has been described as a market socialist system. The Soviet Union attempted to introduce a market system with its perestroika reforms under Mikhail Gorbachev. During the later stages there was talk within top circles that the Soviet Union should move toward a market-based socialist system.

Historically, these kinds of market socialist systems attempt to retain state ownership of the commanding heights of the economy such as heavy industry, energy and infrastructure while introducing decentralised decision making and giving local managers more freedom to make decisions and respond to market demands. Market socialist systems also allow private ownership and entrepreneurship in the service and other secondary economic sectors. The market is allowed to determine prices for consumer goods and agricultural products, and farmers are allowed to sell all or some of their products on the open market and keep some or all of the profit as an incentive to increase and improve production.

Both the Eastern European and Chinese socialist approaches to market reforms assume that a "market economy" is not necessarily a capitalist market economy, and that a socialist economy is not necessarily a planned economy. This view draws support from Karl Marx's observations that markets existed under historical modes of production such as the Roman slave market economy and feudal markets.

However, a market socialist system in the context of Marxism–Leninism, while not a strict planned economy, in the sense of command economy, can still be characterized by a significant role of economic planning, as in the case of China with its five-year plans.

=== Socialism with Chinese characteristics ===
The term market socialism has been used to refer to reformed economic systems in Marxist–Leninist states, most notably in reference to the contemporary economy of the People's Republic of China, where a free price system is used for the allocation of capital goods in both the state and private sectors. However, Chinese political and economic proponents of the socialist market economy do not consider it to be a form of market socialism in the neoclassical sense and many Western economists and political scientists question the degree to which this model constitutes a form of market socialism, often preferring to describe it as state capitalism.

Although similar in name, market socialism differs markedly from the socialist market economy and socialist-oriented market economy models practiced in the contemporary People's Republic of China and Socialist Republic of Vietnam, respectively. Officially these economic systems represent market economies that are in the long-term process of transition toward socialism. Key differences between models of market socialism and the Chinese and Vietnamese models include the role of private investment in enterprises, the lack of a social dividend or basic income system to equitably distribute state profits among the population and the existence and role of financial markets in the Chinese model—markets which are absent in the market socialist literature.

The Chinese experience with socialism with Chinese characteristics is frequently referred to as a socialist market economy where the commanding heights are state-owned, but a substantial portion of both the state and private sectors of economy are governed by market practices, including a stock exchange for trading equity and the utilization of indirect macroeconomic market mechanisms (i.e. fiscal, monetary and industrial policies) to influence the economy in the same manner governments affect the economy in capitalist economies. The market is the arbitrator for most economic activity, with economic planning being relegated to macro-economic government indicative planning that does not encompass the microeconomic decision-making that is left to the individual organizations and state-owned enterprises. This model includes a significant amount of privately owned firms that operate as a business for profit, but only for consumer goods and services.

In the Chinese system, directive planning based on mandatory output requirements and quotas were displaced by market mechanisms for most of the economy, including both the state and private sectors, although the government engages in indicative planning for large state enterprises. In comparison with the Soviet-type planned economy, the Chinese socialist market model is based on the corporatization of state institutions, transforming them into joint-stock companies. As of 2008, there were 150 state-owned corporations directly under the central government. These state-owned corporations have been reformed and become increasingly dynamic and a major source of revenue for the state in 2008, leading the economic recovery in 2009 during the wake of the global financial crises.

This economic model is defended from a Marxist–Leninist perspective which states that a planned socialist economy can only emerge after first developing the basis for socialism through the establishment of a market economy and commodity-exchange economy; and that socialism would only emerge after this stage has exhausted its historical necessity and gradually transforms itself into socialism. Proponents of this model argue that the economic system of the former Soviet Union and its satellite states attempted to go from a natural economy to a planned economy by decree, without passing through the necessary market economy phase of development.

=== Social democracy and democratic socialism ===
Some social democrats and democratic socialists advocate forms of market socialism, some of which are based on self-management. Others advocate for a non-market participatory economy based on decentralized economic planning.

=== Anarchism ===
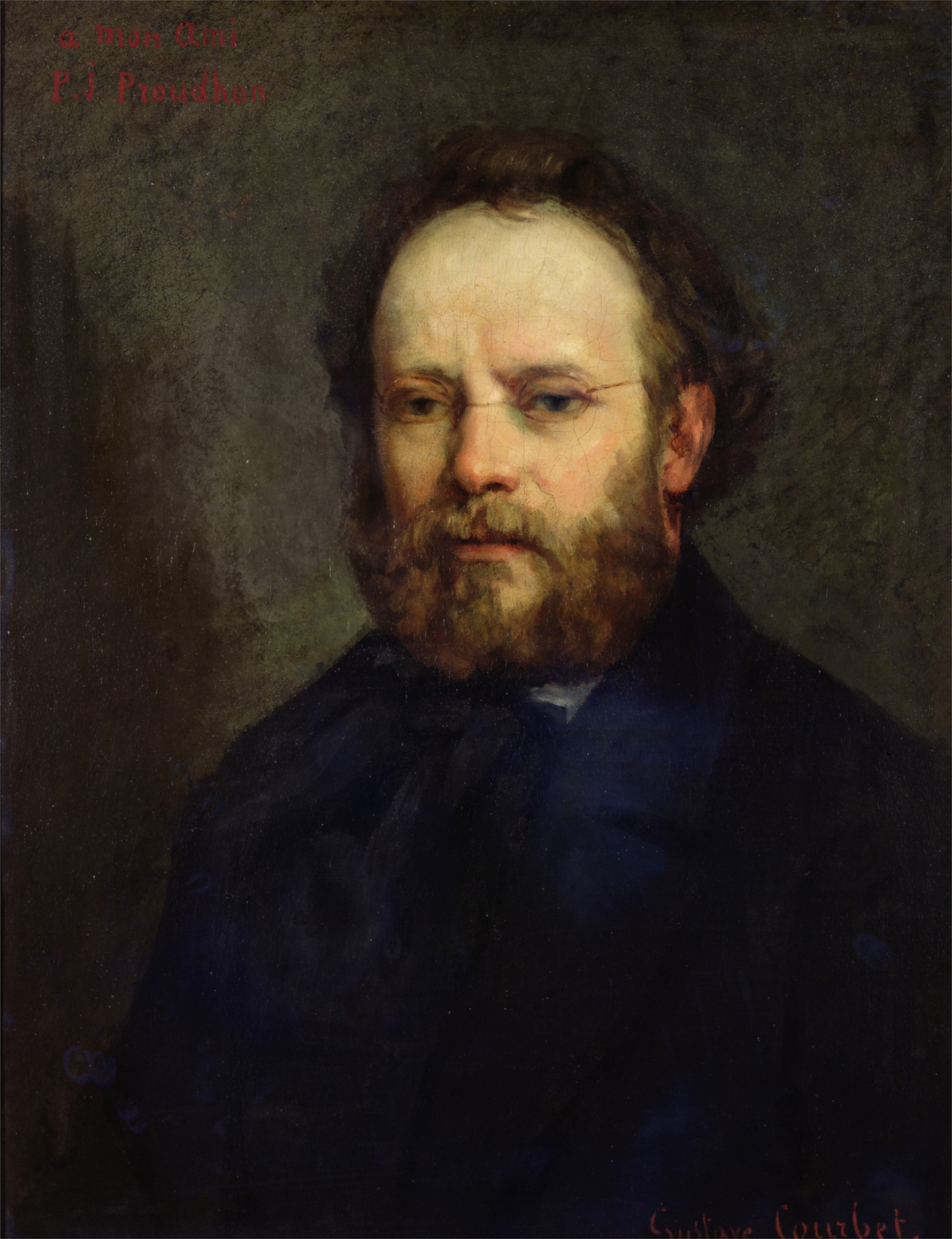
Pierre-Joseph Proudhon was the primary proponent of mutualism and influenced many later individualist anarchist and social anarchist thinkers.

The French philosopher Pierre-Joseph Proudhon is the first person to call himself an anarchist and considered among its most influential theorists. Proudhon is considered by many to be the "father of anarchism". Proudhon became a member of the French Parliament after the French Revolution of 1848, whereon he referred to himself as a federalist. Proudhon's best-known assertion is that "Property is theft!", contained in his first major work What Is Property?, published in 1840. The book's publication attracted the attention of the French authorities. It also attracted the scrutiny of Karl Marx, who started a correspondence with Proudhon. The two influenced each other and met in Paris while Marx was exiled there. Their friendship finally ended when Marx responded to Proudhon's The Philosophy of Poverty with the provocatively titled The Poverty of Philosophy. The dispute became one of the sources of the split between the anarchist and Marxist wings of the International Working Men's Association. Mutualism is an anarchist school of thought and market socialist economic theory that advocates a socialist society where each person possess a means of production, either individually or collectively, with trade representing equivalent amounts of labor in the free market. Integral to the scheme was the establishment of a mutual-credit bank that would lend to producers at a minimal interest rate, just high enough to cover administration. Mutualism is based on a labor theory of value which holds that when labor or its product is sold it ought to receive in exchange goods or services embodying "the amount of labor necessary to produce an article of exactly similar and equal utility".

Mutualism originated from the writings of Proudhon. Mutualists oppose the idea of individuals receiving an income through loans, investments and rent as they believe these individuals are not laboring. Although opposed to this type of income, Proudhon expressed that he had never intended "to forbid or suppress, by sovereign decree, ground rent and interest on capital. I think that all these manifestations of human activity should remain free and voluntary for all: I ask for them no modifications, restrictions or suppressions, other than those which result naturally and of necessity from the universalization of the principle of reciprocity which I propose". Insofar as they ensure the worker's right to the full product of their labor, mutualists support markets or artificial markets and property in the product of labor. However, mutualists argue for conditional titles to land, whose ownership is legitimate only so long as it remains in use or occupation (which Proudhon called possession), advocating personal property in place of private property. However, some individualist anarchists such as Benjamin Tucker started calling possession as property or private property.

Josiah Warren is widely regarded as the first American anarchist and the four-page weekly paper he edited during 1833, The Peaceful Revolutionist, was the first anarchist periodical published. For American anarchist historian Eunice Minette Schuster, "[i]t is apparent [...] that Proudhonian Anarchism was to be found in the United States at least as early as 1848 and that it was not conscious of its affinity to the Individualist Anarchism of Josiah Warren and Stephen Pearl Andrews. [...] William B. Greene presented this Proudhonian Mutualism in its purest and most systematic form". Later, the American individualist anarchist Benjamin Tucker "was against both the state and capitalism, against both oppression and exploitation. While not against the market and property he was firmly against capitalism as it was, in his eyes, a state-supported monopoly of social capital (tools, machinery, etc.) which allows owners to exploit their employees, i.e., to avoid paying workers the full value of their labour. He thought that the "labouring classes are deprived of their earnings by usury in its three forms, interest, rent and profit". Therefore, "Liberty will abolish interest; it will abolish profit; it will abolish monopolistic rent; it will abolish taxation; it will abolish the exploitation of labour; it will abolish all means whereby any labourer can be deprived of any of his product". This stance puts him squarely in the libertarian socialist tradition and, unsurprisingly, Tucker referred to himself many times as a socialist and considered his philosophy to be "[a]narchistic socialism".

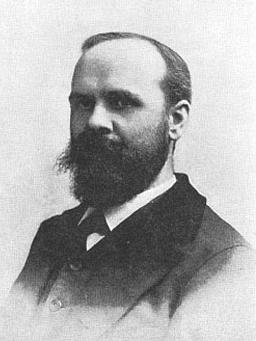
Benjamin Tucker, American individualist anarchist

French individualist anarchist Émile Armand shows clearly opposition to capitalism and centralized economies when he said that the individualist anarchist "inwardly he remains refractory – fatally refractory – morally, intellectually, economically (The capitalist economy and the directed economy, the speculators and the fabricators of single systems are equally repugnant to him.)". He argued for a pluralistic economic logic when he said that "Here and there everything happening – here everyone receiving what they need, there each one getting whatever is needed according to their own capacity. Here, gift and barter – one product for another; there, exchange – product for representative value. Here, the producer is the owner of the product, there, the product is put to the possession of the collectivity". The Spanish individualist anarchist Miguel Giménez Igualada thought that "capitalism is an effect of government; the disappearance of government means capitalism falls from its pedestal vertiginously. [...] That which we call capitalism is not something else but a product of the State, within which the only thing that is being pushed forward is profit, good or badly acquired. And so to fight against capitalism is a pointless task, since be it State capitalism or Enterprise capitalism, as long as Government exists, exploiting capital will exist. The fight, but of consciousness, is against the State". His view on class division and technocracy are as follows "Since when no one works for another, the profiteer from wealth disappears, just as government will disappear when no one pays attention to those who learned four things at universities and from that fact they pretend to govern men. Big industrial enterprises will be transformed by men in big associations in which everyone will work and enjoy the product of their work. And from those easy as well as beautiful problems anarchism deals with and he who puts them in practice and lives them are anarchists. [...] The priority which without rest an anarchist must make is that in which no one has to exploit anyone, no man to no man, since that non-exploitation will lead to the limitation of property to individual needs".

Market anarchism is a market socialist form of individualist anarchism, left-libertarianism and libertarian socialism associated with scholars such as Kevin Carson, Roderick T. Long, Charles W. Johnson, Brad Spangler, Samuel Edward Konkin III, Sheldon Richman, Chris Matthew Sciabarra and Gary Chartier, who stress the value of radically free markets, termed freed markets to distinguish them from the common conception which these libertarians believe to be riddled with capitalist and statist privileges. Referred to as left-wing market anarchists or market-oriented left-libertarians, proponents of this approach strongly affirm the classical liberal ideas of free markets and self-ownership while maintaining that taken to their logical conclusions these ideas support anti-capitalist, anti-corporatist, anti-hierarchical, pro-labor positions in economics; anti-imperialism in foreign policy; and thoroughly liberal or radical views regarding socio-cultural issues.

The genealogy of contemporary left-wing market anarchism, sometimes labelled market-oriented left-libertarianism, overlaps to a significant degree with that of Steiner–Vallentyne left-libertarianism as the roots of that tradition are sketched in the book The Origins of Left-Libertarianism. Carson–Long-style left-libertarianism is rooted in 19th-century mutualism and in the work of figures such as Thomas Hodgskin, French Liberal School thinkers such as Gustave de Molinari and the American individualist anarchists Benjamin Tucker and Lysander Spooner. While with notable exceptions market-oriented libertarians after Tucker tended to ally with the political right, relationships between those libertarians and the New Left thrived in the 1960s, laying the groundwork for modern left-wing market anarchism. Left-wing market anarchism identifies with left-libertarianism which names several related yet distinct approaches to politics, society, culture and political and social theory, which stress both individual freedom and social justice.

Unlike right-libertarians, left-libertarians believe that neither claiming nor mixing one's labor with natural resources is enough to generate full private property rights and maintain that natural resources (land, oil, gold and trees) ought to be held in some egalitarian manner, either unowned or owned collectively. Those left-libertarians who support property do so under different property norms and theories, or under the condition that recompense is offered to the local or global community.

== Criticism ==
Market abolitionists such as David McNally argue in the Marxist tradition that the logic of the market inherently produces inequitable outcomes and leads to unequal exchanges. According to him, Adam Smith's moral intent and moral philosophy espousing equal exchange was undermined by the practice of the free market he championed—the development of the market economy involved coercion, exploitation and violence that Smith's moral philosophy could not countenance. McNally criticizes market socialists for believing in the possibility of fair markets based on equal exchanges to be achieved by purging parasitical elements from the market economy such as private ownership of the means of production. He also argues that market socialism is an oxymoron when socialism is defined as an end to wage labour.

== See also ==
- Anti-capitalism – Political ideology and movement opposed to capitalism
- Crony capitalism – Capitalism featuring undue alliances between business interests and politicians
- Corporatism – Political ideology which advocates the organization of society by corporate groups
- Co-determination – Aspect of corporate law
  - Worker representation on corporate boards of directors – Aspect of corporate law
- Cooperative – Autonomous association of persons or organizations
  - Worker cooperative – Cooperative that is owned and self-managed by its workers
- Distributism – Economic theory promoting local control
- Dirigisme – Economic doctrine in which the state plays a strong directory role
- Market failure – Inefficiently allocated markets
- Monopoly – Market structure with a single firm dominating the market
- Neoclassical economics – Approach to economics
- Keynesian economics – Group of macroeconomic theories
- Planned economy – Type of economic system
- Public–private partnership – Partnership between a government and private company
- Socialist economics – Economic theories, practices and norms of socialism
- Employee stock ownership – System giving employees stake in a company's ownership
- Liberal socialism – Political philosophy incorporating liberal principles to socialism
- Mutualism – Anarchist school of thought and socialist economic theory
- New Economic Mechanism – Hungarian economic reforms from 1968
- Social market economy – Socio-economic model
- Social ownership – Ownership of the means of production by society
- Socialist-oriented market economy – Current economic system in Vietnam
- Titoism – Communist ideology
- Types of capitalism – Economic system based on private ownership
