= Giacomo Corneo =

Italian economist (born 1963)

- Born: November 22, 1963 (age 62); Arona, Italy

Giacomo Corneo (born November 22, 1963) is an Italian economist and professor. He holds the chair of public economics at the Free University of Berlin.

== Biography ==
Corneo earned a degree at Bocconi University, received a Diplôme d'études approfondies at the School for Advanced Studies in the Social Sciences, and completed two Ph.D. programs: one in political economy at the University of Pavia, and one from the European Doctoral Program in Quantitative Economics at the School for Advanced Studies in the Social Sciences. After a period of work at the Ministry of Finance in Paris, he got his habilitation at the University of Bonn in 1997. In early 1998 he became full professor of economics at the Faculty of Economics and Business Administration at Osnabrück University, where he also served as dean of the faculty. Since 2004, Corneo holds the chair of public economics at the Faculty of Economics and Business Administration at the Free University of Berlin.

Since 2004 he has been the managing editor of the Journal of Economics.

He is a research fellow at the Centre for Economic Policy Research, Center for Economic Studies, and the IZA Institute of Labor Economics

== Research ==
Corneo's major research fields are public economics, labor economics, comparative economics, industrial organization, and growth theory.

In 2010, Handelsblatt listed Corneo in their list of the 30 best economic researchers in the German-speaking area.

In collaboration with Guido Neidhöfer, Corneo studied how governmental redistribution affects migration patterns. For their work, they were awarded with the prize for the best scientific performance at the Zentrum für Europäische Wirtschaftsforschung in 2020/2021.

In recent work, Corneo analyzed how public ownership of capital through a "progressive sovereign wealth fund" and the distribution of a social dividend may be able to "achieve a more egalitarian distribution of income in advanced economies without suffering a loss of efficiency".

=== Selected articles ===
- Corneo, Giacomo (2022-03-01). "Progressive sovereign wealth funds". Journal of Government and Economics. 5 100033. doi:10.1016/j.jge.2022.100033.
- Corneo, Giacomo; Neidhöfer, Guido (2021-06-01). "Income redistribution and self-selection of immigrants". Journal of Public Economics. 198 104420. doi:10.1016/j.jpubeco.2021.104420.
- Corneo, Giacomo (2019). "Some institutional design for shareholder socialism". Review of Social Economy. 77 (1): 33–55. doi:10.1080/00346764.2018.1529332. JSTOR 48544217.
- Bönke, Timm; Corneo, Giacomo; Lüthen, Holger (January 2015). "Lifetime Earnings Inequality in Germany". Journal of Labor Economics. 33 (1): 171–208. doi:10.1086/677559. hdl:10419/55039.
- Bach, Stefan; Corneo, Giacomo; Steiner, Viktor (2009). "From Bottom to Top: The Entire Income Distribution in Germany, 1992–2003". Review of Income and Wealth. 55 (2): 303–330. doi:10.1111/j.1475-4991.2009.00317.x.
- Corneo, Giacomo; Grüner, Hans Peter (2002-01-01). "Individual preferences for political redistribution". Journal of Public Economics. 83 (1): 83–107. doi:10.1016/S0047-2727(00)00172-9.
- Corneo, Giacomo; Jeanne, Olivier (2001). "Status, the Distribution of Wealth, and Growth". The Scandinavian Journal of Economics. 103 (2): 283–293. doi:10.1111/1467-9442.00245. JSTOR 3440996.
- Corneo, Giacomo; Gruner, Hans Peter (December 2000). "Social Limits to Redistribution". American Economic Review. 90 (5): 1491–1507. doi:10.1257/aer.90.5.1491.
- Corneo, Giacomo; Jeanne, Olivier (1997-10-01). "Conspicuous consumption, snobbism and conformism". Journal of Public Economics. 66 (1): 55–71. doi:10.1016/S0047-2727(97)00016-9.

=== Books ===
- Corneo, Giacomo (2017-10-17). Is Capitalism Obsolete?: A Journey Through Alternative Economic Systems. Harvard University Press. ISBN 978-0-674-49528-9.
- Corneo, Giacomo (2018-03-15). Öffentliche Finanzen: Ausgabenpolitik (in German). Mohr Siebeck. ISBN 978-3-16-155932-7.
- Corneo, Giacomo G. (2006). New Deal für Deutschland: der dritte Weg zum Wachstum (in German). Campus Verlag. ISBN 978-3-593-37975-3.
