= Social dividend =

Financial return on society's capital assets

The social dividend is the return on the natural resources and capital assets owned by society in a socialist economy. The concept notably appears as a key characteristic of market socialism, where it takes the form of a dividend payment to each citizen derived from the property income generated by publicly owned enterprises, representing the individual's share of the capital and natural resources owned by society.

Although the social dividend concept has not yet been applied on a large scale, similar policies have been adopted on a limited basis. In both the former Soviet-type economies and non-socialist countries, the net earnings of revenue-generating state enterprises were considered a source of public revenue to be spent directly by the government to finance various public goods and services.

The concept of a social dividend overlaps with the concept of a universal basic income guarantee, but is distinguished from basic income in that a social dividend implies social ownership of productive assets whereas a basic income does not necessarily imply social ownership and can be financed through a much broader range of sources. Unlike a basic income, the social dividend yield varies based on the performance of the socially owned economy. The social dividend can be regarded as the socialist analogue to basic income. More recently the term universal basic dividend (UBD) has been used to contrast the social dividend concept with basic income.

== Overview ==
Social dividends are a key feature in many models of market socialism which are characterized by publicly owned enterprises operating to maximize profit within a market economy. In such a system, the social dividend would grant every citizen a share of the property income generated by publicly owned assets and natural resources, which would be received alongside any labor income (wages and salaries) earned through employment. In contrast to cooperative variants of market socialism, where the profits of each firm are distributed among the members/employees of each individual firm, a social dividend benefits the public at large. A social dividend would also eliminate the need for the social welfare and income redistribution programs, along with the administrative costs they incur, that exist in capitalist economies.

The benefits of a social dividend include broadly sharing the benefits of economic growth and technological progress, greater autonomy for individual citizens, greater social and income equality, and eliminating class differences in society arising from labor income and property income. The social dividend also has advantages over a basic income by addressing the criticism that a conventional basic income can be used as justification to weaken labor protection laws and unemployment compensation, creating a population dependent upon the subsistence levels of income afforded by the basic income, and might serve to further impede the transition to a post-capitalist society.

There are many institutional forms a social dividend can take. Generally, they are regarded as being universally distributed without constraint, even to unemployed individuals. However, the exact institutional arrangement varies among different proposals, for example, there might be certain constraints on the receipt of the dividend payment imposed on the unemployed.

Notable economists and political scientists who have articulated social dividend models in their models of socialism include Oskar Lange, Abba Lerner, James Meade, James Yunker, John Roemer, Pranab Bardhan, David Schweickart and Yanis Varoufakis.

== Theoretical history ==
=== Origins ===
As a precursor to the social dividend concept, Léon Walras, one of the founders of neoclassical economics who helped formulate the general equilibrium theory, argued that free competition could only be realized under conditions of state ownership of natural resources and land. Walras argued that nationalized land and natural resources would provide a source of income to the state that would eliminate the need for income taxes.

In Karl Marx's critique of political economy, property income is a component of surplus value, which refers to the net value above the total wage bill. The surplus value is distributed among a small minority of passive owners – capitalists and private shareholders. The capitalists appropriate the product of social labor by holding ownership titles to the means of production. While Marx was opposed to the distribution of property income under capitalism, the way property income is distributed was not the instrumentality of capitalist collapse nor was it the primary reason for the desirability of the abrogation of capitalism in Marx's view. In Marx's view capitalism was not to be opposed due to any supposedly moral defect in its distribution, but because its underlying dynamic of capital accumulation and surplus value appropriation was unstable and ultimately internally unsustainable. For Marx, socialism implied an end to this class dynamic, where the surplus product generated by the social means of production would be appropriated by all members of society.

The term "social dividend" was put forth by British economist George Douglas Howard Cole in his 1935 book In Principles of Economic Planning to refer to the distribution of the net social product in the form of a cash disbursement for a socialist economy. Prior to this, most socialist economists assumed the net social product would be remitted to the population in-kind. In Cole's model, income would be distributed on the basis of work performed and on the basis of citizenship, the latter representing the social dividend that recognized "...each citizen's claim as a consumer to share in the common heritage of productive power." The aim would be to make the dividend large enough, through greater economic growth and efficiency, to cover the basic needs of every citizen.

=== Proposed models ===
Oskar Lange is credited with the first use of the term “social dividend” in his seminal paper On the Economic Theory of Socialism, where he defined it as the accumulation of profit and rent minus investment by publicly owned enterprises. In Lange's model of socialism, the social dividend would be one component of the income to consumers alongside receipts for labor services. Abba P. Lerner contributed to the idea of a social dividend by incorporating it into Lange's original model of socialism as a lump-sum payment to each citizen as not to effect the efficient operation of labor markets. Lange's original proposal was to have the social dividend proportionate to a person's earnings from work. Abba Lerner's social dividend proposal was a modification of Lange's, where the social dividend would be distributed as a lump-sum payment and not be distributed proportionally to wages as to not disturb the efficient allocation of labor in the labor market. In Lerner's The Economics of Control: The Economics of Welfare the social dividend also serves as an economic lever for preventing inflation and deflation. The social dividend represented the citizen's share of the earnings of the factors of production other than labor, but in Lerner's model, it is distributed in a way that induces consumers to spend the right amount which along with investment demand for factors would provide full employment. Lerner's model proposed that inflation and depression could be prevented in a socialist economy by adjusting the level of the social dividend: if spending is too high, the social dividend could be set to zero or a negative (as a tax) to reduce demand.

British economist James Meade outlined a social dividend system within his model of what he called “liberal socialism”. Meade advocated for a reversal of the British nationalization process in the immediate post-Second World War period, where nationalized and state-owned British industries conferred control rights without conferring income rights to the state, with the state being denied free use of its profits. In an arrangement that Meade called “topsy-turvy nationalization” the state would act as a shareholder receiving residual income from its enterprises without being granted control rights over enterprises. The proceeds from the state-owned enterprises would finance the social dividend. The principle benefits of Meade's system was the separation of government micromanagement from enterprise management, flexible labor markets, and widely shared benefits of economic growth among the population.

For the American economist James Yunker, as a function of public ownership of the means of production the social dividend represents the most important and fundamental benefit of a socialist system. In Yunker's model of “pragmatic market socialism” enterprises would be organized as corporations and function almost identically to present-day capitalist firms, the major difference being that their shares would be owned by a public entity which he dubbed the “Bureau of Public Ownership”. The major difference between capitalism and this form of market socialism involves the distribution of property income: the property return generated by publicly owned corporations would belong to the population as a whole as opposed to accruing to a minority of private owners and shareholders, thereby eliminating the class distinction between owners and workers and inequality arising from the distinction between property income and labor income, while otherwise functioning almost identically to capitalism.

In John Roemer's and Pranab Bardhan's model of market socialism, public ownership takes the form of public ownership of shares in publicly listed firms. As firms are publicly owned, the dividend payments are divided equally among all adult citizens instead of accruing to a small class of private owners. The social dividend supplements individual income from wages and personal savings.

In Beyond the Profits System: Possibilities for the Post-Capitalist Era, economist Harry Shutt advocates a basic income system to replace all existing state social security and welfare functions with the exception of childcare. This measure would be financed by the public and cooperative ownership of enterprises, and is a measure to be adopted alongside the ending of capital accumulation as the driving force in the economy. Taken together, these measures would constitute a post-capitalist economy.

In February 2017, the Chinese think tank Shenzhen Innovation and Development Institute issued an Outline of Shared Development in Shenzhen which included a proposed a state-owned capital dividend fund. The goal of the proposed social dividend fund is to share the results of reform and development of Shenzhen's state-owned enterprises.

On 16 June 2017, the Organisation for Economic Co-operation and Development (OECD) published a study on the feasibility of a universal basic income in four OECD countries using the EUROMOD micro-simulation model. The study concluded that basic income would have mixed results and not be an efficient tool for reducing poverty, creating gainers and losers, with those currently receiving earnings-related or means-tested benefits suffering a decline in their living standards. The OECD report ends up recommending a social dividend as a partial alternative to basic income as a separate system from existing social protection, whose function would be to share the benefits of technological progress and globalization more equally.

== In practice ==
Social dividend systems have been implemented in limited form on the basis of public ownership of natural resources in the state of Alaska through the Alaska Permanent Fund and in Norway by the Government Pension Fund of Norway. The Alaska Permanent Fund distributes a share in the state's wealth derived from royalty income from oil produced on state-owned land and oil reserves to each individual in the form of a dividend payment on the basis of citizenship.

In the People's Republic of China regional social dividend-type systems are in place. The Macao Special Administrative Region has distributed cash disbursements to its residents since 2008 through the Wealth Partaking Scheme, with the goal of sharing the results of the region's development and enterprises with its population. Macao residents receive an annual state bonus financed mainly by lottery revenues. In the urban village of Huaidi in Shijiazhuang, Hebei, all citizens have been received an annual social dividend funded by collectively owned land development rights since 1995. Huaidi's property assets are also used to finance a range of in-kind benefits and public services.

The government of Singapore distributed a "growth dividend" to most of its citizens in 2011 financed out of ballooning government revenues from high rates of economic growth. However, unlike a social dividend, the "growth dividend" was a one-time disbursement and is not a regular disbursement.

== Criticism ==
In response to the socialist contention that passive shareholders and owners can be substituted for publicly owned institutional investors, Ludwig von Mises claimed that the private dividends of capitalists and speculators are necessary for calculating the opportunity costs of capital goods. According to Mises, attempts to replace private dividends with social dividends lead to either dis-coordinated bureaucratic planning or bureaucratic rigidity. Mises rejected Lange's proposal because financial markets provide signals that Langian market socialism lacks:

"Those suggesting a quasi market for the socialist system have never wanted to preserve the stock and commodity exchanges, the trading in futures, and the bankers and moneylenders as quasi-institutions. One cannot play speculation and investment. The speculators and investors expose their own wealth, their own destiny..."

MacKenzie asserts that John Roemer's proposed socialist "stock market" fails to provide a sufficient basis for efficient capital investment, and that equalization of stock ownership precludes an efficient division of labor between those who do and do not have a comparative advantage in planning capital projects.

== Related concepts ==
Social dividends have an alternate definition as the citizen's egalitarian share of surplus tax revenue. This form of social dividend exists within the framework of capitalism since productive assets would be privately owned, operated for private profits and would not directly finance the social dividend.

== See also ==
- Basic income
- Citizen's dividend
- Economic democracy
- Global resources dividend
- Lange model
- Public enterprise
- Profit (economics)
- Property income
- Social ownership
- Socialism
- Sovereign wealth fund
- Market socialism
- Negative income tax
- Universal inheritance
- Andrew Yang
