= Economic planning =

Resource allocation system based on a computational procedure

Economic planning is a resource allocation mechanism based on a computational procedure for solving a constrained maximization problem with an iterative process for obtaining its solution. Planning is a mechanism for the allocation of resources between and within organizations contrasted with the market mechanism. As an allocation mechanism for socialism, economic planning replaces factor markets with a procedure for direct allocations of resources within an interconnected group of socially owned organizations which together comprise the productive apparatus of the economy.

There are various forms of economic planning that vary based on their specific procedures and approach. The level of centralization or decentralization in decision-making depends on the specific type of planning mechanism employed. In addition, one can distinguish between centralized planning and decentralized planning. An economy primarily based on planning is referred to as a planned economy. In a centrally planned economy, the allocation of resources is determined by a comprehensive plan of production which specifies output requirements. Planning can also take the form of indicative planning within a market-based economy, where the state employs market instruments to induce independent firms to achieve development goals.

A distinction can be made between physical planning (as in pure socialism) and financial planning (as practiced by governments and private firms in capitalism). Physical planning involves economic planning and coordination conducted in terms of disaggregated physical units whereas financial planning involves plans formulated in terms of financial units.

== In socialism ==
Different forms of economic planning have been featured in various models of socialism. These range from decentralized-planning systems which are based on collective decision-making and disaggregated information to centralized systems of planning conducted by technical experts who use aggregated information to formulate plans of production. In a fully developed socialist economy, engineers and technical specialists, overseen or appointed in a democratic manner, would coordinate the economy in terms of physical units without any need or use for financial-based calculation. The economy of the Soviet Union never reached this stage of development, so planned its economy in financial terms throughout the duration of its existence. Nonetheless, a number of alternative metrics were developed for assessing the performance of non-financial economies in terms of physical output (i.e. net material product versus gross domestic product).

In general, the various models of socialist economic planning such as a socialist mode of production exist as theoretical constructs that have not been implemented fully by any economy, partially because they depend on vast changes on a global scale. In the context of mainstream economics and the field of comparative economic systems, socialist planning usually refers to the Soviet-style command economy, regardless of whether or not this economic system actually constituted a type of socialism or state capitalism or a third, non-socialist and non-capitalist type of system.

In some models of socialism, economic planning completely substitutes the market mechanism, supposedly rendering monetary relations and the price system obsolete. In other models, planning is utilized as a complement to markets.

=== Concept of socialist planning ===
The classical conception of socialist economic planning held by Marxists involved an economic system where goods and services were valued, demanded and produced directly for their use-value as opposed to being produced as a by-product of the pursuit of profit by business enterprises. This idea of production for use is a fundamental aspect of a socialist economy. This involves social control over the allocation of the surplus product and in its most extensive theoretical form calculation-in-kind in place of financial calculation. For Marxists in particular, planning entails control of the surplus product (profit) by the associated producers in a democratic manner. This differs from planning within the framework of capitalism which is based on the planned accumulation of capital in order to either stabilize the business cycle (when undertaken by governments) or to maximize profits (when undertaken by firms) as opposed to the socialist concept of planned production for use.

In such a socialist society based on economic planning, the primary function of the state apparatus changes from one of political rule over people (via the creation and enforcement of laws) into a technical administration of production, distribution and organization; that is, the state would become a coordinating economic entity rather than a mechanism of political and class-based control and thereby ceasing to be a state in the Marxist sense.

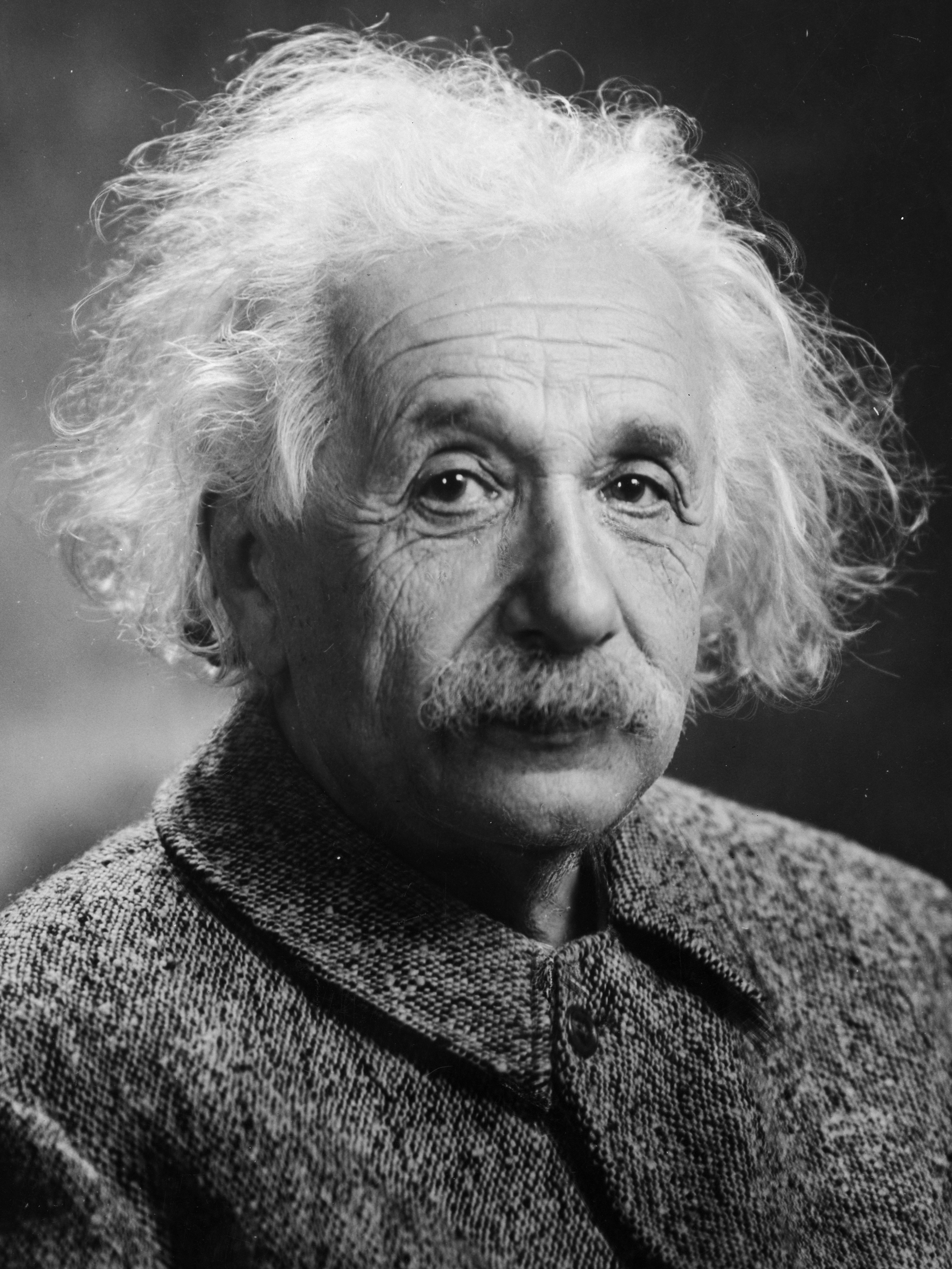
Albert Einstein advocated for a socialist planned economy with his 1949 article "Why Socialism?"

In the May 1949 issue of the Monthly Review titled "Why Socialism?", Albert Einstein wrote:

I am convinced there is only one way to eliminate (the) grave evils (of capitalism), namely through the establishment of a socialist economy, accompanied by an educational system which would be oriented toward social goals. In such an economy, the means of production are owned by society itself and are utilized in a planned fashion. A planned economy, which adjusts production to the needs of the community, would distribute the work to be done among all those able to work and would guarantee a livelihood to every man, woman, and child. The education of the individual, in addition to promoting his own innate abilities, would attempt to develop in him a sense of responsibility for his fellow-men in place of the glorification of power and success in our present society.

==== Administrative-command system ====
The concept of a command economy is differentiated from the concepts of a planned economy and economic planning, especially by socialists and Marxists who liken command economies (such as that of the former Soviet Union) to that of a single capitalist firm, organized in a top-down administrative fashion based on bureaucratic organization akin to that of a capitalist corporation.

Economic analysts have argued that the economy of the Soviet Union actually represented an administrative or command economy as opposed to a planned economy because planning did not play an operational role in the allocation of resources among productive units in the economy since in actuality the main allocation mechanism was a system of command-and-control. The term administrative-command economy gained currency as a more accurate descriptor of Soviet-type economies.

==== Decentralized planning ====
Decentralized economic planning is a planning process that starts at the user-level in a bottom-up flow of information. Decentralized planning often appears as a complement to the idea of socialist self-management, most notably by democratic socialists and libertarian socialists.

The theoretical postulates for models of decentralized socialist planning stem from the thought of Karl Kautsky, Rosa Luxemburg, Nikolai Bukharin and Oskar R. Lange. This model involves economic decision-making based on self-governance from the bottom-up (by employees and consumers) without any directing central authority. This often contrasts with the doctrine of orthodox Marxism–Leninism which advocates directive administrative planning where directives are passed down from higher authorities (planning agencies) to agents (enterprise managers), who in turn give orders to workers.

Two contemporary models of decentralized planning are participatory economics, developed by the economist Michael Albert; and negotiated coordination, developed by the economist Pat Devine.

==== Lange–Lerner–Taylor model ====
The economic models developed in the 1920s and 1930s by American economists Fred M. Taylor and Abba Lerner and by Polish economist Oskar R. Lange involved a form of planning based on marginal cost pricing. In Lange's model, a central planning board would set prices for producer goods through a trial-and-error method, adjusting until the price matched the marginal cost, with the aim of achieving Pareto-efficient outcomes. Although these models were often described as market socialism, they actually represented a form of market simulation planning.

==== Material balances ====
Material balance planning was the type of economic planning employed by Soviet-type economies. This system emerged in a haphazard manner during the collectivization drive under Joseph Stalin and emphasized rapid growth and industrialization. Eventually, this method became an established part of the Soviet conception of socialism in the post-war period and other socialist states emulated it in the latter half of the 20th century. Material balancing involves a planning agency taking a survey of available inputs and raw materials and using a balance-sheet to balance them with output targets specified by industry, thereby achieving a balance of supply and demand. In the case of the Soviet Union, this task fell on Gosplan and its subsidiaries: the industrial ministries and (under Khrushchev) the regional sovnarkhozy. The ministries in turn were subdivided into Chief Industrial Administrations (glavki), under which each enterprise was finally subordinated.

==== Input-Output Models ====
Input-Output models, developed by Wassily Leontief, take advantage of linear programming and matrices by dividing the economy into interdependent sectors that produce products for both themselves and other sectors; the production in one sector relies in the input of goods from another. The flow of goods strictly between sectors is modelled by a Leontief closed model where the resultant expression takes the form of $(I-A)X=0$ where $X$ as a variable may represent the optimal payment for each instance of production encoded in the matrix $A$. More sophisticated methods include open models where production satisfies exterior demand, and generally takes the form $X=(I-A)^{-1}D$, where $D$ is the demand matrix. This is a modelling method proposed by some socialist economists such as Paul Cockshott, who argue that the advent of modern computer technology since the times of Victor Glushkov negates the computational difficulty faced by 20th-century attempts at economic planning (See OGAS and Cybersyn).

== In capitalism ==
=== Intra-firm and intra-industry planning ===
Large corporations use planning to allocate resources internally among their divisions and subsidiaries. Many modern firms also use regression analysis to measure market demand to adjust prices and to decide upon the optimal quantities of output to be supplied. Planned obsolescence is often cited as a form of economic planning that is used by large firms to increase demand for future products by deliberately limiting the operational lifespan of its products, thus forcing customers to buy replacements. The internal structures of corporations have therefore been described as centralized command economies that use both planning and hierarchical organization and management.

According to J. Bradford DeLong, many transactions in Western economies do not pass through anything resembling a market, but rather they are actually movements of value among different branches and divisions within corporations, companies and agencies. Furthermore, much economic activity is centrally planned by managers within firms in the form of production planning and marketing management (that consumer demand is estimated, targeted and included in the firm's overall plan) and in the form of production planning.

In The New Industrial State, the American economist John Kenneth Galbraith noted that large firms manage both prices and consumer demand for their products by sophisticated statistical methods. Galbraith also pointed out that because of the increasingly complex nature of technology and the specialization of knowledge, management had become increasingly specialized and bureaucratized. The internal structures of corporations and companies had been transformed into what he called a "technostructure". Its specialized groups and committees are the primary decision-makers and specialized managers, directors and financial advisers operate under formal bureaucratic procedures, replacing the individual entrepreneur's role and intrapreneurship. Galbraith stated that both the obsolete notion of entrepreneurial capitalism and democratic socialism (defined as democratic management) are impossible organizational forms for managing a modern industrial system.

Joseph Schumpeter, an economist associated with both the Austrian School and the institutional school of economics, argued that the changing nature of economic activity (specifically the increasing bureaucratization and specialization required in production and management) was the major cause for capitalism eventually evolving into socialism. The role of the businessman was increasingly bureaucratic and specific functions within the firm required increasingly specialized knowledge which could be supplied as easily by state functionaries in publicly owned enterprises.

In the first volume of Das Kapital, Karl Marx identified the process of capital accumulation as central to the law of motion of capitalism. The increased industrial capacity caused by the increasing returns to scale further socializes production. Capitalism eventually socializes labor and production to a point that the traditional notions of private ownership and commodity production become increasingly insufficient for further expanding the productive capacities of society, necessitating the emergence of a socialist economy in which means of production are socially owned and the surplus value is controlled by the workforce. Many socialists viewed these tendencies, specifically the increasing trend toward economic planning in capitalist firms, as evidence of the increasing obsolescence of capitalism and inapplicability of ideals like perfect competition to the economy, with the next stage of evolution being the application of society-wide economic planning.

=== State development planning ===
State development planning or national planning entails macroeconomic policies and financial planning conducted by governments to stabilize the market or promote economic growth in market-based economies. This involves the use of monetary policy, industrial policy and fiscal policy to steer the market toward targeted outcomes. Industrial policy includes government taking measures "aimed at improving the competitiveness and capabilities of domestic firms and promoting structural transformation".

In contrast to socialist planning, state development planning does not replace the market mechanism and does not eliminate the use of money in production. It only applies to privately owned and publicly owned firms in the strategic sectors of the economy and seeks to coordinate their activities through indirect means and market-based incentives (such as tax breaks or subsidies).

== Around the world ==
While economic planning is mainly associated with socialism and the Soviet Union and the Eastern Bloc, in particular its administrative-command system, government planning of the economy can also happen under other political philosophies to industrialise and modernise the economy. A different form of planned economy operated in India during the Permit Raj era from 1947 to 1990. The unusually large government sector in countries like Saudi Arabia means that even though there is a market, central government planning controls allocation of most economic resources. In the United States, the government temporarily seized large portions of the economy during World War I and World War II, resulting in a largely government-planned war economy.

=== East Asia ===
The development models of the East Asian Tiger economies involved varying degrees of economic planning and state-directed investment in a model sometimes described as state development capitalism or the East Asian Model.

The economy in both Malaysia and South Korea were instituted by a series of macroeconomic government plans (First Malaysia Plan and Five-Year Plans of South Korea) that rapidly developed and industrialized their mixed economies.

The economy of Singapore was partially based on government economic planning that involved an active industrial policy and a mixture of state-owned industry and free-market economy.

=== France ===
Under dirigisme (dirigism), France used indicative planning and established a number of state-owned enterprises in strategic sectors of the economy. The concept behind indicative planning is the early identification of oversupply, bottlenecks and shortages so that state investment behavior can be quickly modified to reduce market disequilibrium so that stable economic development and growth can be sustained. France experienced its Trente Glorieuses (Thirty Glorious), years with economic prosperity.

=== Soviet Union ===
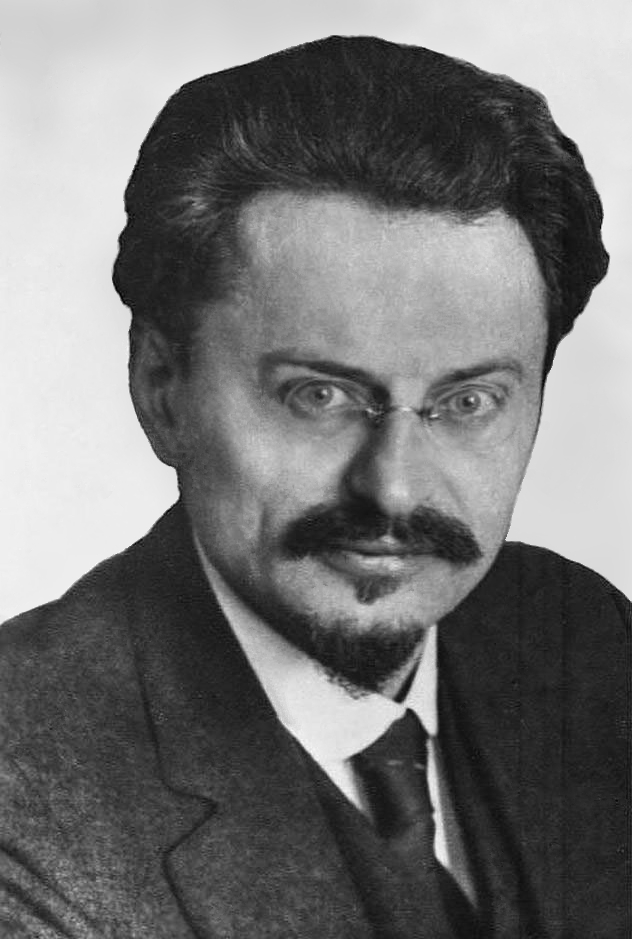
Leon Trotsky was among the earliest Soviet figures that supported economic planning and decentralization but opposed the Stalinist model.

The Soviet Union was the first national economy to attempt economic planning as a substitute for factor market allocation. Soviet-type economic planning took form in the 1930s and largely remained unchanged despite mild reforms until the Soviet Union's dissolution. Soviet economic planning was centralized and organized hierarchically, with a state planning agency such as the Gosplan establishing target rates for growth and the Gossnab allocating factor inputs to enterprises and economic units throughout the national economy. The national plan was broken down by various ministries, which in turn used the plan to formulate directives for local economic units which implemented them. The system used material balance planning. Economic information, including consumer demand and enterprise resource requirements, were aggregated to balance supply from the available resource inventories, with demand based on requirements for individual economic units and enterprises through a system of iterations.

Leon Trotsky was one of the earliest proponents of economic planning during the NEP period. He believed that planning and N.E.P should develop within a mixed framework until the socialist sector gradually superseded the private industry. Trotsky argued that specialisation, the concentration of production and the use of planning could “raise in the near future the coefficient of industrial growth not only two, but even three times higher than the pre-war rate of 6% and, perhaps, even higher”. According to historian Sheila Fitzpatrick, the scholarly consensus was that Stalin appropriated the position of the Left Opposition on such matters as industrialisation and collectivisation.

The economy of the Soviet Union operated in a centralized and hierarchical manner during the Stalinist era. The process used directives which were issued to lower-level organizations. Thus, the Soviet economic model was often referred to as a command economy or an administered economy as plan directives were enforced by inducements in a vertical power structure, with actual planning playing little functional role in the allocation of resources. Owing to difficulties in transmitting information in a timely fashion and disseminating information on demand throughout the whole economy, administrative mechanisms of decision-making and resource allocation played the dominant role in allocating factor inputs as opposed to planning.

Historian Robert Vincent Daniels regarded the Stalinist period to represent an abrupt break with Lenin's government in terms of economic planning in which a deliberated, scientific system of planning that featured former Menshevik economists at Gosplan had been replaced with a hasty version of planning with unrealistic targets, bureaucratic waste, bottlenecks and shortages. Stalin's formulations of national plans in terms of physical quantity of output was also attributed by Daniels as a source for the stagnant levels of efficiency and quality.

=== United Kingdom ===
The need for long-term economic planning to promote efficiency was a central component of Labour Party thinking until the 1970s. The Conservative Party largely agreed, producing the postwar consensus, namely the broad bipartisan agreement on major policies.

A long-term economic plan was a phrase often used in British politics.

=== United States ===
The United States used economic planning during World War I. The federal government supplemented the price system with centralized resource allocation and created a number of new agencies to direct important economic sectors, notably the Food Administration, Fuel Administration, Railroad Administration and War Industries Board. During World War II, the economy experienced staggering growth under a similar system of planning. In the postwar period, United States governments utilized such measures as the Economic Stabilization Program to directly intervene in the economy to control prices and wages, among other things, in different economic sectors.

Since the start of the Cold War, the federal government has directed a significant amount of investment and funding into research and development (R&D), often initially through the United States Department of Defense. The government performs 50% of all R&D in the United States, with a dynamic state-directed public-sector developing most of the technology that later becomes the basis of the private sector economy. Noam Chomsky has referred to the United States economic model as a form of state capitalism. Examples include laser technology, the internet, nanotechnology, telecommunications and computers, with most basic research and downstream commercialization financed by the public sector. That includes research in other fields including healthcare and energy, with 75% of most innovative drugs financed through the National Institutes of Health.

== Criticism ==
The most notable critique of central economic planning came from Austrian economists Friedrich Hayek and Ludwig von Mises. Hayek argued that central planners could not possibly accrue the necessary information to formulate an effective plan for production because they are not exposed to the rapid changes that take place in an economy in any particular time and place and so they are unfamiliar with those circumstances. The process of transmitting all the necessary information to planners is thus inefficient without a price system for the means of production. Modern theorists such as Cottrell and Cockshott, mentioned above, argue that modern advancements in mathematics and computational technology has made the “economic planning problem” obsolete. In his analysis of socialism in 1938, Oskar R. Lange addressed this theoretical issue by pointing out that planners could gain much of the information they required by monitoring changes in plant inventory levels. In practice, economic planners in Soviet-typed planned economies were able to make use of this technique.

Proponents of decentralized economic planning have also criticized central economic planning. Leon Trotsky believed that central planners, regardless of their intellectual capacity, operated without the input and participation of the millions of people who participate in the economy and so they would be unable to respond to local conditions quickly enough to effectively coordinate all economic activity. Trotsky further specified the need for Soviet democracy in relation to the industrialisation period to the Dewey Commission:

“The successes are very important, and I affirmed it every time. They are due to the abolition of private property and to the possibilities inherent in planned economy. But, they - I cannot say exactly - but I will say two or three times less than they could be under a regime of Soviet democracy”.

In his work, The Revolution Betrayed: What is the Soviet Union and Where is it Going?, Trotsky argued that the excessive authoritarianism under Stalin had undermined the implementation of the first five-year plan. He noted that several engineers and economists who had created the plan were themselves later put on trial as "conscious wreckers who had acted on the instructions of a foreign power".

== See also ==
- Calculation in kind
- Council democracy
- Cybernetics
- Decentralized planning (economics)
- Dirigisme
- Economic democracy
- Econometrics
- Enterprise resource planning
- Indicative planning
- Industrial policy
- Input–output planning
- Material Product System
- Material balance planning
- Mixed economy
- Nonmarket forces
- Participatory planning
- Peer-to-peer economy
- Planned economy
- Socialist calculation debate
- Socialization (economics)
- Socialist economics
- Soviet-type economic planning
- "The Use of Knowledge in Society"
- Why Socialism? – an article written by Albert Einstein which presented a critique of modern capitalism and advocated for a planned economy.
