= Fred M. Taylor =

American economist and educator

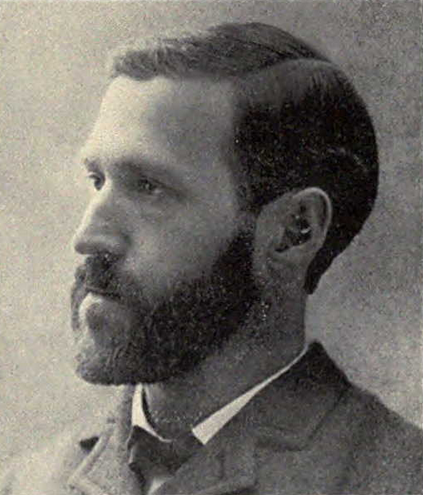
Taylor from the 1902 Michiganensian

Fred Manville Taylor (July 11, 1855, Northville, Michigan – August 7, 1932, Pasadena, California) was an American economist and educator best known for his contribution to the theory of market socialism. He taught mostly history at Albion College from 1879 to 1892. He taught in the department of economics at University of Michigan from 1892 to 1929 after receiving his Ph.D. in political philosophy there in 1888. His Principles of Economics (1911) went through 9 editions. Of a libertarian ideology, he was noted as a clear and rigorous expositor of economic theory in the partial-equilibrium lineage of Alfred Marshall.

In his American Economic Association presidential address, Taylor (1929) laid out the conditions under which a socialist economy could in theory achieve an efficient allocation of resources. The conditions parallel those of a private-enterprise economy. They include the state providing money income to its citizens, citizens using their income as they choose to buy output produced by state enterprises, and the state setting prices equal to marginal cost so as to compensate factors of production, including labor, with prices set by trial-and-error to clear markets. In this, Taylor stated principles of market socialism developed by Abba Lerner and Oscar Lange in the following decade and anticipated in mathematical form by Enrico Barone in 1908.

== Bibliography ==
- Fred Manville Taylor (1891). The Law of Nature.
- Fred Manville Taylor (1896). Do We Want an Elastic Currency?.
- Fred Manville Taylor (1907). Some Readings in Economics: Prepared for the Use of Students in Course I, Political Economy, University of Michigan. G. Wahr.
- Oskar Lange; Benjamin Evans Lippincott; Fred Manville Taylor (1964) [1938]. On the economic theory of socialism. McGraw-Hill. ISBN 9780070362598.
