= Sarkozysm =

Political terminology in France

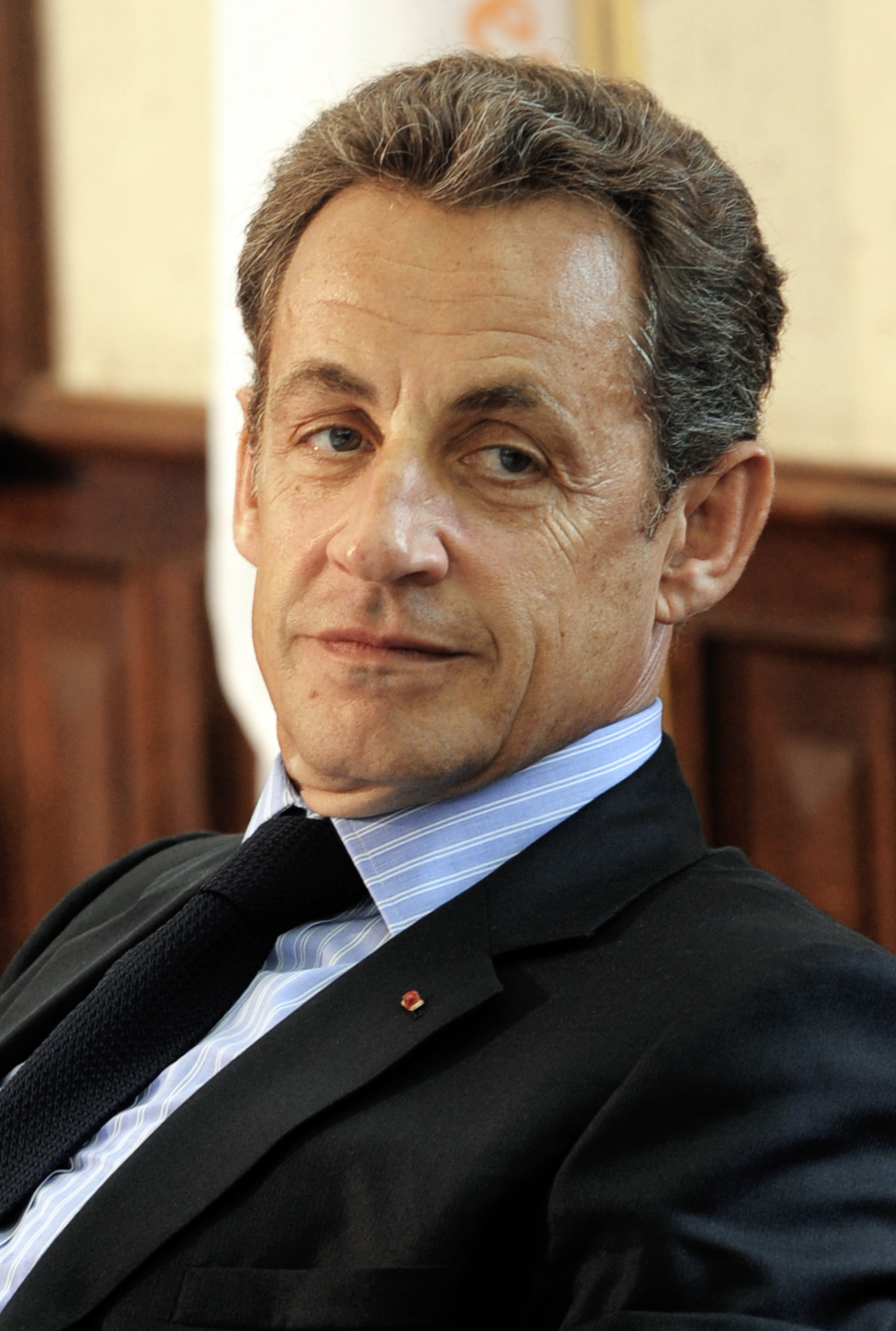
Nicolas Sarkozy

Sarkozysm (Sarkozysme) is the name commonly given to the policies and political agenda of former French President Nicolas Sarkozy, including his presidential policies between 2007 and 2012. It can also refer to the supporters of Nicolas Sarkozy within the centre-right Les Republicains (LR).

== Ideology ==
Nicolas Sarkozy's platform for the 2007 presidential election was the fruit of at least five years of work by over 250 intellectuals and experts under the auspices of Emmanuelle Mignon, who is sometimes referred to as the "brain" of Sarkozysm.

Although Sarkozy declared himself to be above existing theories and political ideologies, he nevertheless associated his ideology and political agenda with the Gaullist tradition of Charles de Gaulle and the former Rally for the Republic (RPR). However, Sarkozy envisioned his agenda as representing a clear break with the policies and orientations of his predecessor and political nemesis, President Jacques Chirac. Indeed, Sarkozysm sees itself as a rupture (break) with Chirac's leadership of the right and has denounced the alleged "immobilism" of Chirac's presidency.

Some observers like liberal economist Jacques Marseille or journalist Alain Duhamel have considered Sarkozysm to be a mix of modern Bonapartism and pragmatism.

According to Pierre Giacometti, the core values of Sarkozysm are: a certain work ethic (valeur travail), the nation-state and voluntarism with a dose of personality cult.

Former MEP Jean-Louis Bourlanges described Sarkozy's ideology as a mix of economic liberalism and Jacobinism, although this did not preclude Sarkozy, as President in November 2008, to bail out troubled banks or create a sovereign fund of 20 billion euros to finance the development of businesses who could not finance themselves through the traditional banking system.

French philosopher Pierre Musso, in his book Le Sarkoberlusconisme, claims that Sarkozysm is comparable to the policies of Silvio Berlusconi in Italy: a political 'break' with the methods of the past, a common emphasis on a certain work ethic, economic liberalism with a dose of dirigisme (or Colbertism), and a pro-American foreign policy.

A relatively unique specificity of Sarkozysm, in its earlier years, was a so-called policy of ouverture, whereby Sarkozy actively recruited certain supporters or members of the centre-left Socialist Party (PS) to his government. Left-wing personalities including Bernard Kouchner, Éric Besson, Fadela Amara, Frédéric Mitterrand, Jean-Marie Bockel, Jean-Pierre Jouyet or Martin Hirsch all served as ministers in Sarkozy's governments.

=== Style and form ===
Sarkozysm and Nicolas Sarkozy's presidency is also marked by a major change in political "style" and rhetoric.

Sarkozy was considered as a celebrity president during the first year of his term, and his opponents have often criticized his superficial attitudes and "bling bling" style. His close friendship with major businessmen and corporate CEOs (Arnaud Lagardère, Vincent Bolloré, Bernard Arnault) or prominent celebrities (Jean-Marie Bigard, Johnny Hallyday, Christian Clavier) have also been a source of unease with some.

Whereas former French Presidents tended to grant more autonomy and leeway to their Prime Ministers, Sarkozy's presidency was marked by a centralization of powers in the presidency and his style was branded by the press as "hyper-presidentialism".

== Heritage ==
Nicolas Sarkozy lost reelection to François Hollande on 6 May 2012, but within Sarkozy's party (the UMP), polls and the November 2012 UMP congress showed that activists and members of the UMP have remained strongly attached towards Nicolas Sarkozy and Sarkozysm. Both candidates for the presidency of the UMP in November 2012 – Sarkozy's Prime Minister François Fillon and UMP secretary-general Jean-François Copé have officially claimed loyalty to the Sarkozyst 'ideals'.

Since 2017, Nicolas Sarkozy has again become the most appreciated right-wing politician of the French.

During 2023, a resurgence in popularity, or even a significant shift, emerged towards the traditional so-called 'hard' right, especially since the legal cases against him and their consequences (prison in particular), where the justice system is considered by some French people to be militant of the 'moral' left (ideology of May '68) and which ultimately leads to a lack of objectivity in its decisions.

== Sarkozysm as a political faction ==
Sarkozysm and 'Sarkozysts' have also been used to denote Sarkozy's supporters and allies within the UMP, particularly during the period where he sought to take control the UMP (between 2002 and 2004) and until his election to the presidency in 2007.

Sarkozy's core group of supporters largely came from the balladurian liberal conservative faction of the former Rally for the Republic (RPR), a group of pro-European, fiscal conservatives and liberals who had supported Prime Minister Édouard Balladur's candidacy in the 1995 presidential election against that of RPR leader Jacques Chirac. Sarkozy, the budget minister in Balladur's government (1993–1995) and his campaign spokesperson, was one of the main leaders of the balladurian faction of the RPR and gradually took its leadership after 1997. Original members of this faction of the RPR included the liberal Patrick Devedjian (unsuccessful candidate for the presidency of the RPR in 1999), Dominique Perben, Michel Barnier, Michel Giraud, Patrick Balkany, Brice Hortefeux, Christian Estrosi, Bernard Accoyer and Thierry Mariani. François Fillon, a former ally of Philippe Séguin and longtime opponent Chirac's leadership of the RPR, became a Sarkozyst in around 2003–2004.

The distinctions between Sarkozysts and non-Sarkozysts within the UMP were blurred after Sarkozy's accession to the presidency of the UMP in 2004 and later to the French presidency in 2007. Several politicians previously identified as allies of Jacques Chirac, such as Jean-François Copé, reemerged as Sarkozysts during this period. Several younger politicians in the UMP, such as Nadine Morano and today Guillaume Peltier have identified themselves as loyal Sarkozysts.

Peltier's motion in the November 2012 UMP congress, The Strong Right won the most votes of any other motion with 27.77%.
