= Indicative planning =

Form of economic planning

Indicative planning is a form of economic planning implemented by a state in an effort to solve the problem of imperfect information in market economies by coordination of private and public investment through forecasts and output targets. The resulting plans aim to supply economically valuable information as a public good that the market by itself cannot disseminate, or where forward markets are nonexistent. However, indicative planning takes only endogenous market uncertainty into account, plans the economy accordingly, and does not look into exogenous uncertainty like technology, foreign trade, etc. Indicative plans serve to complement and enhance the market, as opposed to replace the market mechanism, hence they are adopted in market-based and mixed economies and were most widely practiced in France and Japan before the 1980s. When utilizing indicative planning, the state employs "influence, subsidies, grants, and taxes [to affect the economy], but does not compel". Indicative planning is contrasted with directive or mandatory planning, where a state (or other economic unit) sets quotas and mandatory output requirements. Planning by inducement is often referred to as indicative planning.

== In practice ==
Indicative planning is coordinated information that guides the choices of separate state and private entities in a market economy or mixed economy.

=== India ===
The Eighth Five Year Plan (1992 - 1997) adopted Indicative Planning in India. The Eighth Five Year Plan (1992 - 1997) managed the transition from a centrally planned economy to a market led economy through indicative planning.

=== France ===
Indicative planning originated in France after the Second World War by Charles de Gaulle in 1946 to strengthen the French economy and offset the demands of socialists and Communists calling for socialization of the means of production and/or Stalinist command planning. Indicative planning was one aspect of dirigisme that lasted until the 1980s. Indicative planning was carried out by the General Planning Commission. The underlying concept behind indicative planning is the early identification of oversupply, bottlenecks and shortages so that state investment behavior can be modified in a timely fashion to reduce the incidence of market disequilibrium, with the goal being a concerted economy. Policy tools used included export subsidies, R&D funding, tax breaks, preferential lending by state-owned banks, and a relaxed antitrust policy.

=== People's Republic of China ===
Since the 1978 economic reforms in China, the state reduced its role to directing economic activity rather than managing it through directive plans. By the early 21st century, the Chinese government had limited the role of directive mandatory planning to goods of national importance and large-scale construction, while increasing the scope of indicative planning and market forces in all other sectors of the economy. The current Chinese socialist market economy is largely based on market forces for consumer goods and indicative planning for heavy industry in the public sector.

=== Union of Soviet Socialist Republics ===
The Soviet Union utilized indicative plans for its state-run economy up until 1928, before they were integrated into mandatory planning under the Supreme Council of the National Economy and later by the Gosplan. Alexei Kosygin's 1965 Soviet economic reform tried to introduce some sort of indicative planning in the USSR.

=== Japan ===
The Japanese government practiced indicative planning through the Japanese Economic Planning Agency.

== National economic planning ==
The term National Economic Planning is associated with government's effort to coordinate the working of both the public sector and the private sector through a structured mechanism. Although, during the 20th century, the term was more associated with the communist and eastern economies, through the 1970s, theorists and practitioners documented the growth of this practice amongst western economies too . In the latter part of the 20th century and till date, economists have demanded that underdeveloped and developing countries — especially in continents like Africa — should embrace National Economic Planning to a large extent . Famous proponents and practitioners of National Economic Planning have been Nobel Prize–winning Russian politician Leonid Kantorovich, John M Hartwick , Carl Landauer (who, in 1947, wrote one of the first western books on the subject, titled Theory of National Economic Planning), American Republican politician Alf Landon, the Russian born Canadian politician David Lewis, Chinese politician Zhang Baoshun and German sociologist Adolph Lowe.

== See also ==
- Reform and opening up
- Market economy
- Mixed economy
- Dirigisme
- Socialist economics
- State capitalism
- State-sponsored capitalism
- Economic planning
- New Economic Policy

== Literature ==
- Carl Landauer: Planwirtschaft und Verkehrswirtschaft Duncker & Humblodt, München und Leipzig 1931.
- Carl Landauer: Theory of national economic planning, Berkeley, California: University of California Press, 1944 first edition; 1947 2. edition.
