= Market economy =

Type of economic system

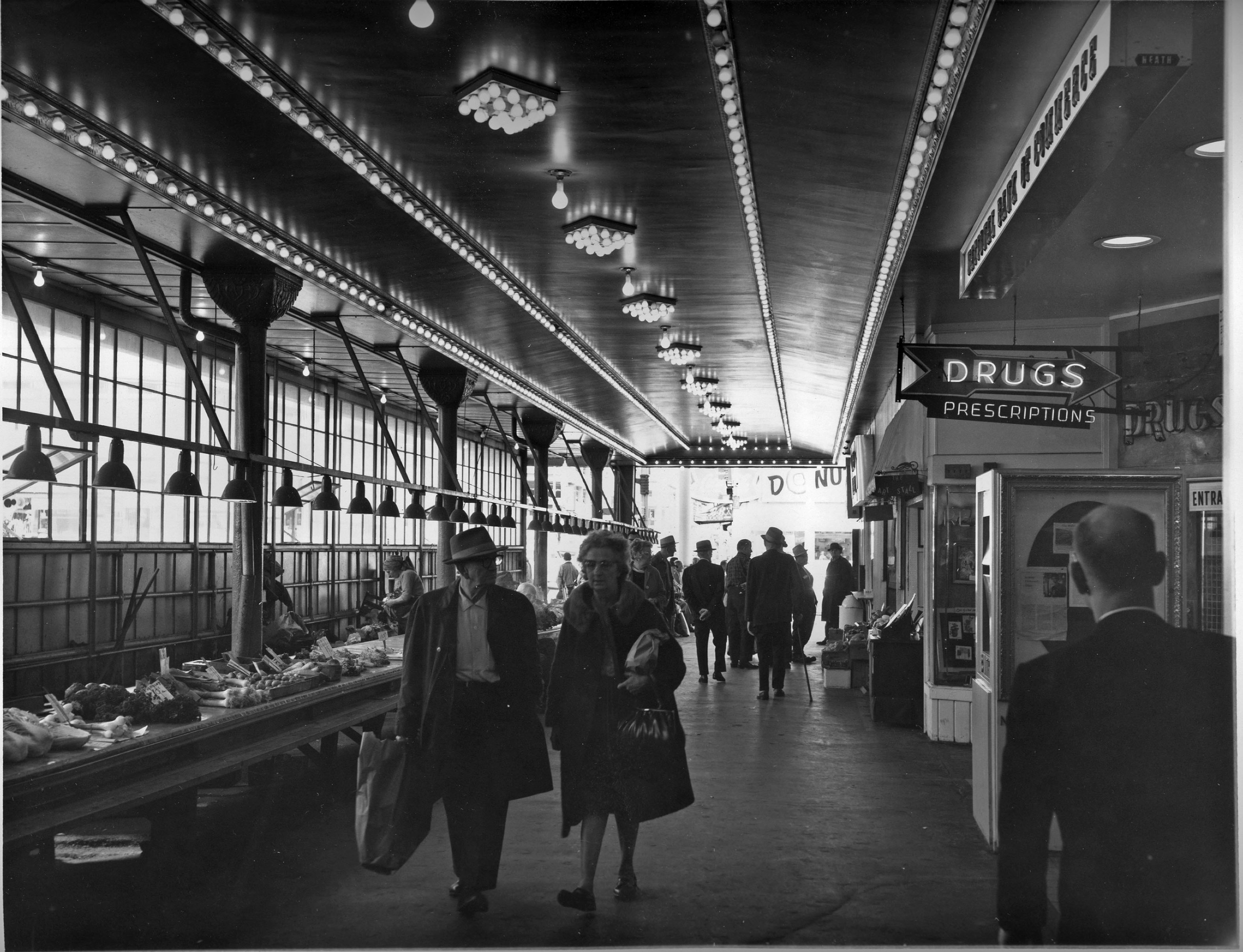
Pike Place Market, Seattle, Washington, United States, 1968

A market economy is an economic system in which decisions regarding investment, production, and commerce (the distribution of goods and services) are guided by price signals resulting from the forces of supply and demand. A key characteristic of a market economy is the presence of factor markets, which play a major role in allocating capital and other factors of production such as labor and land.

Market economies exist along a spectrum, ranging from minimally regulated to highly regulated systems. At the least regulated end are free-market and laissez-faire systems, where government involvement is largely limited to providing public goods and services and protecting private property rights.

At the other end of the spectrum are interventionist market economies, where governments take a more active role in correcting market failures and promoting social welfare. In state-directed or dirigiste systems, the government guides the broader development of the economy through tools such as industrial policies or indicative planning. In these systems, the state influences economic direction without completely replacing market-based allocation, a structure often described as a mixed economy.

Market economies are contrasted with planned economies where investment and production decisions are embodied in an integrated economy-wide economic plan. In a centrally planned economy, economic planning is the principal allocation mechanism between firms rather than markets, with the economy's means of production being owned and operated by a single organizational body.

== Characteristics ==
=== Property rights ===
For market economies to function efficiently, governments must establish clearly defined and enforceable property rights for assets and capital goods. However, property rights do not specifically mean private property rights and market economies do not logically presuppose the existence of private ownership of the means of production. Market economies can and often do include various types of cooperatives or autonomous state-owned enterprises that acquire capital goods and raw materials in capital markets. These enterprises utilize a market-determined free price system to allocate capital goods and labor. In addition, there are many variations of market socialism where the majority of capital assets are socially owned with markets allocating resources between socially owned firms. These models range from systems based on employee-owned enterprises based on self-management to a combination of public ownership of the means of production with factor markets.

=== Supply and demand ===
Supply and demand work in tandem. The economic theory is that supply slopes upwards as people buy more and demand drops as prices rise and people buy less.

Market economies rely upon a price system to signal market actors to adjust production and investment. Price formation relies on the interaction of supply and demand to reach or approximate an equilibrium where the unit price for a particular good or service is at a point where the quantity demanded equals the quantity supplied.

The price data point where the supply and demand lines intersect is called the market-clearing price.

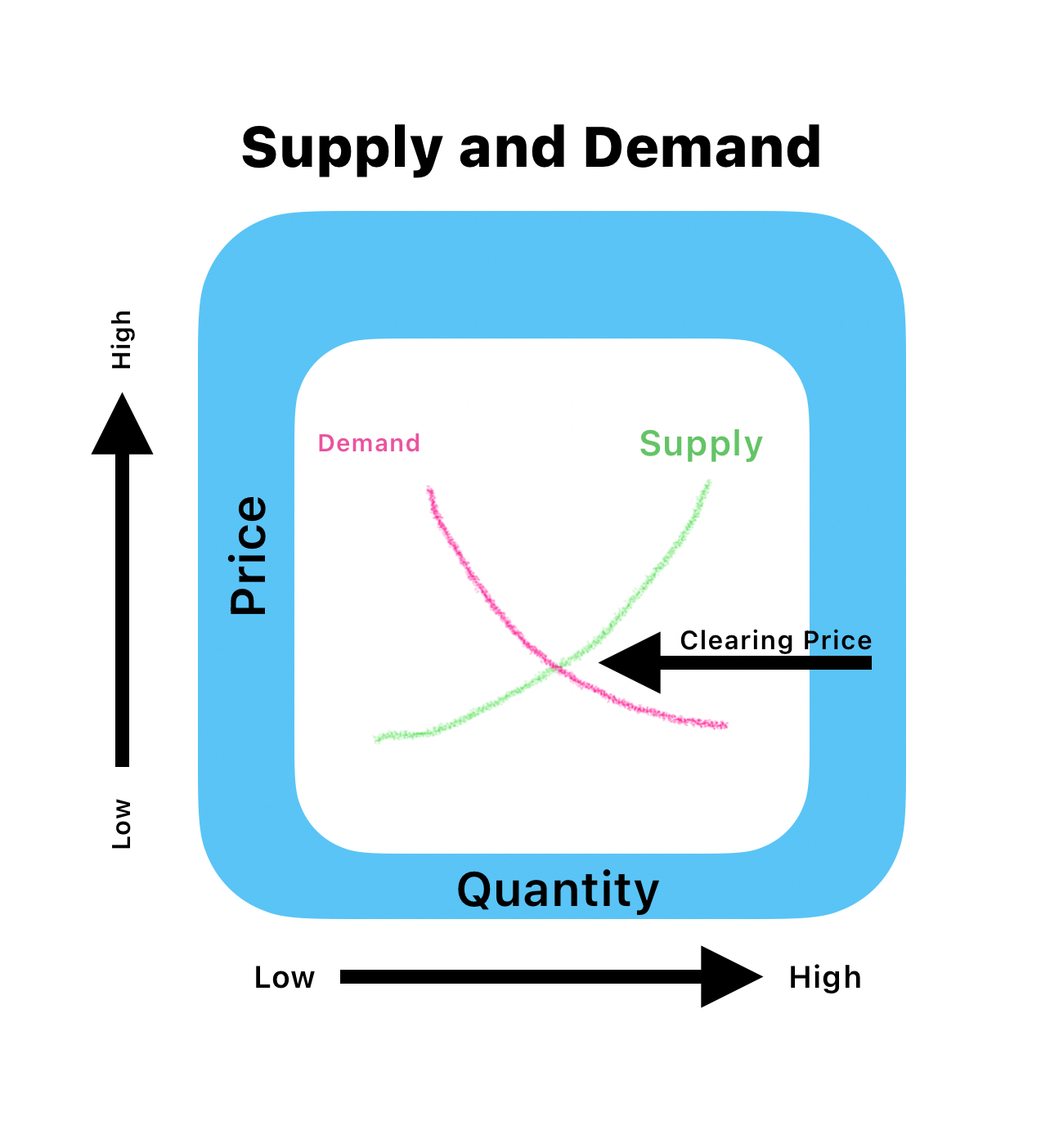
Market economy supply and demand

Governments can intervene by establishing price ceilings or price floors in specific markets (such as minimum wage laws in the labor market), or use fiscal policy to discourage certain consumer behavior or to address market externalities generated by certain transactions (Pigovian taxes). Different perspectives exist on the role of government in both regulating and guiding market economies and in addressing social inequalities produced by markets. Fundamentally, a market economy requires that a price system affected by supply and demand exists as the primary mechanism for allocating resources irrespective of the level of regulation.

== Capitalism ==
Capitalism is an economic system where the means of production are largely or entirely privately owned and operated for a profit, structured on the process of capital accumulation. In general, in capitalist systems investment, distribution, income and prices are determined by markets, whether regulated or unregulated.

There are different variations of capitalism with different relationships to markets. In laissez-faire and free-market variations of capitalism, markets are utilized most extensively with minimal or no state intervention and minimal or no regulation over prices and the supply of goods and services. In interventionist, welfare capitalism and mixed economies, markets continue to play a dominant role, but they are regulated to some extent by the government in order to correct market failures or to promote social welfare. In state capitalist systems, markets are relied upon the least, with the state relying heavily on either indicative planning and/or state-owned enterprises to accumulate capital.

Capitalism has been dominant in the Western world since the end of mercantilism. However, it is argued that the term mixed economies more precisely describes most contemporary economies due to their containing both private-owned and state-owned enterprises. In capitalism, prices determine the demand-supply scale. Higher demand for certain goods and services leads to higher prices and lower demand for certain goods lead to lower prices, in relation to supply.

=== Free-market capitalism ===
A capitalist free-market economy is an economic system where prices for goods and services are set freely by the forces of supply and demand and are expected by its supporters to reach their point of equilibrium without intervention by government policy. It typically entails support for highly competitive markets, private ownership of productive enterprises. Laissez-faire is a more extensive form of free-market economy where the role of the state is limited to protecting property rights and enforcing contracts.

=== Laissez-faire ===
Laissez-faire is synonymous with what was referred to as strict free-market economy during the early and mid-19th century as a classical liberal ideal to achieve. It is generally understood that the necessary components for the functioning of an idealized free market include the complete absence of government regulation, subsidies, artificial price pressures and government-granted monopolies (usually classified as coercive monopoly by free market advocates) and no taxes or tariffs other than what is necessary for the government to provide protection from coercion and theft, maintaining peace and property rights and providing for basic public goods. Right-libertarian advocates of anarcho-capitalism see the state as morally illegitimate and economically unnecessary and destructive. Although laissez-faire has been commonly associated with capitalism, there is a similar left-wing laissez-faire system called free-market anarchism, also known as free-market anti-capitalism and free-market socialism to distinguish it from laissez-faire capitalism. Thus, critics of laissez-faire as commonly understood argues that a truly laissez-faire system would be anti-capitalist and socialist.

=== Welfare capitalism ===
Welfare capitalism is a capitalist economy that includes public policies favoring extensive provisions for social welfare services. The economic mechanism involves a free market and the predominance of privately owned enterprises in the economy, but public provision of universal welfare services aimed at enhancing individual autonomy and maximizing equality. Examples of contemporary welfare capitalism include the Nordic model of capitalism predominant in Northern Europe.

=== Regional models ===
==== Anglo-Saxon model ====
Anglo-Saxon capitalism is the form of capitalism predominant in Anglophone countries and typified by the economy of the United States. It is contrasted with European models of capitalism such as the continental social market model and the Nordic model. Anglo-Saxon capitalism refers to a macroeconomic policy regime and capital market structure common to the Anglophone economies. Among these characteristics are low rates of taxation, more open international markets, lower labor market protections and a less generous welfare state eschewing collective bargaining schemes found in the continental and northern European models of capitalism.

==== East Asian model ====
The East Asian model of capitalism involves a strong role for state investment and in some instances involves state-owned enterprises. The state takes an active role in promoting economic development through subsidies, the facilitation of "national champions" and an export-based model of growth. The actual practice of this model varies by country. This designation has been applied to the economies of China, Japan, Singapore, South Korea, Vietnam, and sometimes to those of Hong Kong and Taiwan.

A related concept in political science is the developmental state.

==== Social market economy ====
The social market economy was implemented by Alfred Müller-Armack and Ludwig Erhard after World War II in West Germany. The social market economic model, sometimes called Rhine capitalism, is based upon the idea of realizing the benefits of a free-market economy, especially economic performance and high supply of goods while avoiding disadvantages such as market failure, destructive competition, concentration of economic power and the socially harmful effects of market processes. The aim of the social market economy is to realize greatest prosperity combined with best possible social security. One difference from the free market economy is that the state is not passive, but instead takes active regulatory measures. The social policy objectives include employment, housing and education policies, as well as a socio-politically motivated balancing of the distribution of income growth. Characteristics of social market economies are a strong competition policy and a contractionary monetary policy. The philosophical background is neoliberalism or ordoliberalism.

== Socialism ==
Market socialism is a form of market economy where the means of production are socially owned, such as through worker co-operatives. In a market socialist economy, firms operate according to the rules of supply and demand and operate to maximize profit; the principal difference between market socialism and capitalism being that the profits accrue either directly to the workers of the company or society as a whole as opposed to private owners.

The distinguishing feature between non-market socialism and market socialism is the existence of a market for factors of production and the criteria of profitability for enterprises. Profits derived from publicly owned enterprises can variously be used to reinvest in further production, to directly finance government and social services, or be distributed to the public at large through a social dividend or basic income system.

Advocates of market socialism such as Jaroslav Vaněk argue that genuinely free markets are not possible under conditions of private ownership of productive property. Instead, he contends that the class differences and inequalities in income and power that result from private ownership enable the interests of the dominant class to skew the market to their favor, either in the form of monopoly and market power, or by utilizing their wealth and resources to legislate government policies that benefit their specific business interests. Additionally, Vaněk states that workers in a socialist economy based on cooperative and self-managed enterprises have stronger incentives to maximize productivity because they would receive a share of the profits (based on the overall performance of their enterprise) in addition to receiving their fixed wage or salary. The stronger incentives to maximize productivity that he conceives as possible in a socialist economy based on cooperative and self-managed enterprises might be accomplished in a free-market economy if cooperatives were the norm as envisioned by various thinkers including Louis O. Kelso and James S. Albus.

=== Models of market socialism ===
Market socialism traces its roots to classical economics and the works of Adam Smith, the Ricardian socialists and mutualist philosophers.

In the 1930s, the economists Oskar Lange and Abba Lerner developed a model of socialism that posited that a public body (dubbed the Central Planning Board) could set prices through a trial-and-error approach until they equaled the marginal cost of production in order to achieve perfect competition and pareto optimality. In this model of socialism, firms would be state-owned and managed by their employees and the profits would be disbursed among the population in a social dividend. This model came to be referred to as market socialism because it involved the use of money, a price system and simulated capital markets, all of which were absent from traditional non-market socialism.

A more contemporary model of market socialism is that put forth by the American economist John Roemer, referred to as economic democracy. In this model, social ownership is achieved through public ownership of equity in a market economy. A Bureau of Public Ownership would own controlling shares in publicly listed firms, so that the profits generated would be used for public finance and the provision of a basic income.

Some anarchists and libertarian socialists promote a form of market socialism in which enterprises are owned and managed cooperatively by their workforce so that the profits directly remunerate the employee-owners. These cooperative enterprises would compete with each other in the same way private companies compete with each other in a capitalist market. The first major elaboration of this type of market socialism was made by Pierre-Joseph Proudhon and was called mutualism.

Self-managed market socialism was promoted in Yugoslavia by economists Branko Horvat and Jaroslav Vaněk. In the self-managed model of socialism, firms would be directly owned by their employees and the management board would be elected by employees. These cooperative firms would compete with each other in a market for both capital goods and for selling consumer goods.

=== Socialist market economy ===
Following the reform and opening up that began in 1978, China developed what it calls a socialist market economy in which most of the economy is under state ownership, with the state enterprises organized as joint-stock companies with various government agencies owning controlling shares through a shareholder system. Prices are set by a largely free-price system and the state-owned enterprises are not subjected to micromanagement by a government planning agency. A similar system called socialist-oriented market economy has emerged in Vietnam following the Đổi Mới reforms in 1986. This system is frequently characterized as state capitalism instead of market socialism because there is no meaningful degree of employee self-management in firms, because the state enterprises retain their profits instead of distributing them to the workforce or government and because many function as de facto private enterprises. The profits neither finance a social dividend to benefit the population at large, nor do they accrue to their employees. In China, this economic model is presented as a preliminary stage of socialism to explain the dominance of capitalistic management practices and forms of enterprise organization in both the state and non-state sectors.

== In religion ==
A wide range of philosophers and theologians have linked market economies to concepts from monotheistic religions. Michael Novak described capitalism as being closely related to Catholicism, but Max Weber drew a connection between capitalism and Protestantism. The economist Jeffrey Sachs has stated that his work was inspired by the healing characteristics of Judaism. Chief Rabbi Lord Sacks of the United Synagogue draws a correlation between modern capitalism and the Jewish image of the Golden Calf.

=== Christianity ===
In the Christian faith, the liberation theology movement advocated involving the church in labor market capitalism. Many priests and nuns integrated themselves into labor organizations while others moved into the slums to live among the poor. The Holy Trinity was interpreted as a call for social equality and the elimination of poverty. However, the Pope John Paul II was highly active in his criticism of liberation theology. He was particularly concerned about the increased fusion between Christianity and Marxism. He closed Catholic institutions that taught liberation theology and dismissed some of its activists from the church.

=== Buddhism ===
The Buddhist approach to the market economy was dealt with in E. F. Schumacher's 1966 essay "Buddhist Economics". Schumacher asserted that a market economy guided by Buddhist principles would more successfully meet the needs of its people. He emphasized the importance of pursuing occupations that adhered to Buddhist teachings. The essay would later become required reading for a course that Clair Brown offered at University of California, Berkeley.

== Criticism ==
The economist Joseph Stiglitz argues that markets suffer from informational inefficiency and the presumed efficiency of markets stems from the faulty assumptions of neoclassical welfare economics, particularly the assumption of perfect and costless information and related incentive problems. Neoclassical economics assumes static equilibrium and efficient markets require that there be no non-convexities, even though nonconvexities are pervasive in modern economies. Stiglitz's critique applies to both existing models of capitalism and to hypothetical models of market socialism. However, Stiglitz does not advocate replacing markets, but instead states that there is a significant role for government intervention to boost the efficiency of markets and to address the pervasive market failures that exist in contemporary economies. A fair market economy is in fact a martingale or a Brownian motion model and for a participant competitor in such a model there is no more than 50% of success chances at any given moment. Due to the fractal nature of any fair market and being market participants subject to the law of competition which impose reinvesting an increasing part of profits, the mean statistical chance of bankruptcy within the half life of any participant is also 50% and 100% whether an infinite sample of time is considered.

Robin Hahnel and Michael Albert claim that "markets inherently produce class division". Albert states that even if everyone started out with a balanced job complex (doing a mix of roles of varying creativity, responsibility and empowerment) in a market economy, class divisions would arise, arguing:

Without taking the argument that far, it is evident that in a market system with uneven distribution of empowering work, such as Economic Democracy, some workers will be more able than others to capture the benefits of economic gain. For example, if one worker designs cars and another builds them, the designer will use his cognitive skills more frequently than the builder. In the long term, the designer will become more adept at conceptual work than the builder, giving the former greater bargaining power in a firm over the distribution of income. A conceptual worker who is not satisfied with his income can threaten to work for a company that will pay him more. The effect is a class division between conceptual and manual laborers, and ultimately managers and workers, and a de facto labor market for conceptual workers.

David McNally argues in the Marxist tradition that the logic of the market inherently produces inequitable outcomes and leads to unequal exchanges, arguing that Adam Smith's moral intent and moral philosophy espousing equal exchange was undermined by the practice of the free markets he championed. The development of the market economy involved coercion, exploitation and violence that Smith's moral philosophy could not countenance. McNally also criticizes market socialists for believing in the possibility of fair markets based on equal exchanges to be achieved by purging parasitical elements from the market economy such as private ownership of the means of production. McNally argues that market socialism is an oxymoron when socialism is defined as an end to wage-based labor.

== The role of supply and demand in a market economy ==
Supply and demand play an instrumental role in driving market economies by setting both prices and quantities traded in markets. Supply is defined as any increase in price leading to an increase in supply from producers; demand on the other hand means any drop leads to an increase in desired quantities from consumers; these two laws meet at equilibrium when provided quantity equals quantity demanded - known as equilibrium price/quantity equilibrium point. Prices play an extremely vital role in market economies by providing important information about commodity and service availability. When there is strong demand but limited supply, prices increase, signaling to producers that there may be opportunities to increase profits by producing more of that product. Conversely, when there is low demand with increased supply then prices reduce, showing manufacturers they must either reduce output or find methods of cutting costs in order to stay competitive and remain profitable.

External factors, including shifting technological standards, new government laws, and natural catastrophes can have a substantial impact on supply and demand. Technological innovations may increase supply, while laws issued by governments could decrease it or even demand. Natural disasters have the ability to severely disrupt supply chains, creating shortages of key items that increase costs while simultaneously decreasing demand. Supply and demand play an indispensable role in any market economy by ensuring prices reflect market forces accurately, adapting accordingly as conditions shift between supply and demand situations, while producers adjust production according to price signals from consumers, fulfilling customers' requests while giving individuals freedom in making purchasing choices based on personal preferences or financial constraints. Thus supply and demand play an instrumental part in shaping and stabilizing economies governed by market forces.

== Sustainable market economy ==
A sustainable market economy seeks to balance economic expansion and environmental preservation. It acknowledges that sustainable environmental protection and resource management are essential for long-term economic growth. To achieve this balance, implementing sustainable practices across sectors, such as lowering carbon emissions, developing renewable energy sources, and putting circular economy ideas into practice. Tax incentives, carbon trading programs, and environmental requirements are just a few ways government rules and policies encourage enterprises to adopt sustainable practices.

At the same time, consumer demand for eco-friendly goods and services and understanding of these issues may influence market dynamics to favour more sustainable options. A sustainable market economy may encourage innovation, provide green employment, and guarantee the welfare of future generations by incorporating environmental factors into economic decision-making. Prioritizing sustainability while preserving economic development needs cooperation between governments, corporations, and people.

== See also ==
- Crony capitalism
- Corporatism
- Co-determination
- Economic freedom
- Gift economy
- Grey market
- Keynesian economics
- Market failure
- Market structure
- Monopoly
- Neoclassical economics
- Planned economy
- Regulated market
