= Geoffroy Didier =

French lawyer and politician (born 1976)

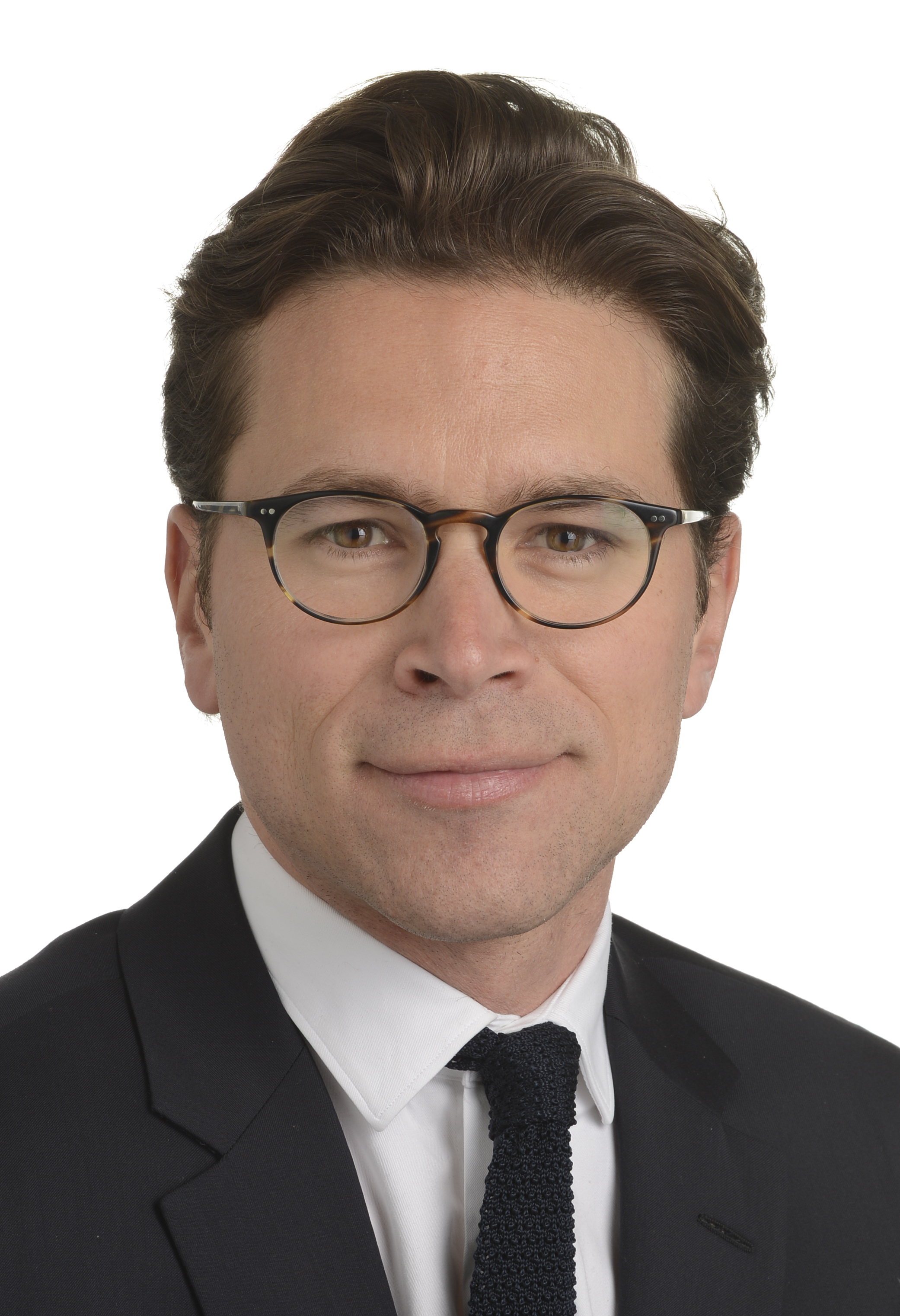
- S

Member of the European Parliament
- In office 1 December 2017 – 15 July 2024
- Constituency: Île-de-France (2017–2019); France (2019–2024)

Member of the Regional Council of Île-de-France
- Incumbent
- Assumed office 26 March 2010

Personal details
- Born: 12 April 1976 (age 50) Boulogne-Billancourt, France
- Party: Union for a Popular Movement (until 2015); The Republicans (2015–present)
- Education: Sciences Po; Paris 2 Panthéon-Assas University; Columbia University
- Occupation: Lawyer

Geoffroy Didier (French pronunciation: [ʒɔfʁwa didje]; born 12 April 1976) is a French lawyer and politician who served as a Member of the European Parliament (MEP) from December 2017 to July 2024. A member of The Republicans (LR), he has also held a seat in the Regional Council of Île-de-France since 2010.

== Early life and education ==
Didier graduated from Sciences Po in 1998 and obtained a master's degree in business law from the University of Paris II Panthéon-Assas in 1999. He also holds a degree from ESSEC Business School (2004).

== Political career ==
=== Career in national politics ===
In 2008, Didier worked as an advisor to Minister of Immigration, Integration, National Identity and Cooperative Development Brice Hortefeux in the government of Prime Minister François Fillon.

During the campaign for the 2012 presidential election, Didier served as deputy spokesman for candidate Nicolas Sarkozy, along with Franck Riester, Guillaume Peltier, Valérie Debord and Salima Saa. After the elections, he joined forces with Guillaume Peltier in founded The Strong Right, a conservative faction within the Union for a Popular Movement (UMP). He also became the party's deputy secretary general, under the leadership of chairman Jean-François Copé. In addition, he became a member of the Friends of Nicolas Sarkozy group.

Considered close to Valérie Pécresse, Didier played a prominent role in many of her political campaigns, including when she became the head of the Paris region in the 2015 elections.

In March 2016, Didier announced his candidacy for the Republicans’ primaries ahead of the 2017 French presidential election, but failed to secure a sufficient number of votes. He later endorsed Alain Juppé as the party's candidate for the office of President of France before supporting the campaign of François Fillon.

=== Member of the European Parliament, 2017–2024 ===
Didier unsuccessfully ran as a candidate for the 2014 European elections. However, when Constance Le Grip stood down as a Member of the Parliament to move to the National Assembly, Didier took her seat in June 2017. During his time in parliament, he served on the Committee on Legal Affairs, where he became the parliament's rapporteur on the 2021 Digital Services Act. In 2020, he also joined the Special Committee on Artificial Intelligence in a Digital Age.

In addition to his committee assignments, Didier was a member of the delegation for relations with the United States.

In the party's 2017 leadership election, Didier supported Laurent Wauquiez. When Wauquiez resigned from the Republicans’ leadership in 2019, Didier was considered by news media as a potential successor but soon announced that he would not be putting himself forward for the position; instead, he endorsed Christian Jacob.

In addition to his parliamentary mandate, Didier worked for law firm CARLARA with offices in Paris and Brussels.

=== Later political career ===
In the Republicans' 2025 leadership election, Didier endorsed Wauquiez to succeed Éric Ciotti as the party's new chair and joined his campaign team.

== Political positions ==
In early 2020, Didier called on High Representative of the Union for Foreign Affairs and Security Policy Josep Borrell in a letter to suspend the EU-Japan Strategic Partnership Agreement and demand action against cases of so-called parental child abduction affecting Europeans living in Japan.
