= La Droite Forte =

Former French political faction

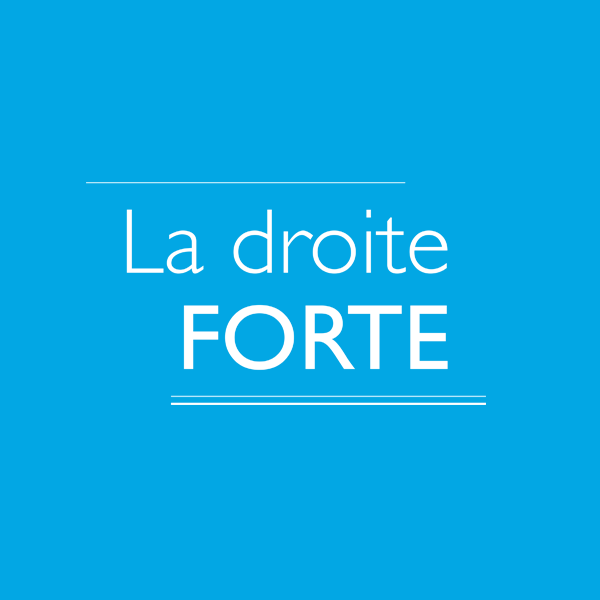
- Founder: Guillaume Peltier; Geoffroy Didier
- Founded: July 2012
- Dissolved: July 2018
- Ideology: Sarkozysm; Social conservatism Christian democracy
- Political position: Right-wing
- National affiliation: Union for a Popular Movement
- Colours: Blue, red

Website
- www.ladroiteforte.fr

La Droite Forte lit. 'The Strong Right' was a conservative faction within the Union for a Popular Movement (UMP) and later The Republicans (LR). It was created as a faction in July 2012 by Guillaume Peltier and Geoffroy Didier.

== Ideology ==
The motion's declaration of principles stated that its leaders were "attached to patriotism, merit, hard work, effort [...], republican authority, supporting SMEs, fighting fraud and welfare dependency, sovereignty [...]". As such, the movement is widely identified as a national conservative and social conservative faction, very supportive of and seeking to identify with former President Nicolas Sarkozy. Indeed, the movement's name is a direct reference to Sarkozy's slogan in the 2012 presidential election, la France forte ('Strong France').

In October 2012, Guillaume Peltier created controversy when he proposed to reserve certain positions in public broadcasting for right-wing journalists, abolishing public financing for trade unions, and reforming - potentially abolishing - teachers' right to strike.

== Weight within the UMP ==
At the November 2012 congress, the Strong Right placed first with 27.77% of the motions vote.

== Leadership and supporters ==
The movement's leaders are Guillaume Peltier, a former member of the National Front's youth wing and Philippe de Villiers' Movement for France; and Geoffroy Didier, a regional councillor in Île-de-France.

Parliamentarians which co-signed the motion included: Bernard Accoyer, Roland Chassain, Édouard Courtial, Brice Hortefeux, Alain Marleix, Camille de Rocca Serra and Michèle Tabarot. Parliamentarians could co-sign more than one motion.

Claude Guéant joined the movement in February 2013.
