= Roger Chudeau =

French politician (born 1949)

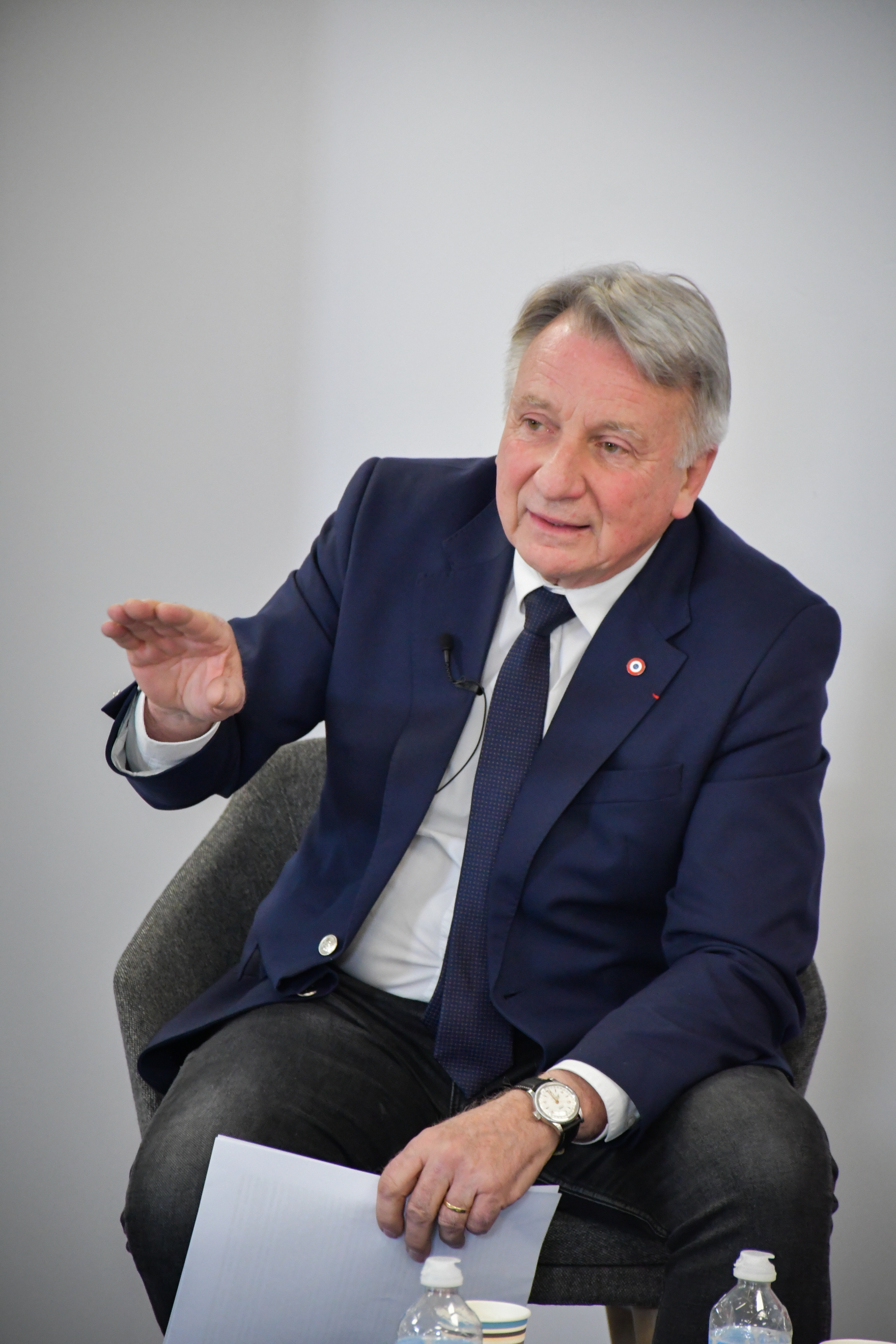

Member of the National Assembly for Loir-et-Cher's 2nd constituency
- Incumbent
- Assumed office 22 June 2022
- Preceded by: Guillaume Peltier

Personal details
- Born: 28 September 1949 (age 76) Berlin, Germany
- Party: National Rally (2021–present)
- Other political affiliations: Rally for the Republic (1988–2002); Union for a Popular Movement (2002–2015); The Republicans (2015–2017)

Roger Chudeau (French pronunciation: [ʁɔʒe ʃydo]; born 28 September 1949) is a French politician and retired senior civil servant who has represented the 2nd constituency of the Loir-et-Cher department in the National Assembly since 2022. A former inspector at the Ministry of National Education and an education advisor in Prime Minister François Fillon's cabinet (2007–2008), he is a member of the National Rally (RN) and formerly of The Republicans (LR).

== Biography ==
=== Career ===
Chudeau was born in 1949. He holds a degree in German and worked as a high school teacher before becoming a school inspector with the Inspector General of National Education (IEN). In 2008, he was appointed Director of Supervision of the Ministry of National Education and the Ministry of Higher Education and Research.

=== Politics ===
Chudeau became a member of the Rally for the Republic in 1988 and its successor parties including The Republicans. He was close to François Fillon during his time as Prime Minister and in the Cabinet of François Fillon he became Fillon's advisor on education. Following the defeat of Fillon during the 2017 French presidential election, he briefly retired from politics before joining the National Rally in 2021.

Ahead of the 2022 French legislative election, he contested the seat of Loir-et-Cher's 2nd constituency which was held by former Republicans politician Guillaume Peltier who had defected to Reconquête. Chudeau was successful at winning the seat in the second round.

During the 2024 French legislative election Chudeau made comments that dual nationals (specifically Najat Vallaud-Belkacem) should not hold ministerial posts. For these comments Marine Le Pen disavowed the idea that of restricting ministerial posts on basis of dual nationality and added that Chudeau's comments were contrary to the RN's programme.
