= Economy of East Asia =

Statistics
- Population: 1.6 billion
- GDP: ▲$28.62 trillion (nominal; 2026 est); ▲$58.09 trillion (PPP; 2026 est)
- GDP growth: ▲3.8% (2026 est.)
- GDP per capita: ▲$17,776 (nominal; 2026 est); ▲$36,081 (PPP; 2026 est)
- Inflation (CPI): 1.6% (2026 est.)
- Unemployment: 4.2% (2021)

Public finance
- Government debt: 105.9% of GDP (2023 est.)
- Most numbers are from the International Monetary Fund. IMF East Asia Datasets All values, unless otherwise stated, are in US dollars.

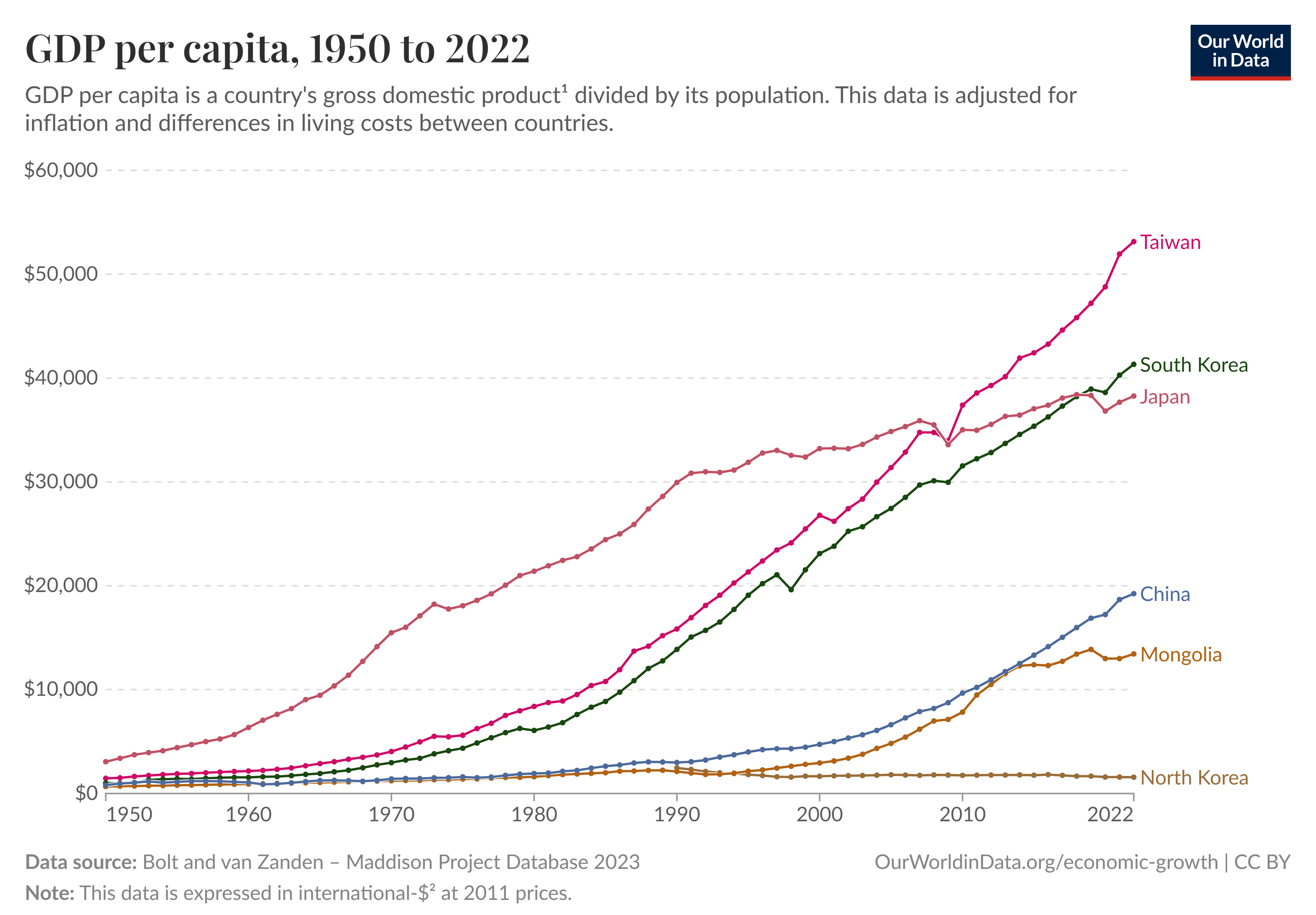
GDP per capita of East Asia adjusted for inflation and purchasing power (1950–2022)

The economy of East Asia comprises 1.6 billion people (20% of the world population) living in six different countries and regions. The region includes several of the world's largest and most prosperous economies: Taiwan, Japan, South Korea, China, Hong Kong, and Macau. It is home to some of the most economically dynamic places in the world, being the site of some of the world's most extended modern economic booms, including the Taiwan miracle (1950–present) in Taiwan, Miracle on the Han River (1974–present) in South Korea, Japanese economic miracle (1950–1990) and the Chinese economic miracle (1983–2010) in China.

East Asia's economic prominence has grown significantly in recent years, increasing its importance and influence in Asia and the world economy. Recent developments have led to an expanding cosmopolitan middle class. East Asian countries are vital contributors to central global communications and trade networks, developing relations with other nations, including those of the Western world, making them a significant contributor to the global economy. The region's economic success was referred to as "An East Asian Renaissance" by the World Bank in 2007.

Since the early 20th century, East Asia has been home to two of the world's largest economies, with mainland China and Japan being the second and third largest, respectively. Since the middle of the twentieth century, capitalism has been integrated with the Confucian nature of Oriental East Asia. In defiance of an array of sociopolitical challenges, the East Asian economies turned into a modern economic miracle. Sustained efforts of veering East Asia into a capitalist direction have created remarkable outcomes in terms of resilience, dynamism, growth, and economic prosperity.

Even as late as the mid-twentieth century, East Asia remained nonindustrial, poverty-stricken, and torn by the ravages of World War II. Since the 1960s, Japan, South Korea, Taiwan, Hong Kong, Macau, and mainland China have achieved a modern economic takeoff leaving the economic rise of modern East Asia to become one of the most important economic success stories in modern world history. Despite decades of setbacks and turmoil, East Asia is now one of the world's most economically prosperous and technologically advanced regions.

Rapid modernisation, and a focus on high technology, have allowed East Asia to register rapid economic growth. The region is home to some of the world's most affluent nations and sees high standards of living. Japan saw rapid re-modernisation in the aftermath of World War II and, during the 1950s and early 1960s, increased its dominance in global trade, aided by its focus on innovation in automobiles and advanced consumer electronics, making it the world's third-largest economy after the United States and mainland China.

The rise of the Four Asian Tigers, including South Korea, Taiwan and Hong Kong, was characterised by unprecedented growth during the 1970s–1980s, placing themselves among the world's most prosperous and dynamic economies. Mainland China's continued growth and economic development, aided by its entry into the World Trade Organization in 2001, has made the country a significant contributor to the East Asian economy and increased its recognition as a major player in the world economy. In addition, South Korea and Taiwan are among the largest manufacturers of consumer technology globally, while Hong Kong is widely recognized as a leading worldwide financial centre.

== History ==
Ancient East Asia was economically dominated by two states known today as China and Japan. These two ancient states traded abundant raw materials and high-quality manufactured goods, exchanged cultural ideas and practices, and had military conflicts with each other throughout the centuries.

=== China ===
For much of East Asia's history, China was the largest and most advanced economy in the region and globally as a whole. Historically from the 1st until the 19th century, China was one of the leading global economic powers for most of the two millennia. The history of trade in East Asia was largely shaped by the history of trade within Ancient China. During the Han dynasty, China gradually became the largest economy in the ancient world.

Han China hosted the largest unified population in East Asia, the most literate and urbanised, the most economically developed, and the most technologically and culturally advanced civilisation in the region at the time. Han China had economic contacts with Persia and the Roman empire, trading silk, minerals, and spices through the famous Silk Road.

During the Tang dynasty, China had a multitude of religions that invigorated the many dynamic aspects of Tang cultural and intellectual life. This productive economy generated substantial tax revenues to fund a competent, credible, and efficient political bureaucracy that administered a vast empire and possessed the world's most advanced science and technology. By 1100, the Song dynasty hosted a population of almost 100 million people while large cities had over 1 million inhabitants, a sophisticated medieval economic system boasting the use of paper money (written business contracts, mercantile credits, checks, promissory notes, bills of exchange), and was a maritime naval power with extensive and flourishing trade contacts with Southeast Asia. For much of East Asia's economic history, China was one of the most developed economies. After the Fall of the Western Roman Empire, for a thousand years, from 500 AD to 1500 AD, China was the wealthiest country in East Asia in the aggregate total in addition to per capita income.

According to The Economist, China was not only the largest economy for much of recorded history for 1800 years of the past two millennia, but it was the world's largest until the end of the 15th century boasting the world's highest per capita income and most advanced technology at the time. Throughout this period, China outperformed its fellow East Asian and distant European counterparts regarding technological development and economic growth, culminating in its ability to maintain a massive territorial empire throughout succeeding medieval Chinese dynasties.

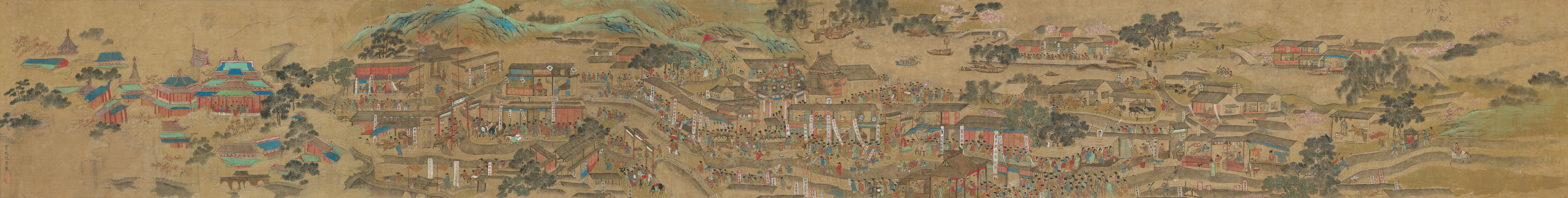
The Bustling and Hustling of Southern Capital by Qiu Ying shows the burgeoning urban economy in Ming China

Despite economic stagnation after 1450 and the rise of early modern Europe, China's economy remained the world's largest from the 1500s until 1820 as the world's most populous country and remained the world's largest economy up until 1885, a figure higher than the US economy at the height of its economic dominance after World War II. China was the wealthiest part of the world from 1200 to the 1300s — aside from Italy until the European Renaissance took off during the late Middle Ages and the modern Western World and Japan overtook China during the mid- and late 19th century. China accounted for around one-quarter of the global GDP until the late 1700s, and approximately one-third of the global GDP in 1820 as the Industrial Revolution was beginning in Great Britain. China's GDP in 1820 was six times as large as Britain's, the largest economy in Europe — and almost 20 times the GDP of the nascent United States.

=== Japan ===
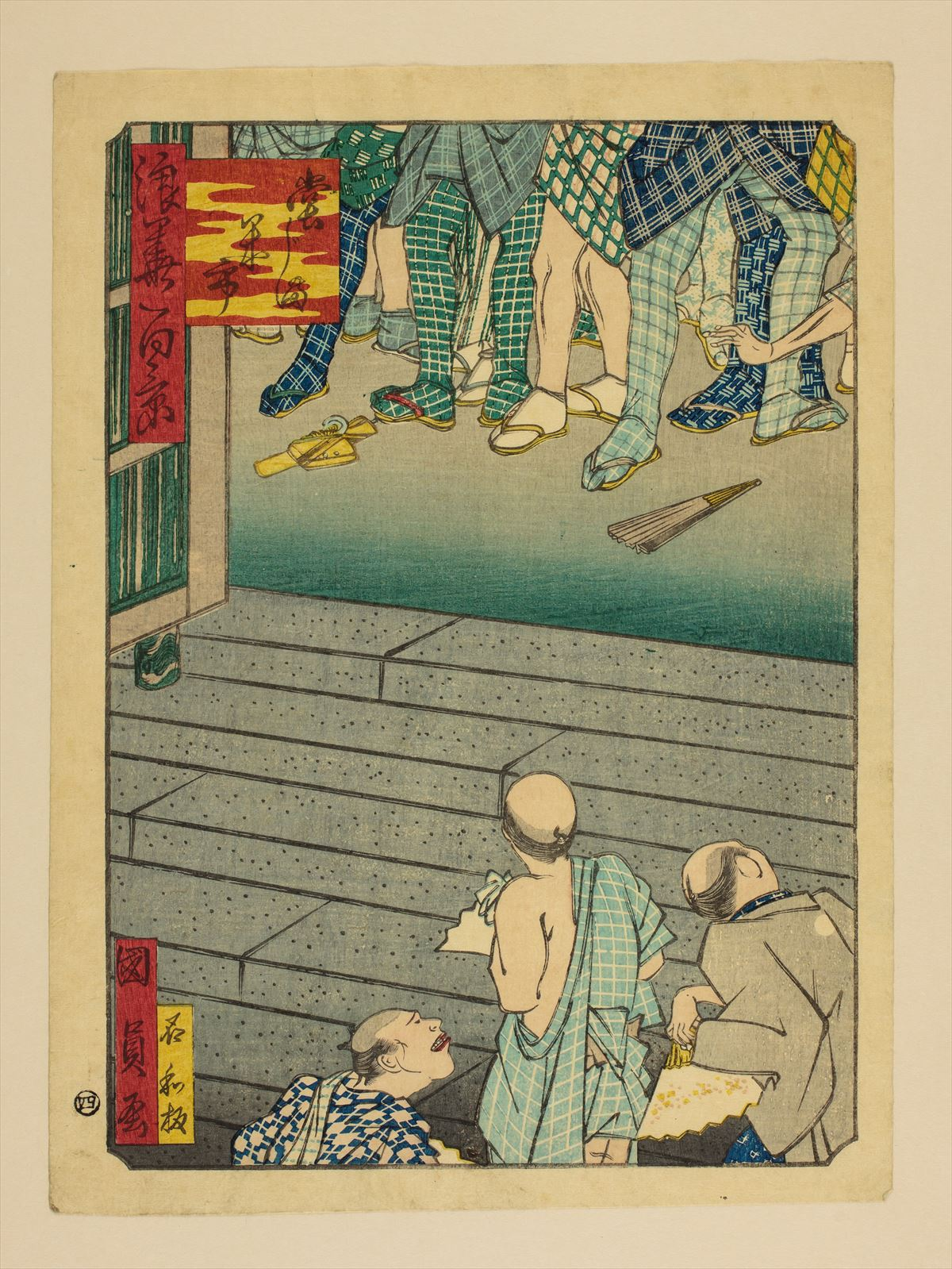
Dōjima Rice Exchange (堂島米會所) was Japan’s first organized futures market, established in Osaka in 1730; it is considered one of the world's earliest examples of a commodity futures exchange

Ancient Chinese coinage and money was introduced to Japan about 1500 years ago during the early Han dynasty. The Japanese did not mint coins from copper and silver until 708 AD and paper money was introduced in 1661. Japan during the Yayoi period engaged in intensive rice agriculture in paddy fields introduced from southern China via the Ryukyu Islands which developed a manorial feudal economy similar to that of medieval Europe.

As the Yayoi economy used no form of currency, bartering was used to trade goods and services, predominantly farm implements. Yayoi farmers fished, hunted, gathered and farmed. The introduction of a highly advanced form of rice cultivation using irrigation propelled the Yayoi economy. Terraced paddy fields made the Yayoi more successful in the growing of rice that surpluses were often produced. The agricultural surpluses produced by the manorial Yayoi economy stimulated Japan's early handicraft industries and the establishment of urban villages and permanent settlements started to appear in the Yayoi agricultural community as cities didn't exist at that time.

As the Yayoi economy became more sophisticated, Japanese craftsmen began to venture in metallurgy and began to develop their own tools such as swords, arrowheads, axes, chisels, knives, sickles, and fishhooks. Decorative items such as ceremonial bells and mirrors were used as religious rituals and status symbols. As the Yayoi population increased, the society became more stratified and complex. They wove textiles, lived in permanent farming villages, and constructed buildings with wood and stone. Yayoi merchants and farmers also accumulated wealth through land ownership and the storage of grain. Such factors promoted the development of distinct social classes. Contemporary Chinese sources described the people as having tattoos and other bodily markings which indicated differences in socioeconomic status.

In ancient Japan, a person's wealth was described in kokus and measured in bales of rice. One koku was 47 U.S. gallons (180 liters) of rice. As rice signified money, large quantities of rice had to be stored and distributed nationally. Moreover, the imperial Japanese tax system was based on rice and it taxed peasants with rice and paid the salaries of high ranking government workers with it. Additional trade goods made from rice such as sake, rice wine, and vinegar were used as commodity money. Soon, rice played an important role in Japan's economy and was used as currency for more than a millennium. Small amounts of trade Japan and China began around 2000 BC when Chinese merchants sailed across the East China Sea to Japan in wooden canoes. The two nations increased their economic relations greatly by the 1st century AD when Japanese envoys were sent to Korea and China. Japanese silk was in high demand by the ancient Koreans and Chinese as it was used to produce clothing. Bronze tools and gold was traded with the Koreans while Chinese traded bronze mirrors, bells, swords, spearheads, rice and gold ores mined in the Japanese mountains.

From the end of the 7th century to the 8th century, Japan introduced various sociopolitical systems imported from Tang China in order to create a centralized government based on the medieval Japanese ritsuryo code. The Yamato government began minting coins in 708 AD. Copper coins were modeled after the Chinese coins. The coins were not widely used as the Yamato government had trouble distributing to isolated villages. Soon the national currency was reverted to rice instead of coins to exchange for goods and services. There was a decline in the usage and circulation of minted coins by the 10th century as Japanese society began to lose faith in the value of the copper coins as the coins began more diminutive in size and the quality was diluted with an increase in lead due to a shortage of copper. By the mid-10th century, the mintage of copper coins began to phase out and the use of commodity money such as rice, silk, and clothes which all maintained stable value were used in place of the coins. Commodity money began to gain economic value and status and became the stable criteria for evaluating monetary value of various goods and services. Since carrying rice, silk, and clothes was cumbersome and inconvenient, a credit economy emerged to burden the shoulder of transportation and handling costs. Government offices in the Japanese capital issued payment orders similar to modern-day checks to rice warehouses under their political constituencies.

The Japanese economy enjoyed a period of growth and prosperity during the medieval era. As medieval Japanese society became more advanced, East Asia's first marketplaces began to take root as entrepreneurial merchants and artisans supplied manufactured goods to opening markets throughout the entire country. Self-employed artisans lived in settlements as villages and towns began to take shape, creating a tradition of handicrafts. As the marketplaces became more sophisticated and advanced, market towns began to develop with important food and livestock markets and feudal landlords would begin to cash in on crops worked and tilled by peasants. Major cities would grow into silk, porcelain, and cotton centers providing work for a lot of people and made inter-regional trade easier so merchants and consumers participated in a local market system to exchange goods and services with one another. In addition, improvements in agriculture contributed to economic growth as new strains of rice resisted droughts and disease, and fertilizers allowed double cropping of fields with better irrigation techniques to help farmers produce greater surpluses. The use of copper-alloy coins greatly facilitated Japanese estates to sell extra produce in the marketplaces. In addition, merchants began to form their own communities and began to exercise economic power and great wealth even though Japan was dominated by a feudal-military system led by warrior samurais and daimyos who exercised great control over various competing semi-autonomous domains across the Japanese archipelago.

In the middle of the 12th century, Chinese coins began to flow into Japan and were beginning to be used as a form of currency. Coins became widespread by the 13th century as the use of the coins was spread among commoners and the Kamakura Shogunate government and imperial court, which initially disapproved of their use, but eventually accepted the used of the coins. Coins eventually replaced bartering and commodity money such as rice, silk, and hemp as a form of economic exchange. These coins were widely circulated throughout the medieval Japanese economy, and coins promoted the commodity economy. The Japanese government suspended the issue of coins until the 16th century, leaving Japanese commoners with only the Chinese coins (toraisen) to use. To address the increased demand for coins, privately minted Japanese coins (shichusen) were circulated, but the quality of these coins differed by type. The Japanese began to classify these various coins by type or quality (the practice known as "erizeni"). As the result, "erizeni" caused confusion in the nation's coin circulation. As the inflow of coins from Ming China disrupted in the latter half of the Japanese economy during the 16th century, rice, gold and silver served as a medium of exchange and evaluating monetary value.

During the Tokugawa period, the Japanese rice-based feudal economy grew significantly as a stronger emphasis on agricultural production led to greater economic output. In addition, Japan's commerce and manufacturing industries began to expand which led to an increasingly influential merchant business elite, handling and distributing goods and services and enabling them to pursue new opportunities for creating businesses. The growth of the merchant class also fueled the growth of early modern Japanese cities. Villages, which operated as largely independent units, also expanded with economic activity gradually shifting from subsistence farming to a more sophisticated commercial agricultural based and relatively advanced technology greatly improved the quality of domestic Japanese made handicrafts such as silk production, textile weaving, and sake brewing.

=== Korea ===
In ancient East Asia, Korea served as a cultural and economic bridge between China and Japan. Ancient Korea maintained close cultural, economic and political ties the various succeeding Chinese dynasties, although there were significant periods of conflict between the two areas. China was also Korea's maritime partner, having a long history dating back thousands of years when ancient Korea commenced trade with ancient China through the Shandong Province through the Yellow Sea route. Its archipelago neighbor Japan was another ancient East Asian trading partner that was also involved in Korean economic and cultural exchange.

Korea did not begin to use money until the Goryeo period when coins began to flow in during China's Song dynasty (960–1279 AD) were imported and began to circulate. Tribute was paid to Song China and China exported silk, books, spices, glasses, incense, precious stones and textiles, tea, medicine, and ceramics while Goryeo exported gold, silver, copper, ginseng, porcelain, pine nuts, and hanji paper back to the Chinese. The economy of ancient Gojoseon prospered due to improvements in agricultural technology (as iron tools were introduced from China) coupled with an abundance of natural resources like gold, silver, copper, tin, and zinc during the second half of the first millennium CE.

Earlier Korean currencies was based on bartering as a means of exchanging goods and services. Fundamental commodities such as grain, rice, and cloth were used and later knives were introduced with settlers coming in from China during the Warring States Period (475 BC – 221 BC) based on archaeological evidence excavated at sites in the Pyongan and Cholla provinces. The Chinese also introduced coins to Korea when the Han dynasty invaded the north at the end of the 2nd century BCE. These coins became the official currency and were known as wuzhu in Chinese or oshuchon in Korean, meaning 'five-grain'. The oshuchon continued to be used by the two kingdoms of Goguryeo and Silla up to the 10th century CE. Modern archaeological evidence points out that they are commonly found in the tombs of the Nangnang (Lelang) region. During the Three Kingdoms period, the demand for coins increased as the Korean economy became more advanced and external trade expanded. Baekje was a great maritime power; its nautical skill, which made it the Phoenicia of East Asia, was instrumental in the dissemination of Buddhism throughout East Asia and continental culture to Japan.

Korea experienced a golden age during the King Sejong period of the Joseon Dynasty. In the 1400s, Korea had the highest standard of living in East Asia due to improvements in agricultural production. Despite the high standard of living, society was burdened by feudalism as peasants made up 80% of the entire population and excessive authoritative government administration that existed in medieval Japan and Europe. Highly educated Yangbans entered government as influential scholars during the Joseon dynasty. A class of wealthy landowners and a scholar-gentry emerged, similar to a social structure that in China were the leading social class in Joseon society. Moreover, Confucianism was utilized as a blueprint for organizing Joseon society in which private business remained under government influence inhibiting economic growth as the Confucian social hierarchy placed merchants at the bottom under scholars, farmers, craftsmen, and technicians even though successful merchants may have enjoyed great wealth and craftsmen and technicians led middle class lifestyles.

The Joseon government also subsidized the agricultural industry and land reclamation projects to increase food production – the growing of rice, barley, buckwheat, beans, ginseng, cotton and potatoes. Accompanying the agriculturally based prosperity came with the increased use of irrigation and a modern monetary economy was beginning to emerge. From the late sixteenth to the early seventeenth century, invasions from Japan and China wiped out the command system and forced Joseon Korea to transition to a market economy. Markets premature very slowly and grain markets in agricultural regions of Joseon Korea were less integrated compared to early modern China and Japan.

The Joseon bureaucracy was tarnished entirely and began started to receive taxes in commodity money — rice and cotton textiles — and eventually began to mint copper coins and lifted trade restrictions. One famous international trade port during the Joseon era was Pyongnam, where medieval Korean merchants offered brocades, jewelries, ginseng, silk, and porcelain, which were renowned worldwide. In the 17th century, relatively advanced technology brought improvements to domestic Korean made handicrafts as privately operated handicraft factories replaced government operated factories which spearheaded the production of more advanced and higher quality goods and services for sale. The increase in mercantile activities contributed to the rise of commercial farming, which transformed rural Joseon life. Coin currency circulated bridging the gap between rural life and the city economies.

By the eighteenth and nineteenth centuries, rice productivity declined in addition to deforestation and natural disasters contributed to the slowdown of the Joseon economy. Grain storage became a target for corrupt politicians and tax exemptions ceased to exist to agricultural production from 1860 onward. Korea under the late Joseon dynasty was seen predatory and rent-seeking, as it was marred by rampant political corruption that led to the decline of the Joseon dynasty which created a power vacuum that drew the Qing dynasty and Japan to compete for influence over the Korean peninsula. Corvee obligations, excessive taxation, landlord exploitation, and peasant oppression contributed to Joseon Korea's gradual economic decline. The relative decline of Qing China coupled with a modern and industrialized Japan gave the Japanese to flex its newly modernized political and military muscles to occupy and colonize the Korean peninsula, a quest Japan had been trying to do for centuries. By the late 19th century, the Joseon dynasty was unable to keep up with the rapid industrialization of the Western World and Japan as it was eventually absorbed into the Chinese Qing dynasty's tributary system. In 1910, Japan annexed Korea due to the decline of the Qing dynasty, and remained under Japanese control until its defeat by the Allied Powers during World War II.

=== Taiwan ===
The recordkeeping and development of the economic history of Taiwan started during the Age of Discovery. In the 17th century, European colonialists realized that the island nation Taiwan was located on the strategic cusp between the East and Southeast Asia. Two main European colonial empires that competed to colonize it were the Dutch and Spanish. In addition, Taiwan also became an intermediate destination for as a trading post between the Chinese Ming and Qing dynasties, Tokugawa Japan, and the indigenous Taiwanese aborigines. Goods such as agate, sugar cane, raw spices, sulfur, dried fish, porcelain, herbal medicine, satin, rice paddies, cloth, salt, copper, venison and buckskin were traded between the Taiwanese aborigines and the European colonial empires and the East Asian states. The Dutch would later colonize Southern Taiwan in 1624 and later spread its influence to the North in Keelung and Tamsui in order to trade with the Ming dynasty. The Dutch would collect the commodities and monopolize the export trade. By 1658, the company exported sugar to Persia, Japan, and Jakarta and had about 35 trading posts in Asia. Tayoan gained 25.6% profit, ranked second out of all of the Dutch trading posts, after Nagasaki, Japan. However, the profit was distributed to shareholders of the company, and not the local Taiwanese.

In 1662, the Ming general Cheng Cheng-Kung and his troops fled to Taiwan after being defeated by the Qing dynasty and drove away the Dutch. After his successful siege of Ft Zeelandia, he had accomplished this but his rule caused the Qing to revive the sea bans and cut off maritime trade in a bid to weaken him. His dynasty ruled Taiwan as the independent kingdom of Tungning, establishing land distribution systems in order to efficiently supply food for their army. The British Empire and Tokugawa Japan continued to trade with Taiwan as an independent state. The English East India Company even established a commercial treaty with the Kingdom of Tungning, which was also known as the Kingdom of Taiwan. During the Cheng period, Taiwan continued to operate as a major international trading post as it continued trade with various foreign countries. A strict ban on Han Chinese immigration from the coastal cities of China was instituted by the Kingdom of Cheng and Taiwan was transformed into an autocratic system resulted a long period of economic stagnation as its prominence as a global trading post regressed. After defeating Koxinga's private army, the Qing government had no interest in improving the economy of Taiwan, calling it an uncivilized land (huawai zhi di).

Thus, economic activities mostly came from the settlements of Han Chinese immigrants. The most significant economic development during this time period was Taiwan's exclusive trade with China, mainly merchants from Fujian and the establishment of irrigation systems and hydraulic engineering projects. Exports included rice, sugar, jute, rattan, and camphor wood while goods such as cotton fabric, cloth, silk, paper, agricultural equipment, wine and porcelain were imported. Commercial activities continued throughout major trading ports. Tainan, Lukang, and Banka became the three largest cities in Taiwan. After 1860, Tamsui and Anping were opened to the Europeans under the Peking Treaty between the Qing dynasty and the British Empire. The Europeans came to trade with Taiwan and Taiwan began to reintegrate itself in the global economy.

The openness of trade reduced the importance of China as Taiwan's trading partner and Taiwan's rice exports would lose its competitiveness to Southeast Asian rice exports. Despite high profits, trading was speculative and high risk resulting many businesses to go bankrupt. Old-fashioned Chinese business management systems would unable to compete with the modern Western management system. Taiwanese merchants soon learn European management practices and began to start their own businesses. Taiwanese merchants were learn the practices so proficiently and adeptly, they soon began to excel over the European trading houses. By the end of the 19th century, Taiwanese merchants dominated Taiwan's import-export trade and accumulated large sums of profits through commercial relations with China, England, and the Netherlands. Some merchant families such as the Lin Pun-Yuan family who traded domestically and internationally even established their own local banks and money exchange houses to lend money to local producers. In 1881, 90 percent of Taiwanese tea was exported by Taiwanese merchants and they also dominated the camphor and sugar, as well as the opium and textile trade. As a result, Taiwan began experiencing a commercial revolution prior to Japanese occupation in 1895.

Japanese capital flooded into Taiwan and large Japanese-owned firms would overshadow the Taiwanese firms paving the way for Taiwan to achieve full-blown capitalism. As a result, Japanese colonial intentions were made to modernize the island's economy, industry, and public works rather than exploitation, subjugation and oppression. New and advanced ideas, concepts, inputs and values were introduced to the Taiwanese from the Japanese through its own process of modern industrialization. Taiwan would soon modernize its infrastructure through several public works projects such by establishing railway and shipping lines, telegraph and telephone systems, shipyards, and public education to prepare the country for further development. Small and medium-sized Taiwanese manufacturing companies flourished as some 310,000 to 410,000 Taiwanese farms and landlords grew and sold paddy rice along with some 3300 local Taiwanese firms serving as refined millers.

Despite previous domination of the import-export trade by native Taiwanese merchants, the production, distribution, and the import-export trade was almost entirely under control by the Japanese as new developments of modern capitalism began to take root in Taiwan. From the early to mid-twentieth century, Taiwan was predominantly an agricultural economy despite its lack of arable land located in a subtropical zone prone to plant diseases and bugs that did not make the island conducive for agriculture. To cope with Taiwan's natural disadvantages, Japan began investing in intensive research and development and established rural institutions to create new methods of agricultural cultivation such as modern irrigation systems, newer and improved breeds of plants and crops that resisted changes in weather patterns, diseases, and bugs. Through modern irrigation and agricultural cultivation techniques, Taiwan would soon become the advanced rice producing country in East Asia between 1930s to the 1950s. In 1940, Taiwan produced more than 50 times its fair share of rice in terms of total proportion and 3.3 times its share in the total world population at that time. Taiwan was a formidable agricultural exporting economy exporting a myriad of crops in large quantities.

As the 1930s loomed, Taiwan began to lose its competitive edge as an agricultural output reached its limit: The arable land was exhausted and reached their ceilings. The lack of resources and rapid militarization and industrialization of Japan forced Taiwan to readjust its economic structure. From 1937 on wards, Taiwan began to place a heavy emphasis on industrial manufacturing, primarily military supplies and equipment (including metal processing and refinery, machinery, weapons, airplanes, and automobiles), petroleum, chemicals, and pharmaceuticals. Light industries such as light bulbs, glass, inks, pencils, porcelain, radios, leather, nail, and agricultural machinery was also developed for war-time self-sufficiency. By 1939, Taiwan's industrial manufacturing output exceeded its agricultural output for the first time in its economic history, a trend that would continue after the war until the 1960s. As a result of Japanese colonialism, Taiwan was able to produce a variety of different agricultural products in numerous quantities along with advanced pre-war transportation, communication, and educational pieces of infrastructure to help develop industry in Taiwan massively and efficiently.

When World War II ended in 1945, the amount of damage done to Taiwan was minimal and its agricultural sector was highly advanced. Due to the Chinese Civil War that led Chiang Kai-Shek to retreat to Taiwan from mainland China to escape Mao Zedong and the Communists, 2 million Chinese refugees and soldiers flooded the island inducing widespread poverty and chaos. Fortunately, pre-war development of Taiwan's agricultural sector allowed the Taiwanese economy to sustain itself despite the upsurge in the number of refugees. With Taiwan's prewar industrialization being well set, most of Taiwan's modern industries began to burgeon with a wide range of light and heavy industries that would propel the resource-poor island for further modernization.

== Modern era ==
Until the early 19th century, the economies of East Asia together was larger than today's high-income economies combined measured in purchasing power parity terms. The share of China and East Asia declined significantly up until the 1950s. By the 1960s, East Asia began to make its mark on the world economy when it began growing faster than the high-income economies of the Western World and today their share accounts for one-third of the global output and one-half in PPP terms. The region now accounts for one-third of the global economic output and almost half of the recent global economic growth. With the affluence and wealth in East Asia, East Asia sees modern science and technology as a major imperative for economic advancement. East Asians value education in these fields more than the liberal arts, social sciences, and humanities. In addition, China and Japan are now investing billions of dollars into their universities and research institutes to create more cutting edge goods and services.

Present growth in East Asia has now shifted to mainland China. As of 2019, Japan, South Korea, Taiwan, and Hong Kong are the four East Asian countries and regions that are considered developed markets by most economic indexes, and Singapore is the sole developed market by all economic indexes in Southeast Asia. Since the end of the 20th century, Japan's role as the principal economic power in the region has shifted to the Four Asian Tiger economies and more recently, China, which became world's second largest economy in 2010. Furthermore, a 2012 report by The Economist noted that South Korea is expected to overtake Japan in terms of GDP per person at power purchasing parity by 2017, a feat already accomplished by Macau (2010), Taiwan (2010), Hong Kong (1997), and Singapore (1993).

The World Bank's April 2024 update indicates a slowdown in East Asia's overall growth rate, decreasing to 4.5% in 2024 from 5.1% in 2023, with China's growth also declining to 4.5% from 5.2%. This cooling of economic momentum, which reflects a broader regional trend including a significant drop in growth for Pacific Island countries to 3.6% from 5.6%, highlights challenges in maintaining the high growth rates that have characterized this region. Additionally, rising corporate debt, which has increased by more than 40 percentage points of GDP since 2010 in China and Vietnam, along with high household debt levels in China, Malaysia, and Thailand, pose financial risks that could dampen consumer spending and investment growth. In response to these economic conditions and to manage comparatively lower inflation rates, East Asian countries have adjusted their fiscal policies to maintain a neutral or positive structural balance and have raised policy interest rates, demonstrating a proactive approach to ensure economic stability.

=== Taiwan ===
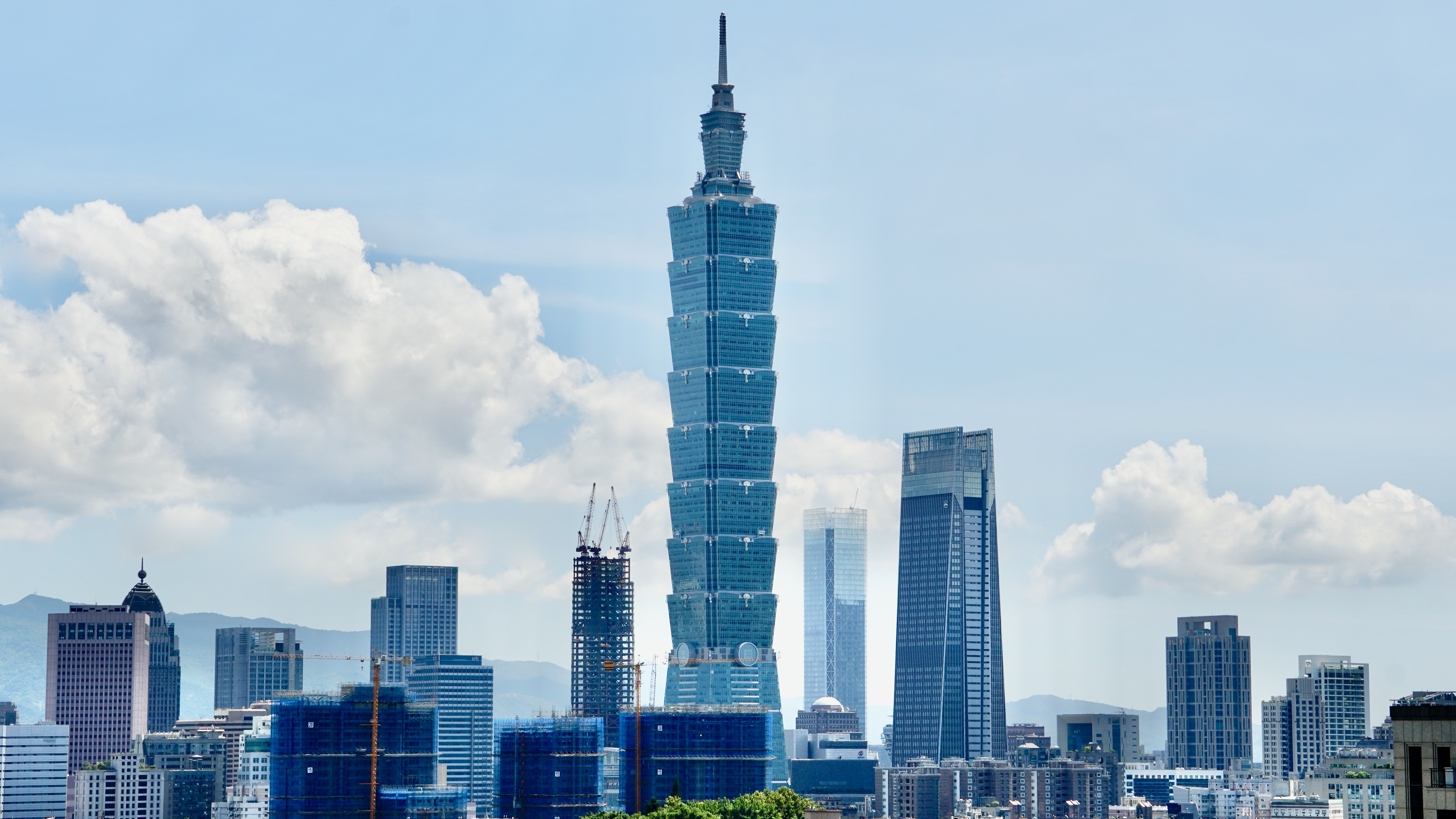
Skyline of Taipei, capital of Taiwan

In 1960, Taiwan was a recipient of foreign aid and had a GDP per capita and human development index comparable among the least developed countries such as Zaire and Congo in the world at that time. Taiwan's rapid prewar development of agriculture and industry induced its rapid postwar economic takeoff. U.S. influence on Kuomintang's economic policies through U.S. Aid Program nurtured Taiwan's small-and-medium-sized businesses through a strong emphasis on free market capitalism and free trade. Japan's post-war economic miracle ironically stimulated the Taiwanese economy leading to postwar technological innovations of product life-cycle commodities that promoted Taiwanese enterprises.

Rapid industrialization and growth during the latter half of the 20th century known as the "Taiwan miracle" transformed Taiwan from an underdeveloped island into one of East Asia's Tiger economies. Taiwan began its industrialization after Hong Kong and before South Korea as a result of rising wage rates in Japan, and subsequently Hong Kong, and quota restrictions imposed by the U.S. and subsequently Europe on textile exports.

In parallel with this economic evolution, Taiwan has also laid down a political transformation that has led the country to more than 30 years of democracy. Taiwan's economic success – by investing in a highly educated workforce, a strong emphasis on scientific and technological advancement, championing private enterprise and honing flexibility of entrepreneurship through private family businesses catapulted the resource poor island to a dynamic and modern high technology powerhouse by the 1980s through the making of many of the world's laptops and everyday consumer electronics. As of 2015, Taiwan has a human development index score that is comparable to France and GDP per capita levels similar to Germany with GDP growth rates averaging 4.5 percent annually.

=== Japan ===
East Asia became an area of early modern economic power starting with the Meiji Restoration in the late 19th century when Japan rapidly transformed itself as the first and only industrial modern economic power in East Asia. From the late nineteenth century to the end of the 1980s, Japan was the dominant economic power in East Asia. In the late 1980s and early 1990s, Japan's GDP was large as the rest of Asia combined. Japan's early industrial economy reached its height in World War II when it expanded its empire and became a major world power. After its defeat and economic collapse after the war, Japan's economy recovered in the 1950s with the post-war economic miracle in which ushered in three decades of unprecedented growth and propelled the country into the world's second-largest economy by the 1980s only to experience an economic slowdown during the 1990s, but Japan nonetheless continues to remain a global economic power.

In 1853, an American fleet led by US Commodore Matthew C. Perry appeared off the Japanese coast. Faced with the threat of invasion, Japan was forced to cast aside global isolation, and opened up to Western trade. Emperor Meiji stressed his zeal for modernization through the development of industry and modern technology by abolishing feudalism in the late 1860s. With a national conviction to not be overtaken by the Western World, Japan launched itself into a drive to industrialize and modernize at a fast pace, established itself as the first modern East Asian power. The Meiji government endeavored to assimilate Western ideas and philosophies, science and technological advances and ways of military warfare integrated with their traditional Japanese philosophies to suit its growing needs for modernization. As the Meiji Era began, the new Japanese national leadership systematically ended feudalism and transformed the archipelago from an underdeveloped feudal samurai state into East Asia's first industrialized nation that closely rivaled the Western colonial powers during the latter half of the nineteenth century.

Economic reforms included a unified modern currency based on the yen, banking, commercial and tax laws, stock exchanges, and a communications network. Establishment of a modern institutional framework conducive to an advanced capitalist economy took time, but was completed by the 1890s. To promote industrialization, the government decided that, while it should help private business to allocate resources and to plan, the private sector was best equipped to stimulate economic growth. The greatest role of government was to help provide the economic conditions in which business could flourish. The Meiji period saw the new government pour its economic resources into industry and modern technology. As the Meiji government emerged as the chief promoter of private enterprise, enacting a series of pro-business policies, it poured venture capital into many private businesses focused on modern technology, but many of these failed to take off and were sold at a loss to bidding businessmen but the power of the great zaibatsu business conglomerates such as Mitsui and Mitsubishi would eventually become global household names.

From the onset, the Meiji rulers embraced the concept of a free market economy and adopted British and North American forms of free market capitalism. Once the initial losses were written off, many of the remaining businesses became profitable. Legal frameworks were established, and export and banking industries soon took hold to funnel venture capital towards financing modern trade and industry. The political judiciousness of the Meiji leaders galvanized Japan's position in the Orient as East Asia's greatest power sustaining a powerful military that defeated the stagnant Chinese Qing dynasty during the First Sino-Japanese War as well as vanquishing imperial rival Russia in 1905, the first major military victory in the modern era of an East Asian power over a European one. In 1910, Japan made territorial acquisitions by annexing Korea and parts of Manchuria establishing itself as a maritime colonial power in East Asia.

Advanced modern high-technology was introduced from the West, thus bringing about improvement to Japan's agriculture and handicrafts. The industrial revolution in Japan first appeared in textiles, including cotton and especially silk, which was based in home workshops in rural areas. By the 1890s, Japanese textiles dominated the domestic market and competed successfully with British products in China and India, as well. Japanese shippers were competing with European traders to carry these goods across Asia and Europe. By improving the quality of textile making equipment to both upgrade the quality and quantity of silk, Japan became the world's largest exporter of silk in 1909. After the first twenty years of the Meiji period, the industrial economy expanded rapidly until about 1920 with inputs of advanced Western technology and large private investments poured into modernizing heavy industry. The Meiji government also modernized its infrastructure by establishing railway and shipping lines, telegraph and telephone systems, shipyards, mines, and inaugurated a land reform program to prepare the country for further development. In addition, Japan also mobilized a highly educated population, where its industrial manufacturing sector grew significantly. Integrating the Western ideal of capitalism into the development of modern science and technology and applying it to private business and military enhancing capabilities catapulted Japan into the forefront of military and economic dynamism by the beginning of the 20th century.

Japan emerged from World War II as a ruined and demoralized country battered into economic submission by the victorious Allies. Foreign occupation by the United States prompted the island nation to make its second opening to the world, adopting Westernization in all aspects by jump-starting a new economy by beginning to set its sights through the export of goods and services to the United States. In addition, the America occupiers stripped the Japanese Emperor of power and laid a newer and modern political framework through the writing of a new constitution and a functioning political system that was conducive to economic growth.

During the American Occupation of Japan, General Douglas MacArthur reformed Japan's economic structure to be self-sufficient by liberalizing the zaibatsu conglomerates. Economic assistance to Japan was also granted in the form of loans where $2 billion in direct economic aid over the span of five years. Japanese politicians, working in tandem with entrepreneurs and corporate executives from industry actively sought to manage and develop the economy. Foreign quality experts such as the acclaimed management consultant Edwards Deming to improve the quality control of Japan's initial export of industrial products to compete match the quality of American factories at the time. In the early days of the post-war economic miracle, Japan would organize their zaibatsu conglomerates that offered lifetime employment as well as seniority pay. Trade unions in the 1950s were very active and collective bargaining was reached through Confucian values of trust and reciprocity through dedication to work with the reward of lifetime employment and job re-training. The quality of Japanese goods began to improve and the international demand for Japanese goods eventually grew.

In the 1960s, Japan's image for pushing poor quality products was very much undeserved but improving nonetheless. Surprisingly, Japanese products competed successfully with its American and European counterparts both in terms of quality and pricing. The island nation also maintained an artificially low currency to increase its exports in order to maintain a competitive edge in the world markets. By the 1980s, Japan's initial image for exporting shoddy and low quality products began to change dramatically. The resale of its cars would begin to spike upwards, its GDP per capita passed that of the United States while propelling the island country into the world's second largest economy. The U.S. government was growing wary of Japan's artificially low currency and would begin force it up but Japan would aggressively cut interest rates which sputtered growth. Despite bubbles culminating with a series of stock and real estate market crashes, the post-war miracle had transformed the island archipelago into the industrialized nation with a thriving middle class that it is today.

=== South Korea ===
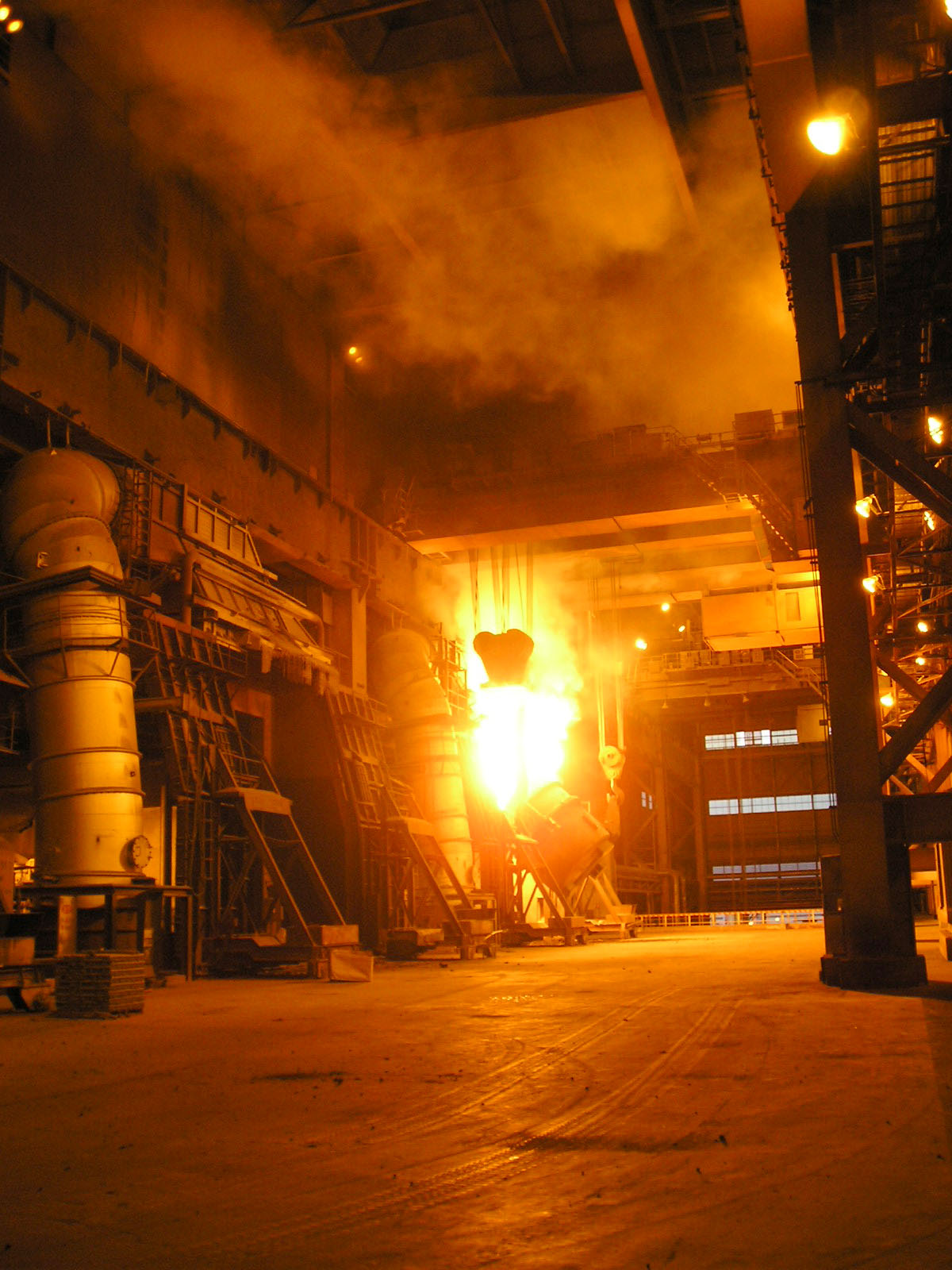
POSCO is one of the largest steel producers in the world. It was established in 1968, under Five-Year Economic and Social Development Plans.

Following the Korean War, South Korea remained one of the poorest countries in the world for over a decade. Marred by poverty, malnutrition, and illiteracy, political chaos, and cultural discourse, South Korea's gross domestic product per capita in 1960 was $79, lower than that of some sub-Saharan African countries. Over the span of one generation, South Korea rapidly transformed itself from a war-torn nation into a G20 economic powerhouse. Since the 1960s, South Korea became one of East Asia's fastest growing economies achieving a rapid increase in its GDP per capita more quickly than any of its neighbors.

The strong emphasis on innovation, benchmarking, economic competitiveness, and industriousness contributed to Korea's rapid economic growth. Within 50 years, the resource-poor peninsula developed into an advanced manufacturing economy with eminent electronic, automobiles, shipbuilding, steel, and petrochemicals industries.

Capital investments in research and development are among the highest in the world relative to its national income. Investments in alternative energy, green technologies, and biotechnology are key in securing the nation's economic prosperity. In addition, South Korea's rigorous education system and the establishment of a highly motivated and educated populace is largely responsible for spurring the country's high technology boom and rapid economic development. South Korea's industrial manufacturing capability has doubled and its export sector has grown rapidly. Its industrial strengths include large numbers of world class brand names of automobiles, electronics, LCD lighting technology, semi-conductors, and shipbuilding.

Having almost no natural resources and always suffering from overpopulation in its small territory, which deterred continued population growth and the formation of a large internal consumer market, South Korea adapted an export-oriented economic strategy to fuel its economy, and in 2014, South Korea was the seventh largest exporter and seventh largest importer in the world. Bank of Korea and Korea Development Institute periodically release major economic indicators and economic trends related to the country's economy.

=== China ===
By the mid- to late 19th century, China began losing its global economic edge as the European colonial powers and Japan were rapidly modernizing and industrializing. A number of factors such as contributed to China's stagnation behind Europe and Japan such as bureaucratic centralization that impeded innovation, creativity, and entrepreneurship, a sense of ethnic and cultural superiority, and preference of civilization continuity and resistance to modern change and technology. After 1750, driven by a modern innovation called the steam engine gave birth to the first Industrial Revolution. In addition, the cutting edge inventions born out of Western European scientific and technological discoveries and advancements propelled the growth of the European colonial powers.

The growth of railways and discovery of electricity took hold in Europe, North America, and its extended European outposts transforming them in modern industrialized societies while China remained unaffected, maintaining a stunted feudal agricultural society. China's failure to modernize resulted economic stagnation and decline leaving it vulnerable for the European colonial powers and Japan to exploit China. In addition, China also lacked the innovative capacity to modernize coupled with war, revolution, and invasions contributed to its economic decline and reduced its productive capabilities. Internal strife, political turmoil and foreign exploitation of China resulted the share of the country's GDP to fall to 5 percent in the 1950s to accounting for one-sixth of the global economy as of 2016 with the Chinese renminbi playing a major role in establishing the modern Chinese economy on a domestic and global scale.

From 1820 to 1950, China experienced a precipitous economic decline that it would not recover until its meteoric rise in 1978 with its per capita GDP income of US$154 in 1978 rising to US$6060 in 2012 while averaging an annual GDP growth rate of 9.3 percent from 1978 to 2003. This growth enhanced China's market forces which made it simpler develop new cutting-edge technologies and introduce consumers to a wide variety of modern goods and services. In 1950, China's per capita GDP was only a fifth of the world's per capita GDP and less than a tenth that of the twelve Western European countries. Since the late 1970s, China has moved forward from a centrally planned economy to a free market capitalist system. China accounts for 71.36% of East Asia's overall GDP.

After 100 years of economic decline up until the late twentieth century until the Deng Xiaoping's reform and opening up, China's GDP grew 10 percent per year from 1978 until 2000 and tripled between 2000 and 2010. China's rise in the global economy catapulted the Middle Kingdom into East Asia's largest economy, overtaking Japan as the world's second largest economy in August 2010. Until 2015, China was the world's fastest-growing major economy, with growth rates averaging 10% over 30 years. Its rapid and sustained economic expansion has lifted hundred of millions of people out of poverty and has made the nation a major engine of economic growth globally. By the end of 2015, China's economy accounted for 51 percent of the total economy in East Asia and commanded 59 percent of East Asia's trade, making China an economic powerhouse for regional growth as well as making the country the largest trading partner of virtually every East Asian country in the region. It is widely expected that around the 2020s, China's economy will surpass the United States and reassert its position as the world's largest economy.

=== Hong Kong and Macau ===
In the early 1960s, the British colony of Hong Kong became the first of the Four Asian Tiger economies by developing strong textile and manufacturing industries and by the 1970s, had solidified itself as a global financial center and was quickly turning into a developed economy. Following in the footsteps of Hong Kong; South Korea, Taiwan, and the city-state of Singapore soon industrialized thanks to capitalist and open policies by their efficient governments.

By 1997, Hong Kong, Taiwan, and South Korea joined Japan as developed economies in East Asia, while Singapore became the sole developed economy in Southeast Asia. Additionally, the economy of Macau, then a Portuguese colony, was also experiencing rapid growth during this period through textile manufacturing and the development of a hospitality and tourism industry, which resulted in high levels of foreign direct investment into the territory. Macau replaced Las Vegas as the world's largest gambling center in 2007.

== Policy ==
Among the major policy choices commonly adopted in East Asia, and noticeably less so elsewhere in the developing world are openness to foreign trade, significant levels of government savings and an emphasis on education for both boys and girls. While these attributes were far from universally applied, they are conspicuously present in the region to a much larger degree than is the case elsewhere.

== See also ==
- 1997 Asian financial crisis
- Economic integration
- Economy of Hong Kong
- Economy of Japan
- Economy of Macau
- Economy of China
- Economy of Mongolia
- Economy of North Korea
- Economy of South Korea
- Economy of Taiwan
