= Loir-et-Cher's 2nd constituency =

Constituency of the National Assembly of France

2nd constituency of Loir-et-Cher
- inline Constituency of the National Assembly of France

- Constituency in Loir-et-Cher

- Location of Loir-et-Cher in France
- Deputy: Roger Chudeau; RN
- Department: Loir-et-Cher

The 2nd constituency of Loir-et-Cher is one of three French legislative constituencies in the Loir-et-Cher department, in the Centre-Val de Loire region.

It consists of the (pre-2015 cantonal re-organisation) cantons of Bracieux, Lamotte-Beuvron, Mennetou-sur-Cher, Neung-sur-Beuvron, Romorantin-Lanthenay (North and South), Saint-Aignan, Salbris, and Selles-sur-Cher.

== Deputies ==
Election	Member	Party
1988	Jeanny Lorgeoux	PS
1993	Patrice Martin-Lalande	RPR
1997	Patrice Martin-Lalande	RPR
2002	Patrice Martin-Lalande	UMP
2007	Patrice Martin-Lalande	UMP
2012	Patrice Martin-Lalande	UMP
2017	Guillaume Peltier	LR
2022	Guillaume Peltier	R!
2022	Roger Chudeau	RN
2024	Roger Chudeau	RN

== Election results ==
=== 2024 ===
Candidate	Party	Alliance	First round			Second round		
Candidate	Party	Alliance	Votes	%	+/–	Votes	%	+/–
Roger Chudeau	RN		25,611	49.72	+25.68	27,192	52.25	+1.18
Nils Aucante	DIV		10,340	20.07	new	24,855	47.75	new
Sylvie Mayer	PCF	NFP	10,027	19.47	+2.50			
Alexandre Guillemaud	UDI	Ensemble	2,803	5.44	-14.84			
Hervé Lancelot	REC		1,719	3.34	-10.65			
Caroline Maidon	LO		966	1.88	+0.58			
Bénédicte de Saint Pierre	DIV		46	0.09	new			
Eric Fouque	DIV		0	0.00	new			
Votes			51,516	100.00		52,047	100.00	
Valid votes			51,516	95.23	-2.27	52,047	95.17	+3.61
Blank votes			1,903	3.52	+1.76	1,909	3.49	-2.93
Null votes			676	1.25	+0.52	732	1.34	+0.88
Turnout			54,095	67.38	+16.97	54,688	68.11	+19.84
Abstentions			26,185	32.62	-16.91	25,604	31.89	-19.84
Registered voters			80,280			80,292		
Result			RN HOLD					

=== 2022 ===
Legislative Election 2022: Loir-et-Cher's 2nd constituency
Party	Candidate	Votes	%	±%
RN	Roger Chudeau	9,493	24.04	+6.11
MoDem (Ensemble)	Emmanuelle Chaplault	8,009	20.28	-8.50
LR (UDC)	Pascal Bioulac	6,824	17.28	−11.80
PCF (NUPÉS)	Jérémie Demaline	6,703	16.97	−1.67
REC	Guillaume Peltier	5,523	13.99	N/A
LMR	Marie-Thérèse Druesne	860	2.18	N/A
DVE	Patrick Pinson	800	2.03	N/A
Others	N/A	1,279	-	−
Turnout		39,491	50.47	−2.74
2nd round result
RN	Roger Chudeau	18,107	51.07	N/A
Ensemble ([[{{{side}}}|{{{side}}}]])	Emmanuelle Chaplault	17,347	48.93	+2.86
Turnout		35,454	48.27	−0.32
RN gain from LR				

=== 2017 ===
Candidate	Label	First round		Second round	
Candidate	Label	Votes	%	Votes	%
Guillaume Peltier	LR	12,170	29.08	19,108	53.93
Jean-Luc Brault	REM	12,043	28.78	16,324	46.07
Mathilde Paris	FN	7,505	17.93		
Yvon Chéry	FI	4,125	9.86		
Didier Guénin	PS	2,072	4.95		
Olivia Marchal	DVD	1,078	2.58		
Marie Robin	ECO	891	2.13		
Jean-Claude Delanoue	PCF	713	1.70		
Marilyne Corbeau	DLF	611	1.46		
Sarah Laurent	ECO	280	0.67		
Francesca Di Pietro	EXG	203	0.49		
Grégory Houssin	DIV	155	0.37		
Votes		41,846	100.00	35,432	100.00
Valid votes		41,846	97.89	35,432	90.77
Blank votes		624	1.46	2,581	6.61
Null votes		276	0.65	1,021	2.62
Turnout		42,746	53.21	39,034	48.59
Abstentions		37,592	46.79	41,306	51.41
Registered voters		80,338		80,340	
Source: Ministry of the Interior

=== 2012 ===
2012 legislative election in Loir-Et-Cher's 2nd constituency
Candidate	Party	First round		Second round	
Candidate	Party	Votes	%	Votes	%
Patrice Martin-Lalande	UMP	17,627	36.84%	24,860	53.16%
Tania Andre	PS	15,631	32.67%	21,905	46.84%
Tatiana Gabillas	FN	9,080	18.98%		
Bernadette Lemenager	FG	2,006	4.19%		
Louis De Redon	MoDem	1,124	2.35%		
Sylvaine Lavaud-Ravion	EELV	1,037	2.17%		
Marilyne Hariti	DLR	412	0.86%		
Flavia Verri		406	0.85%		
Jean-Luc Couppe	AEI	278	0.58%		
Dominique Aubrun	LO	216	0.45%		
François Dubois		35	0.07%		
Valid votes		47,852	98.45%	46,765	96.67%
Spoilt and null votes		755	1.55%	1,613	3.33%
Votes cast / turnout		48,607	60.54%	48,378	60.18%
Abstentions		31,680	39.46%	32,008	39.82%
Registered voters		80,287	100.00%	80,386	100.00%

=== 2007 ===
Legislative Election 2007: Loir-et-Cher's 2nd constituency
Party	Candidate	Votes	%	±%
UMP	Patrice Martin-Lalande	22,643	45.34	+2.44
PS	Jeanny Lorgeoux	14,375	28.79	−3.16
MoDem	Jean-Pierre Albertini	4,161	8.33	N/A
FN	Alain Retsin	2,544	5.09	−6.96
PCF	Jean-Claude Delanoue	1,179	2.36	−1.54
LV	Philippe Gauthier	1,084	2.17	N/A
Others	N/A	3,952	7.92	+1.28
Turnout		50,835	63.48	−3.90
Registered electors		80,085		
2nd round result
UMP	Patrice Martin-Lalande	26,735	55.15	−1.69
PS	Jeanny Lorgeoux	21,745	44.85	+1.69
Turnout		49,998	62.43	−1.10
Registered electors		80,085		
UMP hold				

=== 2002 ===
Legislative Election 2002: Loir-et-Cher's 2nd constituency
Party	Candidate	Votes	%	±%
UMP	Patrice Martin-Lalande	21,786	42.90	+6.89
PS	Jeanny Lorgeoux	16,226	31.95	−2.47
FN	Paul Pelletier	6,117	12.05	−3.03
PCF	Yvon Chery	1,981	3.90	−4.85
CPNT	Pierre Moreau	1,301	2.56	N/A
Others	N/A	3,368	6.64	−
Turnout		51,833	67.38	−4.15
Registered electors		76,928		
2nd round result
UMP	Patrice Martin-Lalande	26,767	56.84	+6.71
PS	Jeanny Lorgeoux	20,324	43.16	−6.71
Turnout		48,872	63.53	−12.14
Registered electors		76,927		
UMP hold				

=== 1997 ===
Legislative Election 1997: Loir-et-Cher's 2nd constituency
Party	Candidate	Votes	%	±%
RPR	Patrice Martin-Lalande	18,005	36.01	−8.92
PS	Jeanny Lorgeoux	17,207	34.42	+9.54
FN	Paul Pelletier	7,540	15.08	+2.67
PCF	Sylvie Hemme	4,376	8.75	−0.09
GE	Cédric Daub	1,499	3.00	−2.38
MEI	Etienne Bourgeois	1,367	2.73	N/A
Turnout		52,849	71.53	−2.11
Registered electors		73,885		
2nd round result
RPR	Patrice Martin-Lalande	26,445	50.13	−7.67
PS	Jeanny Lorgeoux	26,313	49.87	+7.67
Turnout		55,911	75.67	+1.30
Registered electors		73,885		
RPR hold				

=== 1993 ===
Legislative Election 1993: Loir-et-Cher's 2nd constituency
Party	Candidate	Votes	%	±%
RPR	Patrice Martin-Lalande	22,133	44.93	
PS	Jeanny Lorgeoux	12,257	24.88	
FN	Robert Binet	6,113	12.41	
PCF	Jean-Claude Delanoue	4,354	8.84	
GE	Roger Doire	2,649	5.38	
NERNA	Eric Talles	1,76	3.56	
Turnout		54,237	73.64	
Registered electors		73,648		
2nd round result
RPR	Patrice Martin-Lalande	29,612	57.80	
PS	Jeanny Lorgeoux	21,616	42.20	
Turnout		54,769	74.37	
Registered electors		73,646		
RPR gain from PS				
