= Patrice Martin-Lalande =

French politician

Patrice Martin-Lalonde
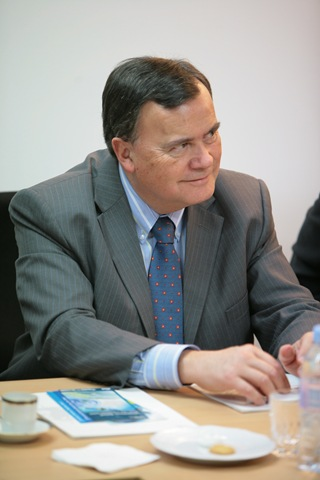
- Patrice Martin-Lalande
- Parliamentary group: RPR, then UMP

Deputy for Loir-et-Cher's 2nd constituency in the National Assembly of France
- In office 1993 – 20 June 2017
- Preceded by: Jeanny Lorgeoux
- Succeeded by: Guillaume Peltier

Personal details
- Born: December 2, 1947 (age 78)

Patrice Martin-Lalande (born December 2, 1947) was a member of the National Assembly of France from 1993 to 2017. He represented Loir-et-Cher's 2nd constituency, as a member of Rally for the Republic, then the Union for a Popular Movement.
