= National champions =

Type of corporation

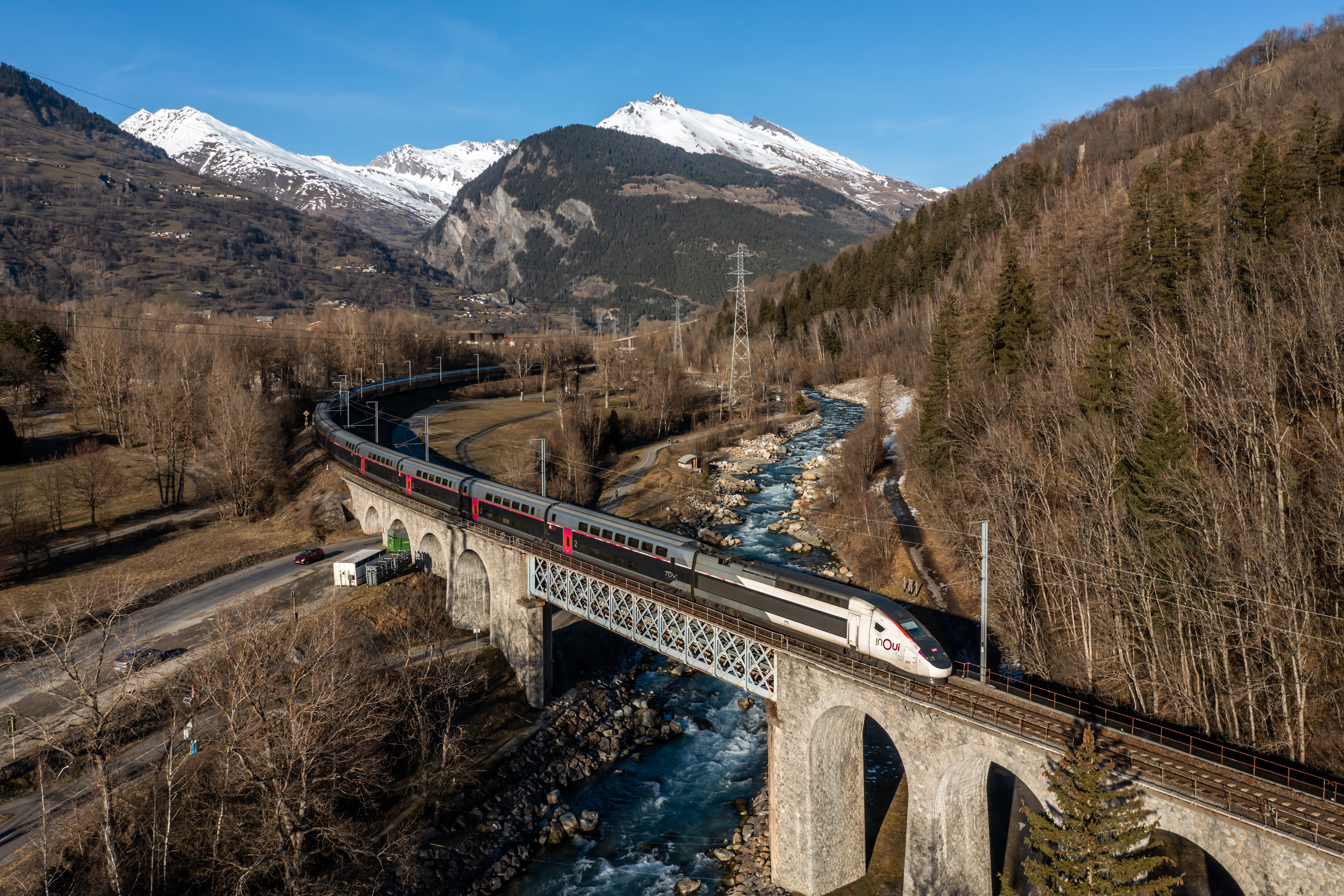
France's high-speed TGV was developed by the state-owned SNCF, a national champion, which was used to heavily reshape the French national railway network in the second half of the 20th century. In 1981, President François Mitterrand hailed "the contribution of a public service to the economic progress of the nation".

National champions are corporations which are technically private businesses but due to governmental policy are ceded a dominant position in a national economy. In this system, these large organizations are expected not only to seek profit but also to "advance the interests of the nation"; the government sets policies which favor these organizations. The policy is practiced by many governments, in some sectors more than others (such as defense), but by giving an unfair advantage against market competition, the policy promotes economic nationalism domestically and global pre-eminence abroad contrary to the free market. The policy also deters or prevents venture capitalism.

As the policy is the collective form of inequality of opportunity, it is irreconcilable with the paradigm of the neo-liberal (or "laissez-faire") economy. It was a major part of the dirigiste policy of 1945–1975 France.

== Definition ==
Under a national champion policy, governments expect one domestic corporation or an oligopoly of such corporations, typically in strategic sectors (whether private or state-sponsored) to seek profit and to "advance the interests of the nation". The policy is practised or acquiesced to by every country in certain sectors (typically national defence and security and the printing of banknotes and often in the philanthropic, performing or subsidizing research and development of new technologies and through those National Institutes which produce marketable innovations). By allowing corporations a real or perceived monopoly due to the amalgamation of enterprises and the active or supportive suppression of domestic and foreign-based market competition, the policy over time operates as a form of economic nationalism as it is contrary to the free market and enhanced innovation.

As the policy is a form of enforced inequality of opportunity, it is irreconcilable with the paradigm of the liberal economy advocated by 18th century economist Adam Smith, considered to be the intellectual father of modern capitalism.

== European national champions ==
Academics often cite post-World War II Gaullist dirigisme in France as the pinnacle of the national champion policy. Other examples include the creation of the British Steel Corporation by the United Kingdom which acquired the country's largest 14 domestic steel companies in 1967. The prototypical British example was the establishment of Imperial Chemical Industries (ICI) in 1926, formed from the merger of four companies with the support of the British government: in the 1960s this policy was pursued further in the UK, in order to concentrate capital and create firms which could make the large capital investments and establish the large scale production required to exploit economies of scale and scope, with other examples including the General Electric Company (GEC) and British Leyland. The policy was abandoned by the government of Margaret Thatcher at the end of the 1970s, shifting instead to a more laissez-faire strategy aimed at maximising foreign investment. By 2005 all of Britain's "national champions" had come under foreign ownership, with the exceptions of the aerospace (BAE Systems and Rolls-Royce Holdings) and pharmaceutical (GlaxoSmithKline and AstraZeneca) sectors.

The risk involved with such policies is exemplified by the unsuccessful challenges to IBM's period of dominance of the innovative computer market by UK's ICL, France's Bull, and Italy's Olivetti during the 1970s. Successful and rewarding challenges however are shown to be possible in recent years, as exemplified by European aircraft champion Airbus, and Chinese train champion CRRC.

== Chinese national champions ==
The state-owned national champions received high levels of protection, state financial support, political advice and governmental support for operating in foreign environments, and special rights of management autonomy, profit retention, and investment decisions. State-owned national champions in nonfinancial strategic sectors like energy, civil aviation, infrastructure, and strategic minerals are overseen by the State-Owned Assets Supervision and Administration Commission of the State Council (SASAC). The Chinese government also brokers partnerships between foreign investors and China's national champions. In addition to CRRC, notable examples of Chinese national champions include Huawei, Bank of China, and Sinopec.

The beginning of China's efforts to develop national champions were the State Council's early 1980s creation of "general companies," which were large multi-region corporations under the supervision of China's central ministries. These efforts gained further momentum during the piloting of state-owned industry groups and the tenure of Jiang Zemin.

In support of Jiang's aggressive promotion of overseas foreign direct investment as part of going out, China's State Council assembled a team of 120 state-owned industry groups to be national champions between 1991 and 1997. Developing national champions also became increasingly important as China negotiated to enter the World Trade Organization.

During the tenure of Chinese leader Xi Jinping, China has encouraged mergers in of its state-owned enterprises, motivated by a desire to create larger and more competitive national champions with a bigger global market share by reducing price competition among SOEs abroad and increasing vertical integration. Consistent with China's Belt and Road Initiative, national champions "going out" remain a Chinese government priority.

China has promoted its national champions particularly strongly since 2017, with a focus on national champions in the technology sector. In 2018, China designated Baidu, Alibaba, iFlytek, Tencent, and SenseTime as "AI champions".

=== Commentary ===
Academic Chen Li writes that institutional adaptation in China's state sector extends to the late 1950s, and that since the 1990s, "continuous learning, experimentation, and adaptation of CPC central bureaucracy ... has not only brought about the rise of China's 'national champions' in finance, but also sustained critical support for the entire 'national team'."

== Russian renewal ==
The policy is evident variously in the 21st century: Russia is its maximal exponent among the world's G-20. Other examples are the merger of E.ON with Ruhrgas backed by the German government in 2000 or the merger of GDF with Suez backed by the French government in 2008.

Russian President Vladimir Putin has made "national champions" a central axis of his policy. The concept was introduced by Putin in his 1997 dissertation "Strategic Planning of the Reproduction of the Resource Bases". Putin, in turn, may have gotten the idea from a textbook by University of Pittsburgh analysts William King and David Cleland. Putin later expanded on the subject in an article published in 1999 in the Journal of the St. Petersburg Mining Institute.

Charles de Gaulle had also advocated similar ideas when he was the president of France in the 1950s.

=== Vertical integration ===
In his dissertation, Putin wrote: "The process of restructuring the national economy must have the goal of creating the most effective and competitive companies on both the domestic and world markets."

Putin's 1999 article proposes that the state should closely regulate and develop the natural resources sector through creating companies with close links to the power vertical, making the firms big enough to compete with multinationals. These companies would become "national champions", representing the state's interest in international commerce.

Most national champions are likely to be 50% or more owned by the Russian government, but there is no reason why predominantly private companies could not also serve as national champions, given the right guidance and pressure.

=== Advancing national interests ===
Instead of allowing the country's oligarch-controlled corporations to focus exclusively on making profit, Putin proposed that they should be used instead to advance the country's national interests, suggesting that Russia should reclaim some of the assets that were privatized during Yeltsin, and integrate them vertically into industrial conglomerates so they could compete better with Western multinational corporations.

Regardless of who is the legal owner of the country's natural resources and in particular the mineral resources, the state has the right to regulate the process of their development and use. The state should act in the interests of society as a whole and of individual property owners, when their interests come into conflict with each other and when they need the help of state organs of power to reach compromises when their interests conflict.

— Vladimir Putin

One example of the concept is that energy corporations such as Gazprom should keep the prices inside Russia low, as a form of subsidy for the public, and only strive for maximal profit in foreign countries.

== See also ==
- Corporatism
- Flag carrier
- National oil company
- State capitalism
- Nationalization
- East Asian model
- Economic nationalism
- Intellectual property
- Barriers to entry
- Chaebol
- Commanding heights of the economy
