= East Asian model =

Economic system

The East Asian model (Japanese: 修正資本主義, romanized: shūsei shihonshugi, lit. 'modified capitalism'), pioneered by Japan, is a plan for economic growth whereby the government invests in certain sectors of the economy in order to stimulate the growth of specific industries in the private sector. It generally refers to the model of development pursued in East Asian economies such as Japan, South Korea and Taiwan. It has also been used by some to describe the contemporary economic system in Mainland China after Deng Xiaoping's reform and opening up during the late 1970s and the current economic system of Vietnam after its Đổi Mới policy was implemented in 1986. Generally, as a country becomes more developed, the most common employment industry transitions from agriculture to manufacturing, and then to services.

The main shared approach of East Asian economies is the role of the government. East Asian governments have recognized the limitations of markets in the allocation of scarce resources in the economy; thus the governments have used interventions to promote economic development. They include state control of finance, direct support for state-owned enterprises in strategic sectors of the economy or the creation of privately owned national champions, high dependence on the export market for growth, and a high rate of savings. It is similar to dirigisme, neomercantilism, and Hamiltonian economics.

There is no single approach to the Asian economies, and they vary widely in economic structure as well as development experiences among the East Asian economies, especially between Northeast and Southeast Asian countries. Nations such as Malaysia, Indonesia and Thailand have historically relied much more on Foreign Direct Investment (FDI) than Taiwan or Singapore.

== Success of the model ==
East Asian countries saw rapid economic growth from the end of the Second World War until the 1997 Asian financial crisis. For instance, the annual growth between 1970-96 averaged 3-5% in China, Hong Kong, Taiwan, South Korea, and Singapore. During this period, developing East Asian countries grew at three times the growth rate of the world economy. As a result, these countries attracted significant foreign and private capital inflows. During this period, East Asian countries also achieved dramatic reductions in poverty. In Indonesia, the percentage of people living below the official poverty line fell from 60% to 12% between 1970 and 1996. Furthermore, Indonesia's population increased from 117 to 200 million. Between 1980 and 1992, average wages in newly industrialized Asian countries rose by 5% a year, while manufacturing employment rose by 6%. Overall standards of living saw improvements during this growth period in East Asian countries.

== Causes of GDP growth ==
Behind this success were export-oriented economies, which attracted high foreign direct investment and greater technological development, consequently leading to significant GDP growth. Corporations like LG, Hyundai, and Samsung were successful due to government backing and intervention in the banking sector, so banks lent them credit. The governments in those countries helped control trade unions, provisions, and justice and provided the necessary public infrastructure (roads, electricity, education, etc.). All this just attracted foreign investors to these countries. Additionally, Asian countries received foreign aid from the West (especially from the United States as a Cold War Containment policy, in order to discourage communism) and gained better access to the Western markets.

In his assessment of the East Asian Miracle, economist Ajit Singh points out that throughout the 1950s, 60s, and 70s, Japan did not adhere to free-market principles. Instead, Japan pursued policies that involved heavy government intervention in the economy, maintained highly protectionist policies, discouraged foreign direct investment, and remained largely unintegrated with the global economy despite its significant export orientation. This developmental path was also largely mirrored in Taiwan and South Korea.

== Examples ==
"Eight countries in East Asia–Japan, South Korea, Taiwan, Hong Kong, Singapore, Thailand, Malaysia, and Indonesia–have become known as the East Asian miracle." Beside successes of the East Asian economy mentioned above in the success of the model, there are two other examples why they are called 'Asian miracles'.

- Japan: Japan first adopted the East Asian model of capitalism after the Second World War in 1950. After the war and American occupation, the recovered Japan was considered a developing country (e.g., in 1952 Japan had a lower total export value than India). The main development was between 1950 and 1980. It took Japan about 25 years, a non-competitive country (in steel production), to overcome Germany in producing cars (Germany was at that time the largest exporter of automobiles in the world). Five years later, Japan produced more automobiles than the US. In a post-war period, the Korean War (1950-1953) can be seen as a turning point for the Japanese economy, as the country moved from depression to economic recovery. Japan, being occupied by the US military, was a staging place for the US-led United Nations forces deployed in the Korean Peninsula. The country found itself in a good position to make a profit as Japanese goods and services were procured by the UN troops. This, along with economic reform, gave an initial boost to the economy that would experience rapid growth for the next half-century. In the 1950s and early 1960s, average annual growth rates were around 10% and later would even climb to 13%. In the early post-war years Japan initiated economic reform; Zaibatsu corporations were dismantled, empowering small agricultural producers to earn profit as opposed to the pre-war years, when big land lords were owners of agricultural land. In the 1960s, Japan developed a consumer-oriented economy, with industry orienting towards the production of high-quality technological products aimed at export, as well as the domestic market. Japanese exports rose rapidly and in subsequent years it became a world leader in car manufacturing, shipbuilding, precision optical devices, and high technology. Beginning in 1965, Japan started having a trade surplus and the next decade saw Japan having the third-largest gross national product in the world. In the 1970s, growth slowed significantly, partly due to the oil crisis, as the country was heavily dependent on oil and food imports. In the 1980s, Japan diversified its raw material sources, due to economic misfortunes of the previous decade, and shifted its production emphasis towards telecommunication and computer technologies. Even though Japanese economic expansion ended in the early 1990s, today Japan is the leader in highly sophisticated technology along with its traditional heavy industry products. Tokyo is one of the world's most important financial centres, home to the Japan Stock Exchange Group's Tokyo Stock Exchange and Tokyo Commodity Exchange, among others.
- Korea: Korea followed Japan and, despite its lower industrial development, competed in chip manufacturing for nearly 40 years, surpassing the United States. In the 1950s, South Korea was one of the poorest countries in the world, heavily dependent on foreign help, provided mostly by the US. Beginning in the early 1960s, the country’s autocratic leadership initiated economic development reforms that paved the way for rapid economic expansion. Heavy protectionist policies allowed only imports of raw materials, which initiated domestic production of consumer goods. By 1990, average annual growth was around 9%. Family businesses (chaebol) that turned into big conglomerates (i.e., Samsung, Hyundai) had government financial help, for instance, in the form of tax breaks, thus spearheading economic growth. South Korea became a highly industrialised country with a skilled workforce and, along with Taiwan, Singapore and Hong Kong ended up being one of the Four Asian Tigers. However, in the 1990s, economic growth significantly slowed, which resulted in huge financial aid from the International Monetary Fund of 57 billion USD, the IMF’s largest intervention. In the early 21st century, South Korea enjoyed a stable economy, and the country initiated slow liberalisation.

== Ersatz capitalism ==
Ersatz capitalism is Kunio Yoshihara's analysis of Southeast Asian economic development as a sort of 'pseudo-capitalism', referring to governments and businesses pushing their citizens to undertake economic activities that provide their country with comparative advantage. These activities include capital investments and technologically intensive production.

== Crisis ==
Besides many secondary actors in bringing out a crisis (such as a property price bubble, macroeconomic mistakes or a fall in the rate of growth of exports) the core of the crisis was in the East Asian model itself. The over-investment, misallocation of foreign capital inflows (big corporations getting money from each other, whether investment was sufficient or not), and other problems in the financial sector. Another side of the government-controlled market was massive corruption, which was due to a close relationship between government and business. This so-called “crony capitalism” (which means influence of government and businessmen) led to a crisis of confidence in the economies, firstly in Thailand and then other Asian countries, leading to the 1997 Asian financial crisis. Because of the crisis, GDP and exports collapsed. Unemployment & inflation both went up, and as a result of all, this the governments accumulated huge foreign debt.

== Limitations ==
Japan: Japan's ongoing and deepening economic malaise reveals the potential failures of a model Japan pioneered. In an article entitled The "Hidden" Side of the "Flying-Geese" Model of Catch-Up Growth: Japan's Dirigiste Institutional Setup and a Deepening Financial Morass, author Terutomo Ozawa explains that Japan's initial economic success was directly caused by the same factors that have led to its stagnation. Indeed, the country has faced and continues to face three decades of economic stagnation that has led to what has been called the Lost Decades and shows no current signs of ending.

South Korea: Due to government interventions such as directed credits, regulations, and explicit and implicit subsidies, the market lacked discipline, which has contributed to the problem of unproductive or excessive investment that contributed to causing the crisis.

Indonesia: "Trade restriction, import monopolies and regulations have impeded economic efficiency, competitiveness, reduced the quality and productivity of investment.”

Thailand: Political connectivity with the market has led to giving priority to political affairs at the expense of economic decisions. For instance, the implementation of necessary policy measures was delayed due to the general election in November 1996. In this and other cases, special interests have often influenced the allocation of budgetary resources and other public policy actions.

Overall, in a number of countries, there was inadequate disclosure of information and data deficiencies, and direct lending. In general, there has also often been a lack of transparency in policy implementation, for example, decisions with regard to public infrastructure projects and ad hoc tax exemptions.

== See also ==
- American school (economics)
- Autarky
- Corporatism
- Reform and opening up
- Chinese model
- Developmental state
- Dirigisme
- Economic interventionism
- Four Asian Tigers
- Tiger Cub Economies
- Nordic model
- Singapore model
- State capitalism
- Hamiltonian economic program
