= Dirigisme =

Economic doctrine in which the state plays a strong directory role

Dirigisme (French: [diʁiʒism]), or dirigism (from French diriger 'to direct'), refers to an economic system in which the state takes an active and directive role in shaping and guiding the economy, rather than limiting itself to a purely regulatory or hands-off approach within a market economy. As an economic doctrine, dirigisme stands in contrast to laissez-faire, highlighting the constructive role of market intervention in addressing inefficiencies and market failures. Dirigiste policies typically include indicative planning, state-guided investment, and the strategic use of market instruments such as taxes and subsidies to encourage economic actors to align with national development goals. Dirigisme is not synonymous with a state-controlled command economy but a market economy and big public sector is required for dirigisme; hence the public sector becomes an instrument for altering the market.

The term emerged in the post–World War II era to describe the economic policies of France which included substantial state-directed investment, the use of indicative economic planning to supplement the market mechanism and the establishment of state enterprises in strategic domestic sectors. It coincided with both the period of substantial economic and demographic growth, known as the Trente Glorieuses which followed the war, and the slowdown beginning with the 1973 oil crisis.

The term has subsequently been used to classify other economies that pursued similar policies, such as Japan, the East Asian tiger economies of Hong Kong, Singapore, South Korea and Taiwan; the economy of China after the reform and opening up, Indonesia and India after the opening of its economy in 1991. Outcomes associated with dirigisme differ across these cases, with some economies achieving sustained growth and structural transformation, while others recorded more limited or uneven results. Dirigisme is not strictly tied to any single political ideology or philosophy, as variations of dirigiste policy have been implemented under both left and right leaning governments.

According to the heterodox economist Mariana Mazzucato, most modern economies of the world can be characterized as dirigiste to some degree as the state may exercise directive action by performing or subsidizing research and development of new technologies through government procurement (especially military) or through state-run research institutes.

== France ==
Before the Second World War, France had a relatively fragmented capitalist economic system. The many small companies, often family-owned, were often not dynamic and efficient in comparison to the large industrial groups in Germany or the United States. The Second World War laid waste to France. Railroads and industries were destroyed by aerial bombardment and sabotage; industries were seized by Nazi Germany; in the immediate postwar years loomed the spectre of long years of rationing (such as the system enforced in that period in the United Kingdom). Some sections of the French business and political world lost authority after collaborating with the German occupiers.

Post-war French governments, from whichever political side, generally sought rational, efficient economic development, with the long-term goal of matching the highly developed and technologically advanced economy of the United States. The development of French dirigisme coincided with the development of meritocratic technocracy: the École Nationale d'Administration supplied the state with high-level administrators, while leadership positions in industry were staffed with Corps of Mines state engineers and other personnel trained at the École Polytechnique.

During the 1945–1975 period, France experienced unprecedented economic growth (5.1% on average) and a demographic boom, leading to the coinage of the term Trente Glorieuses (the "Glorious Thirty [years]").

Dirigisme flourished under the conservative governments of Charles de Gaulle and Georges Pompidou. In those times, the policy was viewed as a middle way between the American policy of little state involvement and the Soviet policy of total state control. In 1981, Socialist president François Mitterrand was elected, promising greater state enterprise in the economy; his government soon nationalised industries and banks. However, in 1983 the initial bad economic results forced the government to renounce dirigisme and start the era of rigueur ("rigour"). This was primarily due to the Inflation of the French Franc and the Keynesian policies taken by François Mitterrand. Dirigisme has remained out of favour with subsequent governments, though some of its traits remain.

=== Indicative planning ===
The main French tool under dirigisme was indicative planning through plans designed by the Commissariat général du plan ("Commission for the Plan"). Indicative planning used various incentives to induce public and private actors to behave in an optimal fashion, with the plan serving as a general guideline for optimal investment. During this period France never ceased to be a capitalist economy directed by the accumulation of capital, profit-maximizing enterprise and market-based allocation of producer goods.

In contrast to Soviet-type central planning practiced in the former Soviet bloc, where economic planning substituted private profit incentivized investment and operated the factors of production according to a binding plan, the French state never owned more than a minority of industry and did not seek to replace private profit with central planning. The idea of dirigisme is to complement and improve the efficiency of the market through indirect planning intended to provide better information to market participants. This concept is held in contrast to a planned economy, which aims to replace market-based allocation of production and investment with a binding plan of production expressed in units of physical quantities.

=== State ownership ===
Because French industry prior to the Second World War was weak due to fragmentation, the French government encouraged mergers and the formation of "national champions": large industry groups backed by the state.

Two areas where the French government sought greater control were in infrastructure and the transportation system. The French government owned the national railway company SNCF, the national electricity utility EDF, the national natural gas utility GDF, the national airline Air France; phone and postal services were operated as the PTT administration. The government chose to devolve the construction of most autoroutes (freeways) to semi-private companies rather than to administer them itself. Other areas where the French government directly intervened were defence, nuclear and aerospace industries (Aérospatiale).

This development was marked by volontarisme, the belief that difficulties (e.g. postwar devastation, lack of natural resources) could be overcome through willpower and ingenuity. For instance, following the 1973 energy crisis, the saying "In France we don't have oil, but we have ideas" was coined. Volontarisme emphasized modernization, resulting in a variety of ambitious state plans. Examples of this trend include the extensive use of nuclear energy (close to 80% of French electrical consumption), the Minitel, an early online system for the masses, and the TGV, a high-speed rail network.

== India ==
Dirigisme is seen in India after the end of British rule from 1947 with domestic policy tending towards protectionism, a strong emphasis on import substitution industrialisation, economic interventionism, a large government-run public sector, business regulation and central planning. While according to some authors trade and foreign investment policies were relatively liberal. However, in regard to trade and foreign investment, other authors disagree stating that high tariff barriers were maintained, with import duties of 350% not being uncommon, and there was also severe restrictions on the entry of foreign goods, capital, and technology. Although a mixed economy, the share of investment in public sector enterprises was 60%. India's economic policies during this period were more akin to Soviet economic planning rather than the French dirigisme model. Socialist economic planning, was especially prevalent in the form of the Planning Commission, Licence Raj and Five-Year plans. However, India during this period was also not a fully socialist economy with a private sector although heavily regulated.

After liberalisation in 1991, India shifted from a mixed planned led Soviet type model to a more market-oriented dirigisme economy with indicative planning. The 1991 reforms led to formation of pseudo-state owned companies by Government of India such as NSE, NSDL, CRISIL, IL&FS, IDFC etc. which were joint-venture of public sector companies and controlling stake(>25%) owned by PSUs as a protectionist policy to lead the market reforms instead of invisible free-hand of free market. The Indian state has complete control and ownership of railways, ports, highways; majority control and stake in banking, insurance, farming, dairy, fertilizers & chemicals, airports, nuclear, mining, digitization, defense, steel, rare earths, water, electricity, oil and gas industries and power plants, and has substantial control over digitalization, Broadband as national infrastructure, telecommunication, supercomputing, space, port and shipping industries, among other industries, were effectively nationalised in the mid-1950s. In essence, the Indian Government has indirect control on all sectors except technology and consumer goods.

== Other economies with dirigiste characteristics ==
Economic dirigisme has been described as an inherent aspect of fascist economies by Hungarian author Iván T. Berend in his book An Economic History of Twentieth-Century Europe. However, the fascist systems created in Italy, Portugal, Spain, Japan, or Germany were a varied mix of elements from numerous philosophies, including nationalism, authoritarianism, militarism, corporatism, collectivism, totalitarianism, and anti-communism.

Dirigisme has been brought up as a politico-economic scheme at odds with laissez-faire capitalism in the context of French overseas holdings. To varying degrees throughout the post-colonial period, countries such as Lebanon and Syria have been influenced by this motif.

== See also ==
- Colbertism
- Crony capitalism
- Developmental state
- Economic planning
- French Fourth Republic (1946–1958)
- Indicative planning
- Industrial policy
- Mercantilism
- Mixed economy
- State capitalism
- State-owned enterprise
- State-sponsored capitalism

=== Economies with dirigisme or similar policies ===
- American School (1790s–1970s), the American model
- Beijing Consensus, the Chinese model
- Economy of France (1945–1975), often known as Trente Glorieuses
- Economy of Singapore
- Economy of Taiwan
- Four Asian Tigers
- Economy of Indonesia
- German model, the German post-war economic model
- Economy of Japan
  - Japanese economic miracle
- National Policy (1876–1920), the Canadian model
- Economy of South Africa (1948–1994)
