= Guillaume Peltier =

French politician (born 1976)

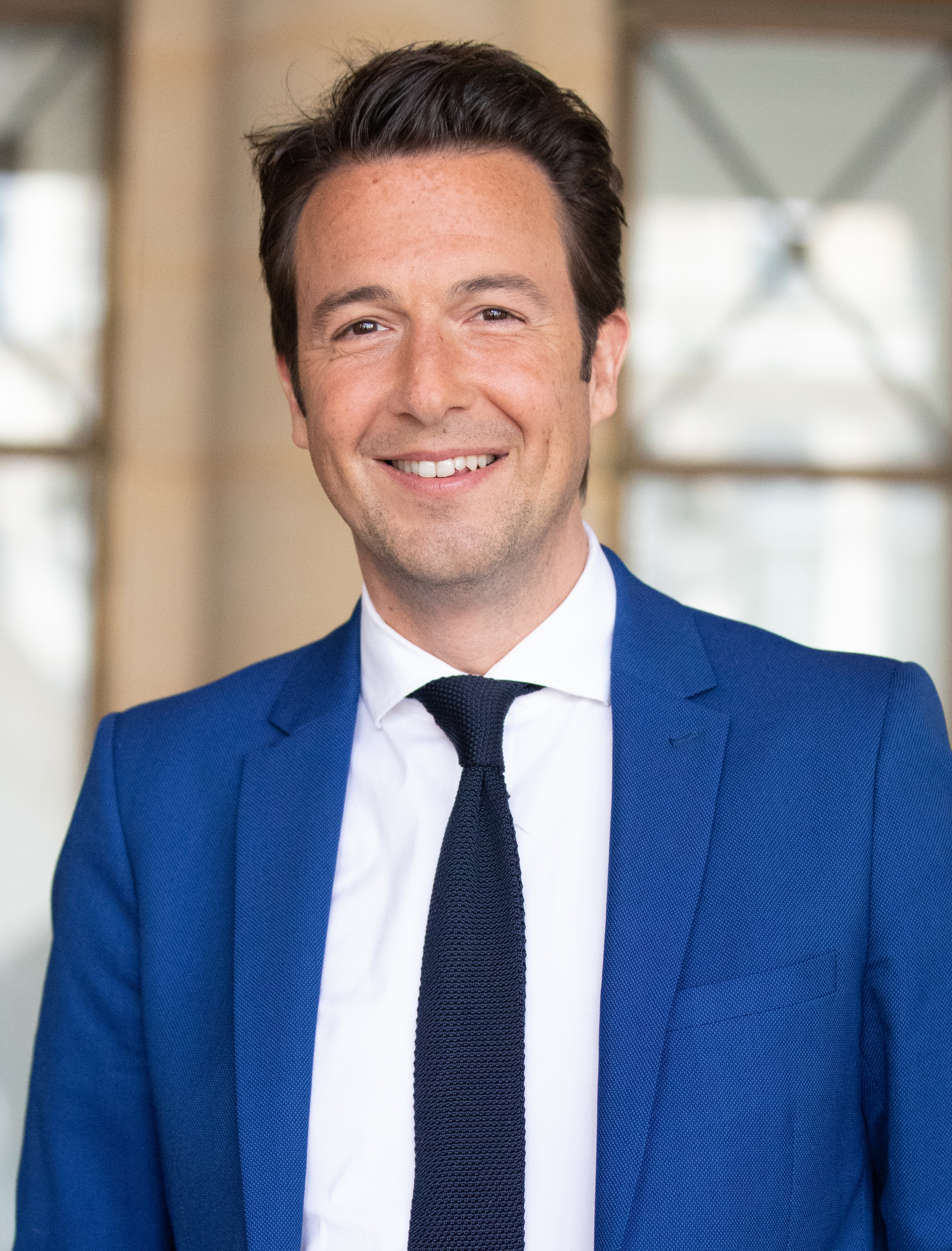
- Peltier in 2022

Member of the European Parliament
- Incumbent
- Assumed office 16 July 2024
- Constituency: France

Member of the National Assembly for Loir-et-Cher's 2nd constituency
- In office 21 June 2017 – 20 June 2022
- Preceded by: Patrice Martin-Lalande
- Succeeded by: Roger Chudeau

Member of the Regional Council of Centre-Val de Loire
- In office 18 December 2015 – 2 July 2021

Mayor of Neung-sur-Beuvron
- In office 30 March 2014 – 13 July 2017
- Preceded by: Michel Legourd
- Succeeded by: Édith Bresson

Personal details
- Born: 27 August 1976 (age 49) Paris, France
- Party: IDL (since 2024)
- Other political affiliations: FN (1996–1998); MNR (1998–2000); MPF (2001–2008); UMP (2009–2015); LR (2015–2022); REC (2022–2024)
- Children: 5
- Education: Lycée Buffon; Lycée Lakanal
- Alma mater: Panthéon-Sorbonne University
- Occupation: Teacher • Politician

Guillaume Peltier (French pronunciation: [ɡijom pɛltje]; born 27 August 1976) is a French politician, former teacher and business leader, who was elected as a Member of the European Parliament (MEP) in 2024. He represented the 2nd constituency of the Loir-et-Cher department in the National Assembly from 2017 to 2022. He has also served in the Departmental Council of Loir-et-Cher for the canton of Chambord since 2021. A former member of The Republicans, Peltier joined Reconquête to support Éric Zemmour's presidential candidacy in 2022.

== Life and career ==
Peltier was born in Paris.

He is a former member of the National Front (FN) and former leader of its youth section. He led The Strong Right, a right-wing populist faction of the Union for a Popular Movement (UMP), later The Republicans (LR), similar to The Popular Right faction. Peltier was a founder of the anti-abortion student group Young Christian Action (Jeunesse Action Chrétienté).

In 2014, he was elected as mayor of Neung-sur-Beuvron and chairman of the Communauté de Communes de la Sologne des Etangs.

In 2017, he was elected to the National Assembly in the 2nd constituency of Loir-et-Cher.

On 9 January 2022, Peltier joined Reconquête (R!) to become party leader Éric Zemmour's deputy, in support of Zemmour's campaign in the 2022 presidential election. Zemmour has stated Peltier joining the party would allow it to heavily increase its access into local political structures. Earlier, Peltier was spokesman (2016–2017) and vice president (2019–2021) of The Republicans (LR). In the 2022 French legislative election he lost his seat after being eliminated in the first round.
