= Free market =

Form of market-based economy

In economics, a free market is an economic system in which the prices of goods and services are determined by supply and demand expressed by sellers and buyers. Such markets, as modeled, operate without the intervention of government or any other external authority. Proponents of the free market as a normative ideal contrast it with a regulated market, in which a government intervenes in supply and demand by means of various methods such as taxes or regulations. In an idealized free market economy, prices for goods and services are set solely by the bids and offers of the participants.

Scholars contrast the concept of a free market with the concept of a coordinated market in fields of study such as political economy, new institutional economics, economic sociology, and political science. All of these fields emphasize the importance in currently existing market systems of rule-making institutions external to the simple forces of supply and demand which create space for those forces to control productive output and distribution. Although free markets are commonly associated with capitalism in contemporary usage and popular culture, free markets have also been components in some forms of market socialism.

Historically, free market has also been used synonymously with other economic policies. For instance proponents of laissez-faire capitalism may refer to it as free market capitalism because they claim it achieves the most economic freedom. In practice, governments usually intervene to reduce externalities such as greenhouse gas emissions; although they may use markets to do so, such as carbon emission trading.

== Economic systems ==
=== Capitalism ===
Capitalism is an economic system based on the private ownership of the means of production and their operation for profit. Central characteristics of capitalism include capital accumulation, competitive markets, a price system, private property and the recognition of property rights, voluntary exchange, and wage labor. In a capitalist market economy, decision-making and investments are determined by every owner of wealth, property or production ability in capital and financial markets whereas prices and the distribution of goods and services are mainly determined by competition in goods and services markets.

Economists, historians, political economists and sociologists have adopted different perspectives in their analyses of capitalism and have recognized various forms of it in practice. These include laissez-faire or free-market capitalism, state capitalism and welfare capitalism. Different forms of capitalism feature varying degrees of free markets, public ownership, obstacles to free competition and state-sanctioned social policies. The degree of competition in markets and the role of intervention and regulation as well as the scope of state ownership vary across different models of capitalism. The extent to which different markets are free and the rules defining private property are matters of politics and policy. Most of the existing capitalist economies are mixed economies that combine elements of free markets with state intervention and in some cases economic planning.

Market economies have existed under many forms of government and in many different times, places and cultures. Modern capitalist societies—marked by a universalization of money-based social relations, a consistently large and system-wide class of workers who must work for wages (the proletariat) and a capitalist class which owns the means of production—developed in Western Europe in a process that led to the Industrial Revolution. Capitalist systems with varying degrees of direct government intervention have since become dominant in the Western world and continue to spread. Capitalism has been shown to be strongly correlated with economic growth.

=== Classical Economics ===
For classical economists such as Adam Smith, the term free market refers to a market free from all forms of economic privilege, monopolies and artificial scarcities. They say this implies that economic rents, which they describe as profits generated from a lack of perfect competition, must be reduced or eliminated as much as possible through free competition.

Economic theory suggests the returns to land and other natural resources are economic rents that cannot be reduced in such a way because of their perfect inelastic supply. Some economic thinkers emphasize the need to share those rents as an essential requirement for a well functioning market. It is suggested this would both eliminate the need for regular taxes that have a negative effect on trade (see deadweight loss) as well as release land and resources that are speculated upon or monopolised, two features that improve the competition and free market mechanisms. Winston Churchill supported this view by the following statement: "Land is the mother of all monopoly". The American economist and social philosopher Henry George, the most famous proponent of this thesis, wanted to accomplish this through a high land value tax that replaces all other taxes. Followers of his ideas are often called Georgists or geoists and geolibertarians.

Léon Walras, one of the founders of the neoclassical economics who helped formulate the general equilibrium theory, had a very similar view. He argued that free competition could only be realized under conditions of state ownership of natural resources and land. Additionally, income taxes could be eliminated because the state would receive income to finance public services through owning such resources and enterprises.

=== Laissez-faire ===
The laissez-faire principle expresses a preference for an absence of non-market pressures on prices and wages such as those from discriminatory government taxes, subsidies, tariffs, regulations, or government-granted monopolies. In The Pure Theory of Capital, Friedrich Hayek argued that the goal is the preservation of the unique information contained in the price itself.

According to Karl Popper, the idea of the free market is paradoxical, as it requires interventions towards the goal of preventing interventions.

Although laissez-faire has been commonly associated with capitalism, there is a similar economic theory associated with socialism called left-wing or socialist laissez-faire, also known as free-market anarchism, free-market anti-capitalism and free-market socialism to distinguish it from laissez-faire capitalism. Critics of laissez-faire as commonly understood argue that a truly laissez-faire system would be anti-capitalist and socialist. American individualist anarchists such as Benjamin Tucker saw themselves as economic free-market socialists and political individualists while arguing that their "anarchistic socialism" or "individual anarchism" was "consistent Manchesterism".

=== Socialism ===
Various forms of socialism based on free markets have existed since the 19th century. Early notable socialist proponents of free markets include Pierre-Joseph Proudhon, Benjamin Tucker and the Ricardian socialists. These economists believed that genuinely free markets and voluntary exchange could not exist within the exploitative conditions of capitalism. These proposals ranged from various forms of worker cooperatives operating in a free-market economy such as the mutualist system proposed by Proudhon, to state-owned enterprises operating in unregulated and open markets. These models of socialism are not to be confused with other forms of market socialism (e.g. the Lange model) where publicly owned enterprises are coordinated by various degrees of economic planning, or where capital good prices are determined through marginal cost pricing.

Advocates of free-market socialism such as Jaroslav Vaněk argue that genuinely free markets are not possible under conditions of private ownership of productive property. Instead, he contends that the class differences and inequalities in income and power that result from private ownership enable the interests of the dominant class to skew the market to their favor, either in the form of monopoly and market power, or by utilizing their wealth and resources to legislate government policies that benefit their specific business interests. Additionally, Vanek states that workers in a socialist economy based on cooperative and self-managed enterprises have stronger incentives to maximize productivity because they would receive a share of the profits (based on the overall performance of their enterprise) in addition to receiving their fixed wage or salary. The stronger incentives to maximize productivity that he conceives as possible in a socialist economy based on cooperative and self-managed enterprises might be accomplished in a free-market economy if employee-owned companies were the norm as envisioned by various thinkers including Louis O. Kelso and James S. Albus.

Socialists also assert that free-market capitalism leads to an excessively skewed distributions of income and economic instabilities which in turn leads to social instability. Corrective measures in the form of social welfare, re-distributive taxation and regulatory measures and their associated administrative costs which are required create agency costs for society. These costs would not be required in a self-managed socialist economy.

Criticism of market socialism comes from two major directions. Economists Friedrich Hayek and George Stigler argued that socialism as a theory is not conducive to democratic systems and even the most benevolent state would face serious implementation problems.

More modern criticism of socialism and market socialism implies that even in a democratic system, socialism cannot reach the desired efficient outcome. This argument holds that democratic majority rule becomes detrimental to enterprises and industries, and that the formation of interest groups distorts the optimal market outcome.

== Concepts ==
=== Economic equilibrium ===
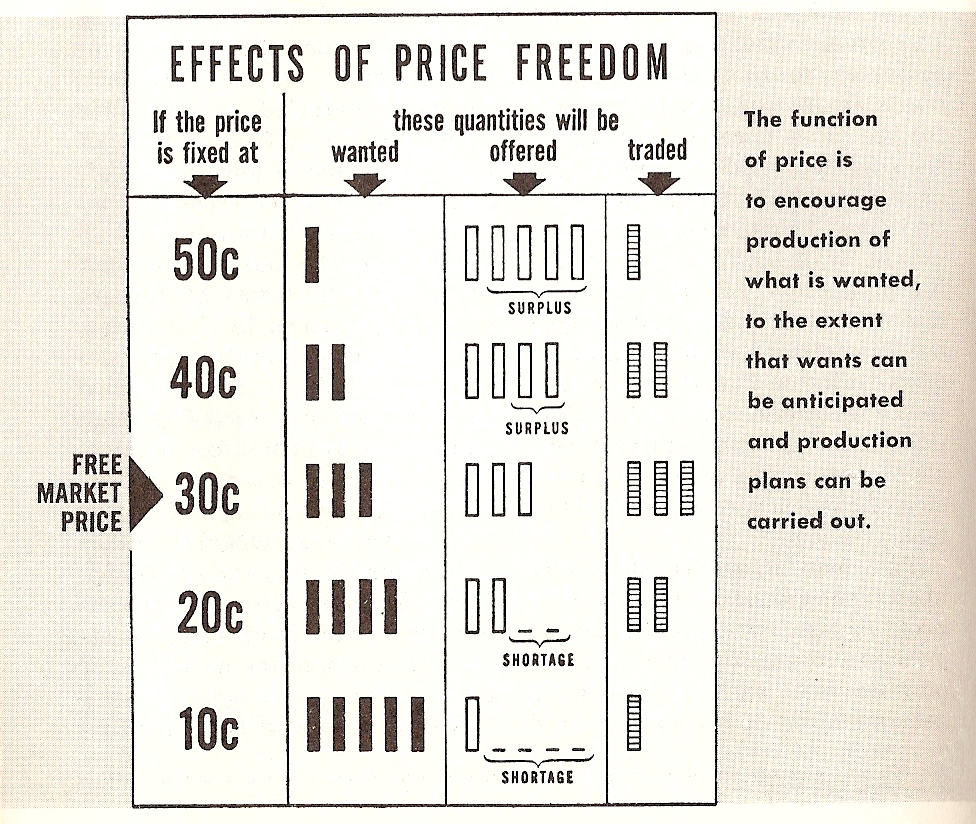
A diagram showing the "effects of price freedom"

The general equilibrium theory has demonstrated that, under certain theoretical conditions of perfect competition, the law of supply and demand influences prices toward an equilibrium that balances the demands for the products against the supplies. At these equilibrium prices, the market distributes the products to the purchasers according to each purchaser's preference or utility for each product and within the relative limits of each buyer's purchasing power. This result is described as market efficiency, or more specifically a Pareto optimum.

=== Low barriers to entry ===
A free market does not directly require the existence of competition; however, it does require a framework that freely allows new market entrants. Hence, competition in a free market is a consequence of the conditions of a free market, including that market participants not be obstructed from following their profit motive.

=== Perfect competition and market failure ===
An absence of any of the conditions of perfect competition is considered a market failure. Regulatory intervention may provide a substitute force to counter a market failure, which leads some economists to believe that some forms of market regulation may be better than an unregulated market at providing a free market.

=== Spontaneous order ===
Friedrich Hayek popularized the view that market economies promote spontaneous order which results in a better "allocation of societal resources than any design could achieve". According to this view, market economies are characterized by the formation of complex transactional networks that produce and distribute goods and services throughout the economy. These networks are not designed, but they nevertheless emerge as a result of decentralized individual economic decisions. The idea of spontaneous order is an elaboration on the invisible hand proposed by Adam Smith in The Wealth of Nations. About the individual, Smith wrote:

By preferring the support of domestic to that of foreign industry, he intends only his own security; and by directing that industry in such a manner as its produce may be of the greatest value, he intends only his own gain, and he is in this, as in many other cases, led by an invisible hand to promote an end which was no part of his intention. Nor is it always the worse for society that it was no part of it. By pursuing his own interest, he frequently promotes that of the society more effectually than when he really intends to promote it. I have never known much good done by those who affected to trade for the public good.

Smith pointed out that one does not get one's dinner by appealing to the brother-love of the butcher, the farmer or the baker. Rather, one appeals to their self-interest and pays them for their labor, arguing:

It is not from the benevolence of the butcher, the brewer or the baker, that we expect our dinner, but from their regard to their own self-interest. We address ourselves, not to their humanity but to their self-love, and never talk to them of our own necessities but of their advantages.

Supporters of this view claim that spontaneous order is superior to any order that does not allow individuals to make their own choices of what to produce, what to buy, what to sell and at what prices due to the number and complexity of the factors involved. They further believe that any attempt to implement central planning will result in more disorder, or a less efficient production and distribution of goods and services.

Critics such as political economist Karl Polanyi question whether a spontaneously ordered market can exist, completely free of distortions of political policy, claiming that even the ostensibly freest markets require a state to exercise coercive power in some areas, namely to enforce contracts, govern the formation of labor unions, spell out the rights and obligations of corporations, shape who has standing to bring legal actions and define what constitutes an unacceptable conflict of interest.

=== Supply and demand ===
Demand for an item (such as a good or service) refers to the economic market pressure from people trying to buy it. Buyers have a maximum price they are willing to pay for an item, and sellers have a minimum price at which they are willing to offer their product. The point at which the supply and demand curves meet is the equilibrium price of the good and quantity demanded. Sellers willing to offer their goods at a lower price than the equilibrium price receive the difference as producer surplus. Buyers willing to pay for goods at a higher price than the equilibrium price receive the difference as consumer surplus.

The model is commonly applied to wages in the market for labor. The typical roles of supplier and consumer are reversed. The suppliers are individuals, who try to sell (supply) their labor for the highest price. The consumers are businesses, which try to buy (demand) the type of labor they need at the lowest price. As more people offer their labor in that market, the equilibrium wage decreases and the equilibrium level of employment increases as the supply curve shifts to the right. The opposite happens if fewer people offer their wages in the market as the supply curve shifts to the left.

In a free market, individuals and firms taking part in these transactions have the liberty to enter, leave and participate in the market as they so choose. Prices and quantities are allowed to adjust according to economic conditions in order to reach equilibrium and allocate resources. However, in many countries around the world governments seek to intervene in the free market in order to achieve certain social or political agendas. Governments may attempt to create social equality or equality of outcome by intervening in the market through actions such as imposing a minimum wage (price floor) or erecting price controls (price ceiling).

Other lesser-known goals are also pursued, such as in the United States, where the federal government subsidizes owners of fertile land to not grow crops in order to prevent the supply curve from further shifting to the right and decreasing the equilibrium price. This is done under the justification of maintaining farmers' profits; due to the relative inelasticity of demand for crops, increased supply would lower the price but not significantly increase quantity demanded, thus placing pressure on farmers to exit the market. Those interventions are often done in the name of maintaining basic assumptions of free markets such as the idea that the costs of production must be included in the price of goods. Pollution and depletion costs are sometimes not included in the cost of production (a manufacturer that withdraws water at one location then discharges it polluted downstream, avoiding the cost of treating the water), therefore governments may opt to impose regulations in an attempt to try to internalize all of the cost of production and ultimately include them in the price of the goods.

Advocates of the free market contend that government intervention hampers economic growth by disrupting the efficient allocation of resources according to supply and demand while critics of the free market contend that government intervention is sometimes necessary to protect a country's economy from better-developed and more influential economies, while providing the stability necessary for wise long-term investment. Milton Friedman argued against central planning, price controls and state-owned corporations, particularly as practiced in the Soviet Union and China while Ha-Joon Chang cites the examples of post-war Japan and the growth of South Korea's steel industry as positive examples of government intervention.

== Reception ==
=== Criticism ===
Critics of a laissez-faire free market have argued that in real world situations it has proven to be susceptible to the development of price fixing monopolies. Such reasoning has led to government intervention, e.g. the United States antitrust law. Critics of the free market also argue that it results in significant market dominance, inequality of bargaining power, or information asymmetry, in order to allow markets to function more freely.

Critics of a free market often argue that some market failures require government intervention. Economists Ronald Coase, Milton Friedman, Ludwig von Mises, and Friedrich Hayek have responded by arguing that markets can internalize or adjust to supposed market failures.

Two prominent Canadian authors argue that government at times has to intervene to ensure competition in large and important industries. Naomi Klein illustrates this roughly in her work The Shock Doctrine and John Ralston Saul more humorously illustrates this through various examples in The Collapse of Globalism and the Reinvention of the World. While its supporters argue that only a free market can create healthy competition and therefore more business and reasonable prices, opponents say that a free market in its purest form may result in the opposite. According to Klein and Ralston, the merging of companies into giant corporations or the privatization of government-run industry and national assets often result in monopolies or oligopolies requiring government intervention to force competition and reasonable prices.

This criticism has been challenged by historians such as Lawrence Reed, who argued that monopolies have historically failed to form even in the absence of antitrust law. This is because monopolies are inherently difficult to maintain as a company that tries to maintain its monopoly by buying out new competitors, for instance, is incentivizing newcomers to enter the market in hope of a buy-out. Furthermore, according to writer Walter Lippman and economist Milton Friedman, historical analysis of the formation of monopolies reveals that, contrary to popular belief, these were the result not of unfettered market forces, but of legal privileges granted by government.

American philosopher and author Cornel West has derisively termed what he perceives as dogmatic arguments for laissez-faire economic policies as free-market fundamentalism. West has contended that such mentality "trivializes the concern for public interest" and "makes money-driven, poll-obsessed elected officials deferential to corporate goals of profit – often at the cost of the common good". American political philosopher Michael J. Sandel contends that in the last thirty years the United States has moved beyond just having a market economy and has become a market society where literally everything is for sale, including aspects of social and civic life such as education, access to justice and political influence. The economic historian Karl Polanyi was highly critical of the idea of the market-based society in his book The Great Transformation, stating that any attempt at its creation would undermine human society and the common good: "Ultimately...the control of the economic system by the market is of overwhelming consequence to the whole organization of society; it means no less than the running of society as an adjunct to the market. Instead of economy being embedded in social relations, social relations are embedded in the economic system."

David McNally of the University of Houston argues in the Marxist tradition that the logic of the market inherently produces inequitable outcomes and leads to unequal exchanges, arguing that Adam Smith's moral intent and moral philosophy espousing equal exchange was undermined by the practice of the free market he championed. According to McNally, the development of the market economy involved coercion, exploitation and violence that Smith's moral philosophy could not countenance. McNally also criticizes market socialists for believing in the possibility of fair markets based on equal exchanges to be achieved by purging parasitical elements from the market economy such as private ownership of the means of production, arguing that market socialism is an oxymoron when socialism is defined as an end to wage labour.

Elizabeth S. Anderson argues that early champions of the free market were progressive and actually envisioned their effects as liberating workers from the tyranny of feudal lords, but in reality this vision evaporated following the Industrial Revolution which established large, hierarchical corporations enforcing a new corporate serfdom, and also by neoliberal orthodoxy which posited that the workplace is a voluntary contract between equals, obscuring that it is a highly asymmetrical relationship as workers, upon entering the corporate workplace, effectively surrender their rights to an "authoritarian private government" which strictly regulates both their work life, and through employment-at-will, their off-duty life by firing workers for lifestyle choices, recreational activities, political speech, social media posts, or voicing criticism about working conditions.

== See also ==
- Binary economics
- Crony capitalism
- Corporatism
- Economic liberalism
- Freedom of choice
- Free price system
- Grey market
- Keynesian economics
- Market anarchism
- Market failure
- Market economy
- Monopoly
- Neoliberalism
- Participatory economics
- Quasi-market
- Regulated market
- Self-managed economy
- Transparency (market)
