= Free price system =

Mechanism of resource allocation

A free price system or free price mechanism (informally called the price system or the price mechanism) is a mechanism of resource allocation that relies upon prices set by the interchange of supply and demand. The resulting price signals communicated between producers and consumers determine the production and distribution of resources. Therefore the free price system rations supplies, distributes income, and allocates resources.

A free price system contrasts with an administered price system, where prices are administered by government in a controlled market. The price system, whether free or controlled, contrasts with physical and non-monetary economic planning.

== Mechanics of a free price system ==
A diagram presenting the argument for free prices

In a free price system, prices are not set by any agency or institution. Instead, they are determined in a decentralized fashion by trades that occur as a result of sellers' asking prices matching buyers' bid prices arising from subjective value judgement in a market economy. Since resources of consumers are limited at any given time, consumers are relegated to satisfying wants in a descending hierarchy and bidding prices relative to the urgency of a variety of wants. This information on relative values is communicated, through price signals, to producers whose resources are also limited. In turn, relative prices for the productive services are established. The interchange of these two sets of prices establish market value, and serve to guide the rationing of resources, distributing income, and allocating resources.

Those goods which command the highest prices (when summed among all individuals) provide an incentive for businesses to provide these goods in a corresponding descending hierarchy of priority. However, the ordering of this hierarchy of wants is not constant. Consumer preferences change. When consumer preferences for a good increase, then bidding pressure raises the price for a particular good as it moves to a higher position in the hierarchy. As a result of higher prices for this good, more productive forces are applied to satisfying the demand driven by the opportunity for higher profits in satisfying this new consumer preference. In other words, the high price sends a price signal to producers. This causes producers to increase supply, either by the same firms increasing production or new businesses coming into the market, which eventually lowers the price and the profit incentive to increase supplies. Hence, the now lower price provides a price signal to producers to decrease production and, as a result, a surplus is prevented. Since resources are scarce (including labor and capital), supplies of other goods will be diminished as the productive resources are taken from other areas of production to be applied toward increasing output of the good that has risen in the hierarchy of consumer preferences. Also, as resources become more scarce the price increases, which signals to consumers to reduce consumption thereby ensuring that the quantity demanded does not exceed the quantity supplied. It is in this way that the free price system persuades consumers to ration dwindling resources. Hence, supply and demand affect price, while at the same time price affects supply and demand. If prices remain high because increases in supply cannot keep pace with demand, then this also signals other business to provide substitute goods in order to take advantage of profit opportunities.

== See also ==
- Administered price
- Invisible hand
- Spontaneous order
- Self-organization
- Subjective theory of value
- Market economy
- Capitalism
- Free market
- Price signal
- Price system
