= RBP =

RBP may refer to:

== Biology and medicine ==
- Red blood cells (the 'RB'), and blood plasma (the 'P'), a blood transfusion product
- Retinol binding protein
- RNA-binding protein

== People ==
- Rachel Barton Pine (born 1974), American violinist
- Robert Baden-Powell (1857–1941), founder of the Scout Movement
- Robert B. Parker (1932-2010), American author

== Other ==
- Barababaraba language, an indigenous language of Australia (ISO 639-3 code: rbp)
- RBP, a 64-bit register in x86 chip architecture
- Relationship-based pricing, a pricing mechanism in banking
- Rock's Backpages, an Internet archive of rock music journalism
- Rock Bottom Price, code name for the Atari ST home computer
- Royal Bhutan Police, national police of Bhutan
- Royal Black Preceptory, Protestant fraternal organization
