= Price system =

Economic system

In economics a price system is a system through which the valuations of any forms of property (tangible or intangible) are determined.. All societies use price systems in the allocation and exchange of resources as a consequence of scarcity. Even in a barter system with no money, price systems are still utilized in the determination of exchange ratios (relative valuations) between the properties being exchanged.

A price system may be either a regulated price system (such as a fixed price system) where prices are administered by an authority, or it may be a free price system (such as a market system) where prices are left to float "freely" as determined by supply and demand without the intervention of an authority. A mixed price system involves a combination of both regulated and free price systems.

== History ==
Price systems have been around as long as there has been economic exchanges.

The price system has transformed into the system of global capitalism that is present in the early 21st century. The Soviet Union and other Communist states with a centralized planned economy maintained controlled price systems. Whether the ruble or the dollar is used in the economic system, the criterion of a price system is the use of money as an arbiter and usual final arbiter of whether a thing is done or not. In other words, few things are done without consideration for the monetary costs and the potential making of a profit in a price system.

=== Debate on socialism ===
The American economist Thorstein Veblen wrote a seminal tract on the development of the term as discussed in this article: The Engineers and the Price System. Its chapter VI, A Memorandum on a Practicable Soviet of Technicians discusses the possibility of socialist revolution in the United States comparable to that then occurring in Russia (the Soviets had not yet at that time become a state (USSR formed in 1922)).

According to Bockman, the original conception of socialism involved the substitution of money as a unit of calculation and monetary prices as a whole with calculation in kind (or valuation based on natural units), with business and financial decisions replaced by engineering and technical criteria for managing the economy. Fundamentally, this meant that socialism would operate under different economic dynamics than those of capitalism and the price system.

In the 1930s, the economists Oskar Lange and Abba Lerner developed a comprehensive model of a socialist economy that utilized a price system and money for the allocation of capital goods. In contrast to a free-market price system, "socialist" prices would be set by a planning board to equal the marginal cost of production to achieve neoclassical Pareto efficiency. Because this model of socialism relied upon money and administered prices as opposed to non-monetary calculation in physical magnitudes, it was labelled "market socialism". In effect, Oskar Lange conceded that calculations in a socialist system would have to be performed in value terms with a functioning price system rather than using purely natural or engineering criteria as in the classic concept of socialism.

=== Hayek ===
Austrian School economist Friedrich Hayek argued that a free price system allowed economic coordination via the price signals that changing prices send, which is regarded as one of his most significant and influential contributions to economics.

In "The Use of Knowledge in Society" (1945), Hayek wrote, "The price system is just one of those formations which man has learned to use (though he is still very far from having learned to make the best use of it) after he had stumbled upon it without understanding it. Through it not only a division of labor but also a coordinated utilization of resources based on an equally divided knowledge has become possible. The people who like to deride any suggestion that this may be so usually distort the argument by insinuating that it asserts that by some miracle just that sort of system has spontaneously grown up which is best suited to modern civilization. It is the other way round: man has been able to develop that division of labor on which our civilization is based because he happened to stumble upon a method which made it possible. Had he not done so, he might still have developed some other, altogether different, type of civilization, something like the "state" of the termite ants, or some other altogether unimaginable type."

== See also ==
- Free price system
- Regulated market
- Planned economy
- Catallactics
- Economic calculation debate
- Economic history
- History of economic thought
- Lange model
- Market economy
- Price mechanism
