= Would you like fries with that =

The phrase Would you like fries with that may refer to:

- its use as an example of retail marketing
- an episode of Top Chef Masters
- an episode of Mona the Vampire
- Fries with That?, a Canadian sitcom
