= Retail marketing =

Economic concept

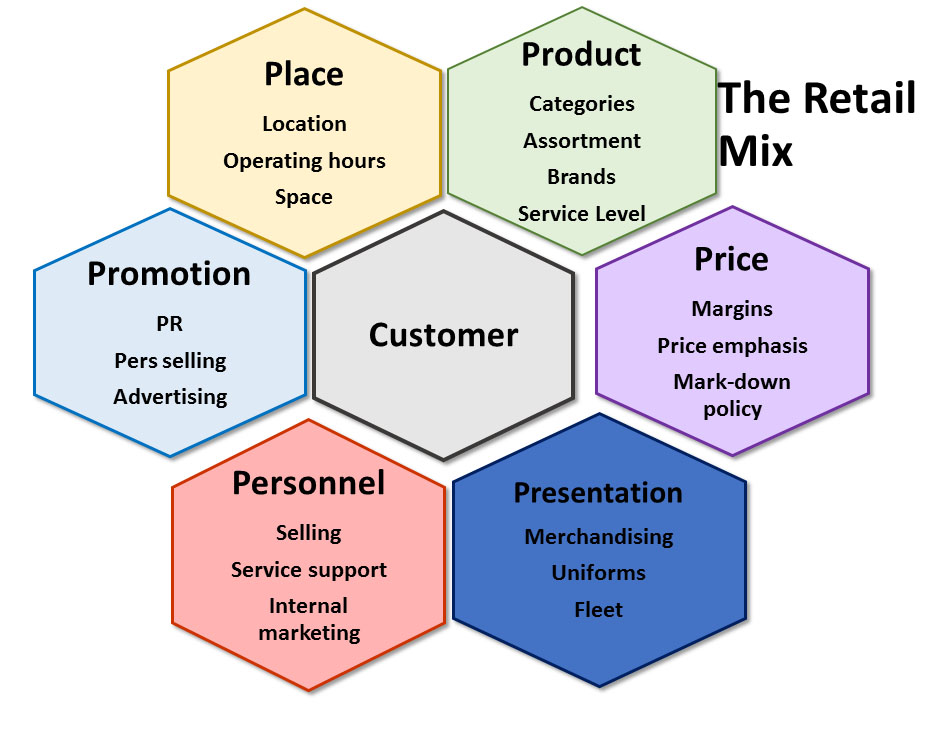
The retail marketing mix or the 6 Ps of retailing

Once the strategic plan is in place, retail managers turn to the more managerial aspects of planning. A retail mix is devised for the purpose of coordinating day-to-day tactical decisions. The retail marketing mix typically consists of six broad decision layers including product decisions, place decisions, promotion, price, personnel and presentation (also known as physical evidence). The retail mix is loosely based on the marketing mix, but has been expanded and modified in line with the unique needs of the retail context. A number of scholars have argued for an expanded marketing, mix with the inclusion of two new Ps, namely, Personnel and Presentation since these contribute to the customer's unique retail experience and are the principal basis for retail differentiation. Yet other scholars argue that the Retail Format (i.e. retail formula) should be included. The modified retail marketing mix that is most commonly cited in textbooks is often called the 6 Ps of retailing (see diagram at right).

== Product ==
See Product management

The primary product-related decisions facing the retailer are the product assortment (what product lines, how many lines and which brands to carry); the type of customer service (high contact through to self-service) and the availability of support services (e.g. credit terms, delivery services, after sales care). These decisions depend on careful analysis of the market, demand, competition as well as the retailer's skills and expertise.

=== Product assortment ===
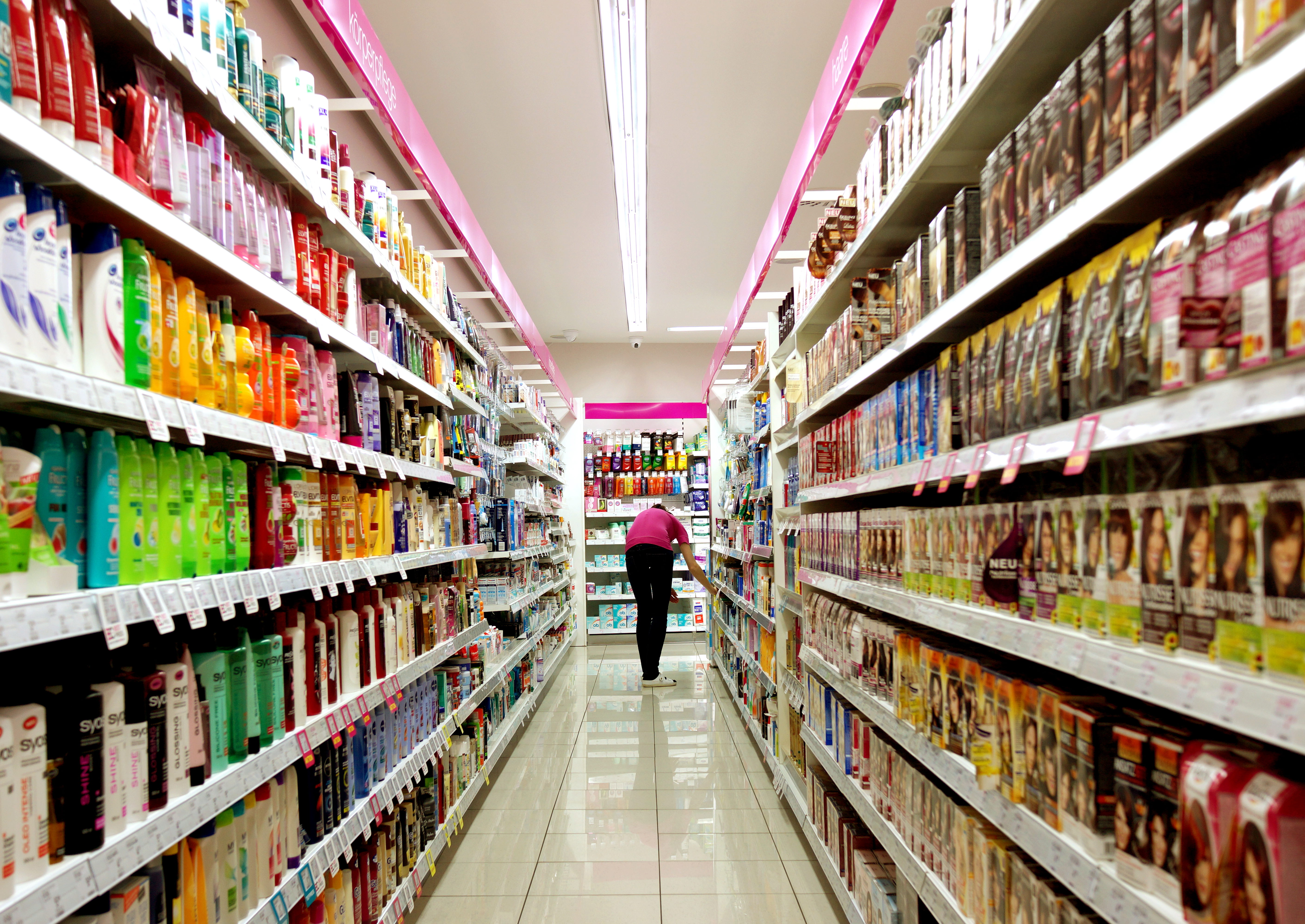
A typical supermarket carries an assortment of between 30,000 and 60,000 different products.

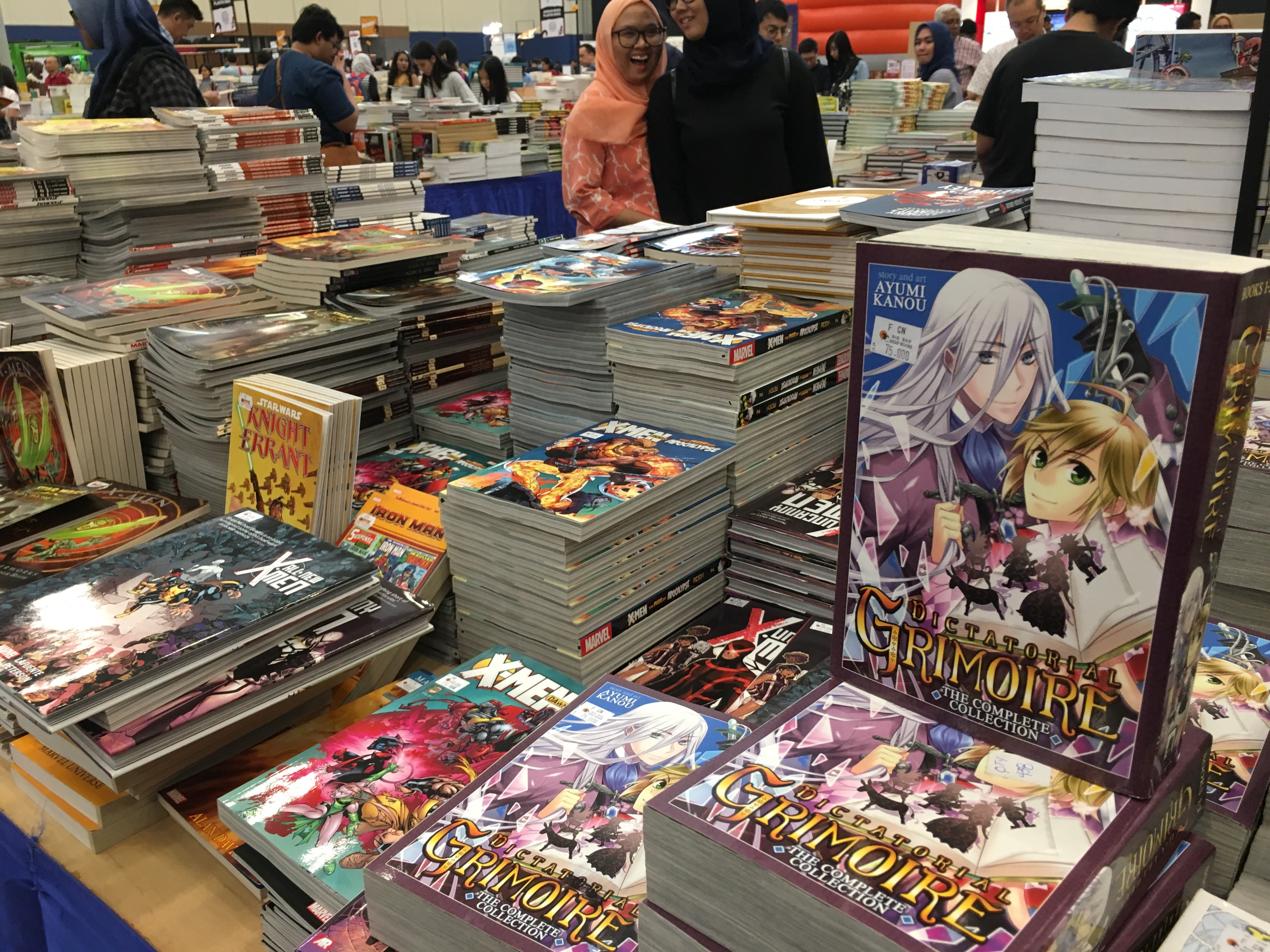
Assorted books

The term product assortment refers to the combination of both product breadth and depth. The main characteristics of a company's product assortment are:

(1) the length or number of products lines
the number of different products carried by a store
(2) the breadth
refers to the variety of product lines that a store offers. It is also known as product assortment width, merchandise breadth, and product line width.:
(3) depth or number of product varieties within a product line
the number of each item or particular styles carried by a store
(4) consistency
how products relate to each other in a retail environment.

For a retailer, finding the right balance between breadth and depth can be a key to success. An average supermarket might carry 30,000–60,000 different product lines (product length or assortment), but might carry up to 100 different types of toothpaste (product depth). Speciality retailers typically carry fewer product lines, perhaps as few as 20 lines, but will normally stock greater depth. Costco, for example, carries 5,000 different lines while Aldi carries just 1,400 lines per store.

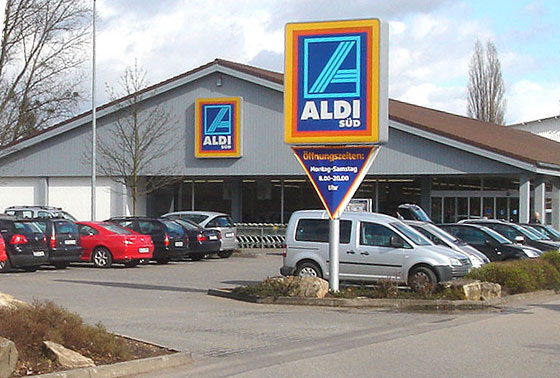
Discount grocery retailer, Aldi, has successfully trimmed the number of product lines it carries to about 1,400.

Large assortments offer consumers many benefits, notably increased choice and the possibility that the consumer will be able to locate the ideal product. However, for the retailer, larger assortments incur costs in terms of record-keeping, managing inventory, pricing and risks associated with wastage due to spoiled, shopworn or unsold stock. Carrying more stock also exposes the retailer to higher risks in terms of slow-moving stock and lower sales per square foot of store space. On the other hand, reducing the number of product lines can generate cost savings through increased stock turnover by eliminating slow-moving lines, fewer stockouts, increased bargaining power with suppliers, reduced costs associated with wastage and carrying inventory, and higher sales per square foot which means more efficient space utilisation.

When determining the number of product lines to carry, the retailer must consider the store type, the store's physical storage capacity, the perishability of items, the expected turnover rates for each line, and the customer's needs and expectations.

=== Customer service and supporting services ===
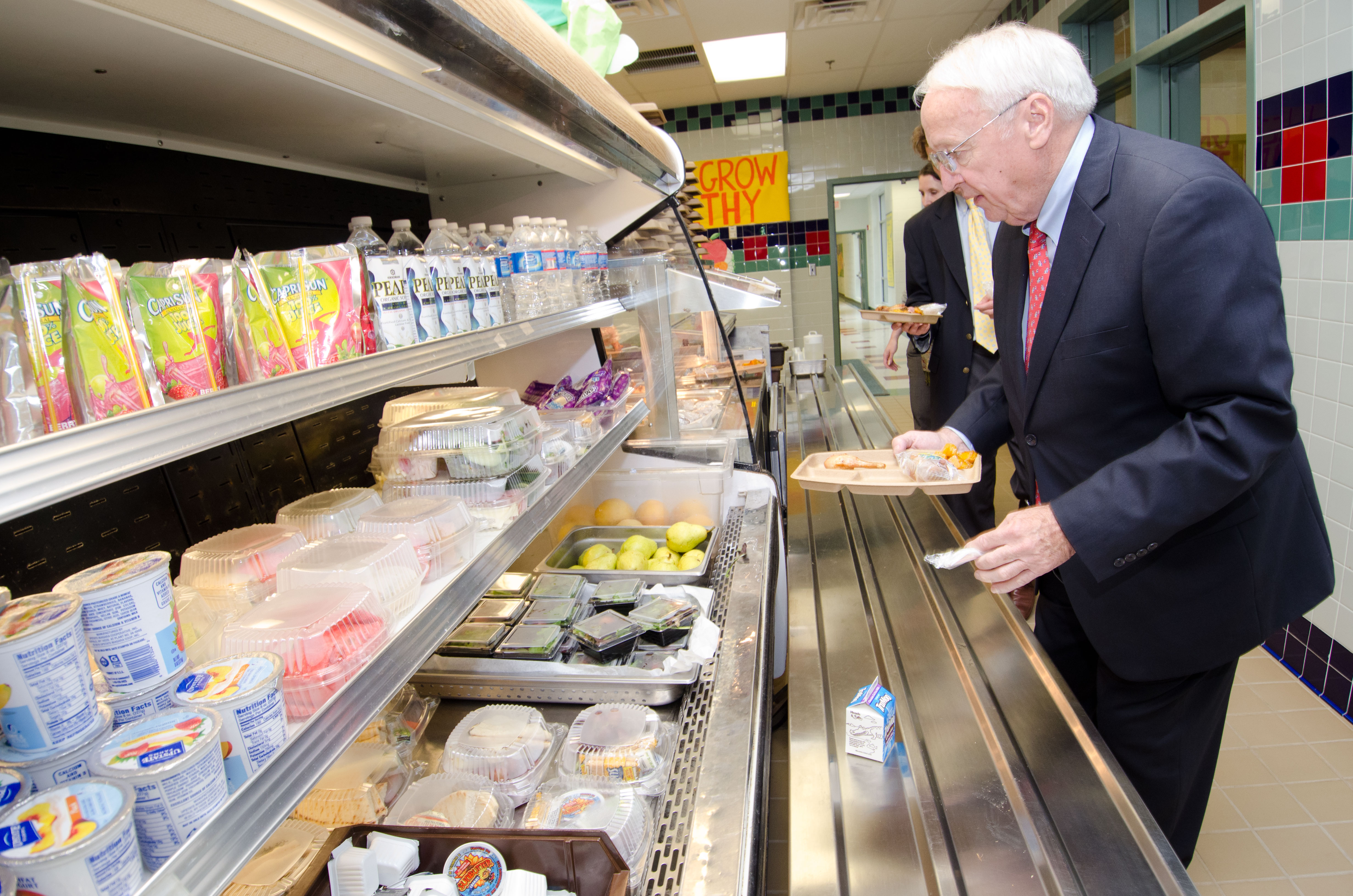
Self-service is a more cost efficient way to deliver goods.

Customer service is the "sum of acts and elements that allow consumers to receive what they need or desire from [the] retail establishment." Retailers must decide whether to provide a full service outlet or minimal service outlet, such as no-service in the case of vending machines; self-service with only basic sales assistance or a full service operation as in many boutiques and speciality stores. In addition, the retailer needs to make decisions about sales support such as customer delivery and after sales customer care.

Retailing services may also include the provision of credit, delivery services, advisory services, exchange/ return services, product demonstrations, special orders, customer loyalty programs, limited-scale trials, and a range of other supporting services. Retail stores often seek to differentiate themselves along customer service lines. For example, some department stores offer the services of a stylist; a fashion advisor, to assist customers in selecting a fashionable wardrobe for the forthcoming season, while smaller boutiques may allow regular customers to take goods home on approval, enabling them to try out goods before making the final purchase. The variety of supporting services offered is known as the service type. At one end of the spectrum, self-service operators offer few basic support services. At the other end of the spectrum, full-service operators offer a broad range of highly personalised customer services to augment the retail experience.

When making decisions about customer service, the retailer balances the customer's requirement for service against the customer's willingness to pay for the cost of those services. Self-service reduces costs because the customer performs various retail tasks. However, some customers prefer full service and pay more for that level of service.

A sales assistant's role typically includes greeting customers, providing product and service-related information, providing advice about products available from current stock, answering customer questions, finalising customer transactions and if necessary, providing follow-up service necessary to ensure customer satisfaction. For retail store owners, it is extremely important to train personnel with the requisite skills necessary to deliver excellent customer service. Such skills may include product knowledge, inventory management, handling cash and credit transactions, handling product exchange and returns, dealing with difficult customers and of course, a detailed knowledge of store policies. The provision of excellent customer service creates more opportunities to build enduring customer relationships with the potential to turn customers into sources of referral or retail advocates. In the long term, excellent customer service provides businesses with an ongoing reputation and may lead to a competitive advantage. Customer service is essential for several reasons. Firstly, customer service contributes to the customer's overall retail experience. Secondly, evidence suggests that a retail organization that trains its employees in appropriate customer service benefits more than those who do not. Customer service training entails instructing personnel in the methods of servicing the customer that will benefit corporations and businesses. It is important to establish a bond amongst customers-employees known as Customer relationship management.

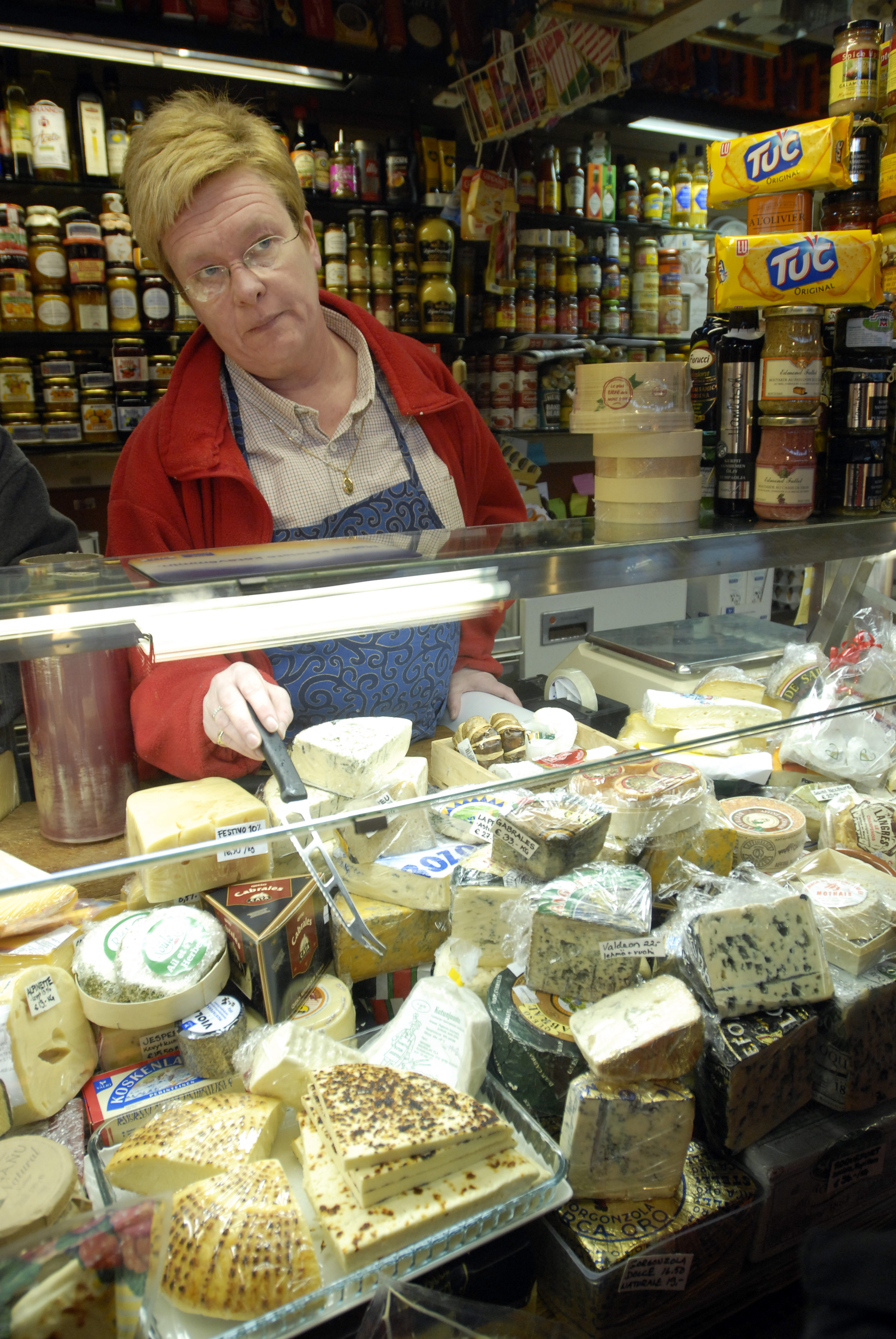
Counter service is associated with full-service retail outlets and allows the salesperson to provide expert advice.

==== Types of customer service ====
There are several ways the retailer can deliver services to consumers:

- Counter service, where goods are out of reach of buyers and must be obtained from the seller. This type of retail is common for small expensive items (e.g. jewellery) and controlled items like medicine and liquor.
- Curbside pickup, where orders are placed online, via a mobile app, or called in, then the customer picks up the product on the property of but outside of the physical store. The coronavirus pandemic is making curbside pickup much more valuable to customers
- Ship to Store, where products are ordered online and can be picked up at the retailer's main store
- Delivery, where goods are shipped directly to consumer's homes or workplaces.
- Mail order from a printed catalogue was invented in 1744 and was common in the late 19th and early 20th centuries. Ordering by telephone was common in the 20th century, either from a catalog, newspaper, television advertisement or a local restaurant menu, for immediate service (especially for pizza delivery), remaining in common use for food orders. Internet shopping – a form of delivery – has eclipsed phone-ordering, and, in several sectors – such as books and music – all other forms of buying. There is increasing competitor pressure to deliver consumer goods – especially those offered online – in a more timely fashion. Large online retailers such as Amazon.com are continually innovating and as of 2015 offer one-hour delivery in certain areas. They are also working with drone technology to provide consumers with more efficient delivery options. Direct marketing, including telemarketing and television shopping channels, are also used to generate telephone orders. started gaining significant market share in developed countries in the 2000s.
- Door-to-door sales, where the salesperson sometimes travels with the goods for sale.
- Self-service, where goods may be handled and examined prior to purchase.
- Digital delivery or Download, where intangible goods, such as music, film, and electronic books and subscriptions to magazines, are delivered directly to the consumer in the form of information transmitted either over wires or air-waves and is reconstituted by a device which the consumer controls (such as an MP3 player; see digital rights management). The digital sale of models for 3D printing also fits here, as do the media leasing types of services, such as streaming.

== Place ==
Place decisions are primarily concerned with consumer access and may involve location, space utilisation and operating hours.

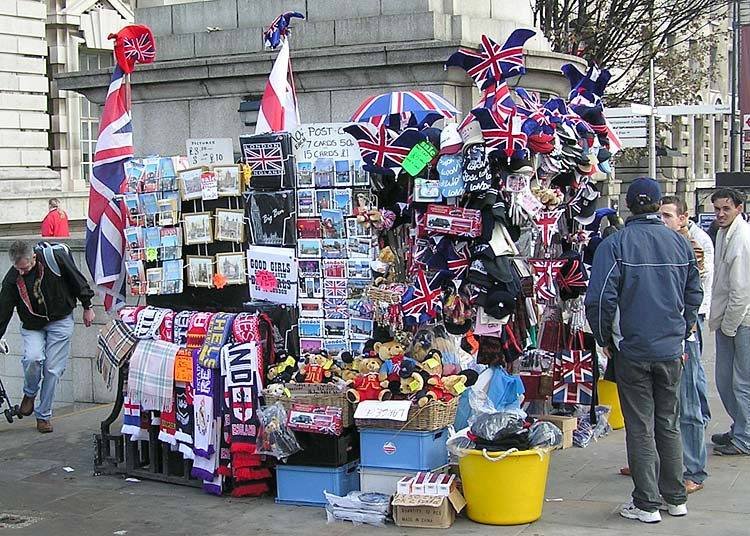
Sellers of souvenirs are typically located in high traffic areas such as this London souvenir stand situated near a railway station on a busy street corner.

=== Location ===
Also see Site selection

The perspective of marketing in large-scale enterprises is based on the theory of supply chain management; it emphasizes that the suppliers, large-scale retail enterprises, and customers form a chain of cooperative marketing that establishes mutually beneficial long-term relationships. Relationship marketing of huge retail enterprises from the perspective of supply chain mainly includes two relationship markets, supplier relationships, and customer relationships, as the two greatest influences on retail profits are suppliers and customers. First, as the supplier of commodities to retail enterprises, it directly determines the procurement cost of commodities to retail enterprises, which is mainly reflected in the purchase price of commodities themselves, the cost incurred in the procurement process, and the loss cost caused by unstable supply of commodities. In addition, the good relationship with supplier interaction, large retail enterprises can also promote the suppliers timely grasp the market information, improved or innovative products according to customer demand, which contributed to the retail enterprises improve the market competitiveness of the goods are sold, so the retail enterprise's relationship with the supplier directly affects the retail enterprises in the commercial product competitive. Second, due to the transfer of advantages between buyers and sellers, the retail industry has turned to the buyer's market, and consumers have become the key resources for major retailers to compete with each other. Therefore, it is very important to establish a good relationship with clients and improve customer loyalty. The relationship marketing of customer relationship market regards the transaction with clients as a long term activity. Retail enterprises should pursue long-term mutual benefit maximization rather than a single transaction sales profit maximization. This requires large retail enterprises to establish a customer-oriented trading relationship with the customer relationship market. Retail stores are typically located where market opportunities are optimal – high traffic areas, central business districts. Selecting the right site can be a major success factor. When evaluating potential sites, retailers often carry out a trade area analysis; a detailed analysis designed to approximate the potential patronage area. Techniques used in trade area analysis include: Radial (ring) studies; Gravity models and Drive time analyses.

In addition, retailers may consider a range of both qualitative and quantitative factors to evaluate to potential sites under consideration:

==== Macro factors ====
Macro factors include market characteristics (demographic, economic and socio-cultural), demand, competition and infrastructure (e.g. the availability of power, roads, public transport systems)

==== Micro factors ====
Micro factors include the size of the site (e.g. availability of parking), access for delivery vehicles

=== Channels ===
A major retail trend has been the shift to multi-channel retailing. To counter the disruption caused by online retail, many bricks and mortar retailers have entered the online retail space, by setting up online catalogue sales and e-commerce websites and apps. However, many retailers have noticed that consumers behave differently when shopping online. For instance, in terms of choice of online platform, shoppers tend to choose the online site of their preferred retailer initially, but as they gain more experience in online shopping, they become less loyal and more likely to switch to other retail sites. Online stores are usually available 24 hours a day, and many consumers in Western countries have Internet access both at work and at home.

The COVID-19 pandemic has greatly accelerated shoppers move to online grocery shopping, and has led substantial growth in online grocery shopping. As a result, retailers have begun to invest more in their online platforms and to use the benefits of online shopping such as personalizations, AI, and machine-learning models to help them better understand their customer in all the various channels users can now shop from.

== Pricing strategy and tactics ==
See also Pricing Strategies

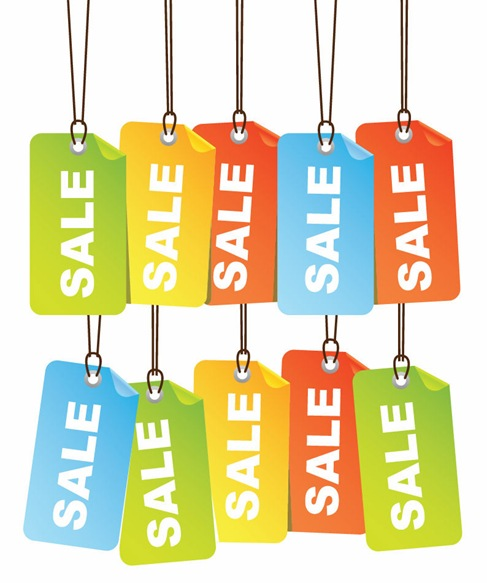
A price tag is a highly visual and objective guide to value.

The broad pricing strategy is normally established in the company's overall strategic plan. In the case of chain stores, the pricing strategy would be set by head office. Broadly, there are six approaches to pricing strategy mentioned in the marketing literature:

Operations-oriented pricing: where the objective is to optimise productive capacity, to achieve operational efficiencies, or to match supply and demand through varying prices. In some cases, prices might be set to demarket.

Revenue-oriented pricing: (also known as profit-oriented pricing or cost-based pricing) – where the marketer seeks to maximise the profits (i.e., the surplus income over costs) or simply to cover costs and break even.

Customer-oriented pricing: where the objective is to maximise the number of customers; encourage cross-selling opportunities or to recognise different levels in the customer's ability to pay.

Value-based pricing: (also known as image-based pricing) occurs where the company uses prices to signal market value or associates price with the desired value position in the mind of the buyer. The aim of value-based pricing is to reinforce the overall positioning strategy e.g. premium pricing posture to pursue or maintain a luxury image.

Relationship-oriented pricing: where the marketer sets prices in order to build or maintain relationships with existing or potential customers.

Socially-oriented pricing: Where the objective is to encourage or discourage specific social attitudes and behaviours. e.g. high tariffs on tobacco to discourage smoking.

=== Pricing tactics ===
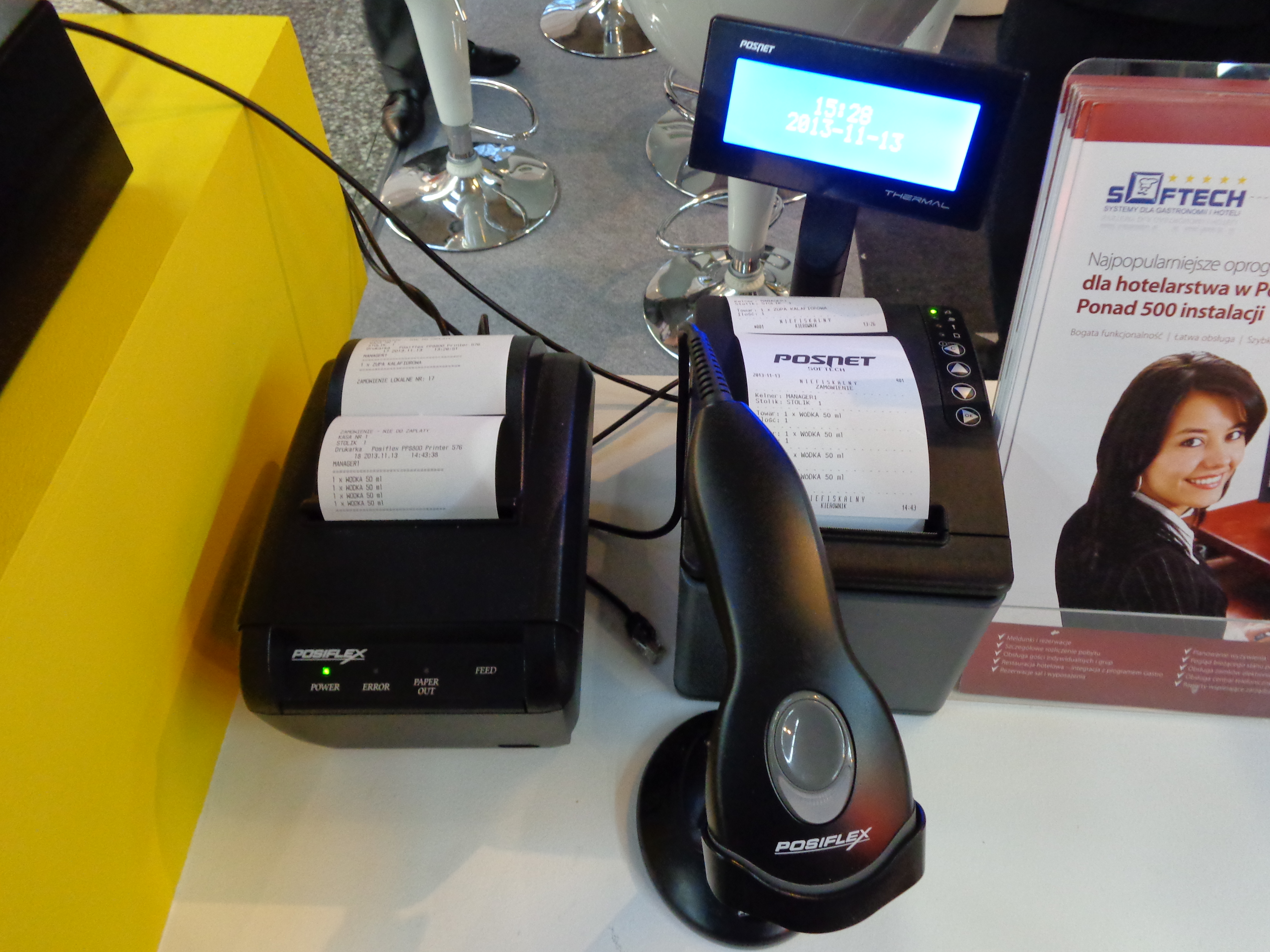
Retailers must also plan for mode of payment.

When decision-makers have determined the broad approach to pricing (i.e., the pricing strategy), they turn their attention to pricing tactics. Tactical pricing decisions are shorter term prices, designed to accomplish specific short-term goals. The tactical approach to pricing may vary from time to time, depending on a range of internal considerations (e.g. the need to clear surplus inventory) or external factors (e.g. a response to competitive pricing tactics). Accordingly, a number of different pricing tactics may be employed in the course of a single planning period or across a single year. Typically store managers have the necessary latitude to vary prices on individual lines provided that they operate within the parameters of the overall strategic approach.

Retailers must also plan for customer preferred payment modes – e.g. cash, credit, lay-by, Electronic Funds Transfer at Point-of-Sale (EFTPOS). All payment options require some type of handling and attract costs. If credit is to be offered, then credit terms will need to be determined. If lay-by is offered, then the retailer will need to take into account the storage and handling requirements. If cash is the dominant mode of payment, the retailer will need to consider small change requirements, the number of cash floats required, wages costs associated with handling large volumes of cash and the provision of secure storage for change floats. Large retailers, handling significant volumes of cash, may need to hire security service firms to carry the day's takings and deliver supplies of small change. A small, but increasing number of retailers are beginning to accept newer modes of payment including PayPal and Bitcoin. For example, Subway (US) recently announced that it would accept Bitcoin payments.

Contrary to common misconception, price is not the most important factor for consumers, when deciding to buy a product.

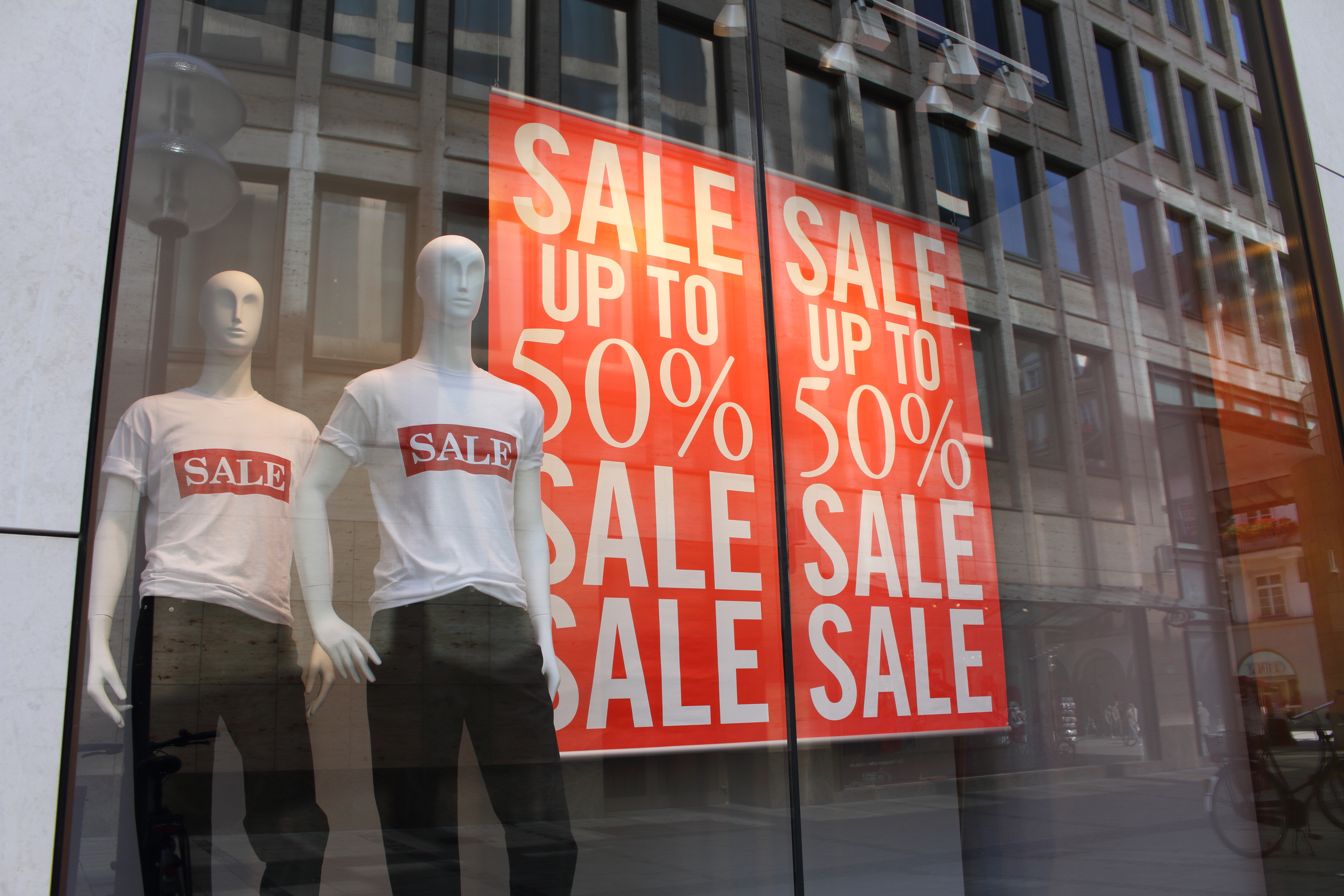
A discount is any form of reduction in price.

Pricing tactics that are commonly used in retail include:

Discount pricing

Discount pricing is where the marketer or retailer offers a reduced price. Discounts in a variety of forms – e.g. quantity discounts, loyalty rebates, seasonal discounts, periodic or random discounts etc.

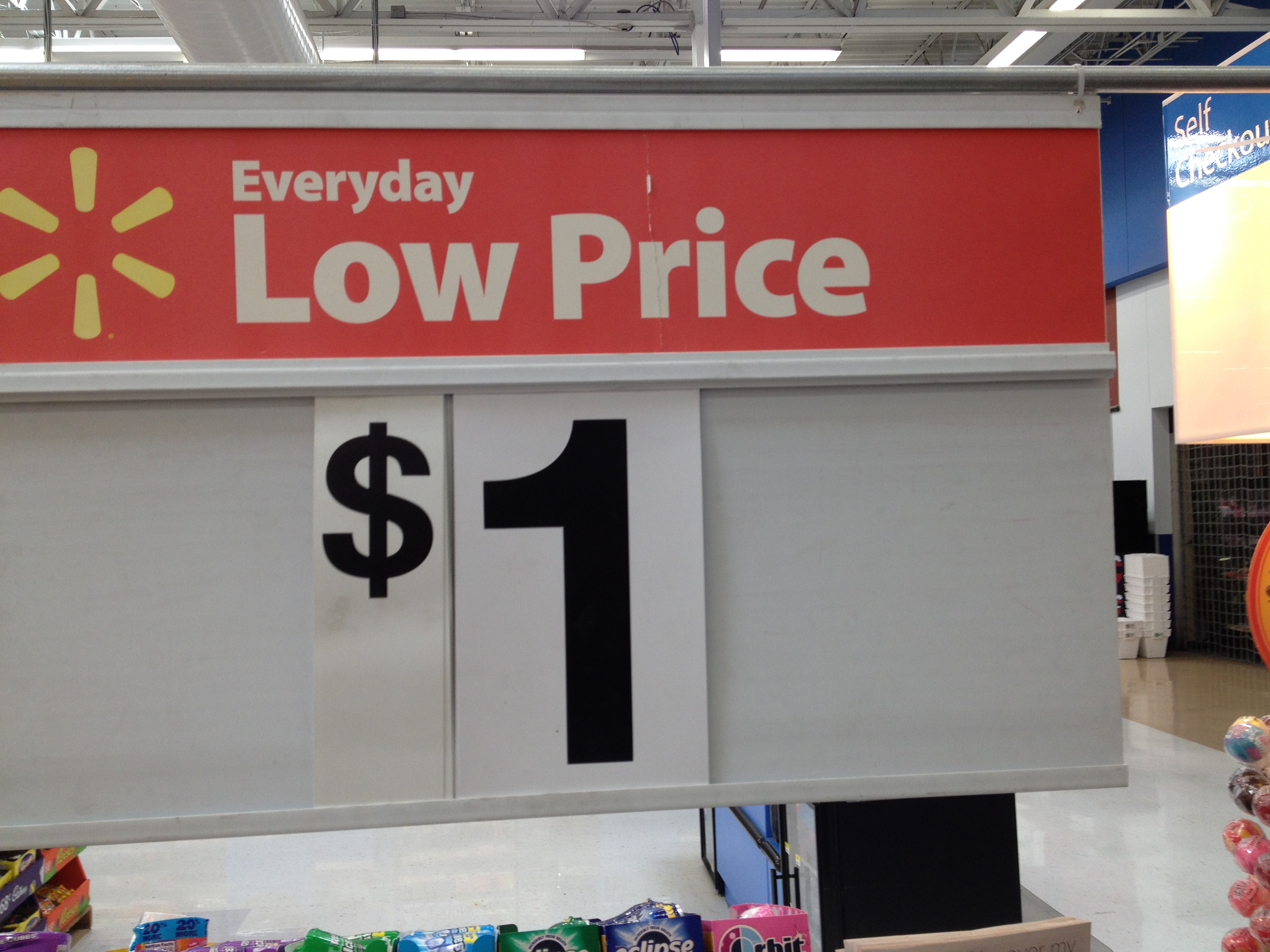
"Everyday Low Prices" are widely used in supermarkets.

Everyday low prices (EDLP)

Everyday low prices refers to the practice of maintaining a regular low price-low price – in which consumers are not forced to wait for discounting or specials. This method is extensively used by supermarkets.

High-low pricing

High-low pricing refers to the practice of offering goods at a high price for a period of time, followed by offering the same goods at a low price for a predetermined time. This practice is widely used by chain stores selling homewares. The main disadvantage of the high-low tactic is that consumers tend to become aware of the price cycles and time their purchases to coincide with the low-price cycle.

Loss leader

A loss leader is a product that has a price set below the operating margin. Loss leaders are widely used in supermarkets and budget-priced retail outlets where it is intended to generate store traffic. The low price is widely promoted and the store is prepared to take a small loss on an individual item, with an expectation that it will recoup that loss when customers purchase other higher priced-higher margin items. In service industries, the practice sometimes consists charging a reduced price on the first order as an inducement and with anticipation of charging higher prices on subsequent orders.

Price bundling

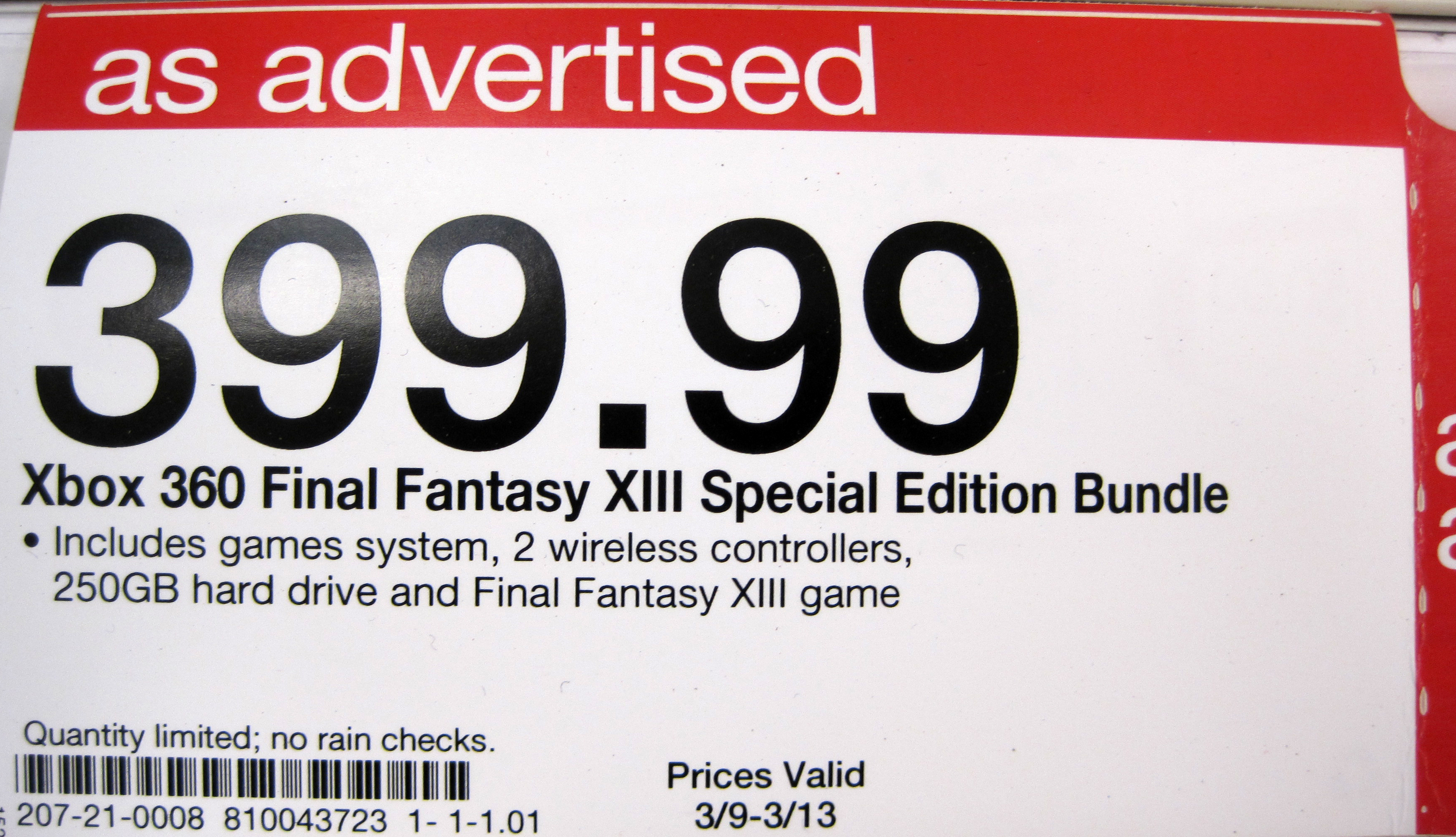
Xbox price bundle price

Price bundling (also known as product bundling) occurs where two or more products or services are priced as a package with a single price. There are several types of bundles: pure bundles where the goods can only be purchased as a package or mixed bundles where the goods can be purchased individually or as a package. The prices of the bundle are typically less than when the two items are purchased separately. Price bundling is extensively used in the personal care sector to price cosmetics and skincare.

Price lining

Price lining is the use of a limited number of prices for all products offered by a business. Price lining is a tradition started in the old five and dime stores in which everything cost either 5 or 10 cents. In price lining, the price remains constant but the quality or extent of product or service adjusted to reflect changes in cost. The underlying rationale of this tactic is that these amounts are seen as suitable price points for a whole range of products by prospective customers. It has the advantage of ease of administering, but the disadvantage of inflexibility, particularly in times of inflation or unstable prices. Price lining continues to be widely used in department stores where customers often note racks of garments or accessories priced at predetermined price points e.g. separate racks of men's ties, where each rack is priced at $10, $20 and $40.

Promotional pricing

Promotional pricing is a temporary measure that involves setting prices at levels lower than normally charged for a good or service. Promotional pricing is sometimes a reaction to unforeseen circumstances, as when a downturn in demand leaves a company with excess stocks; or when competitive activity is making inroads into market share or profits.

Psychological pricing

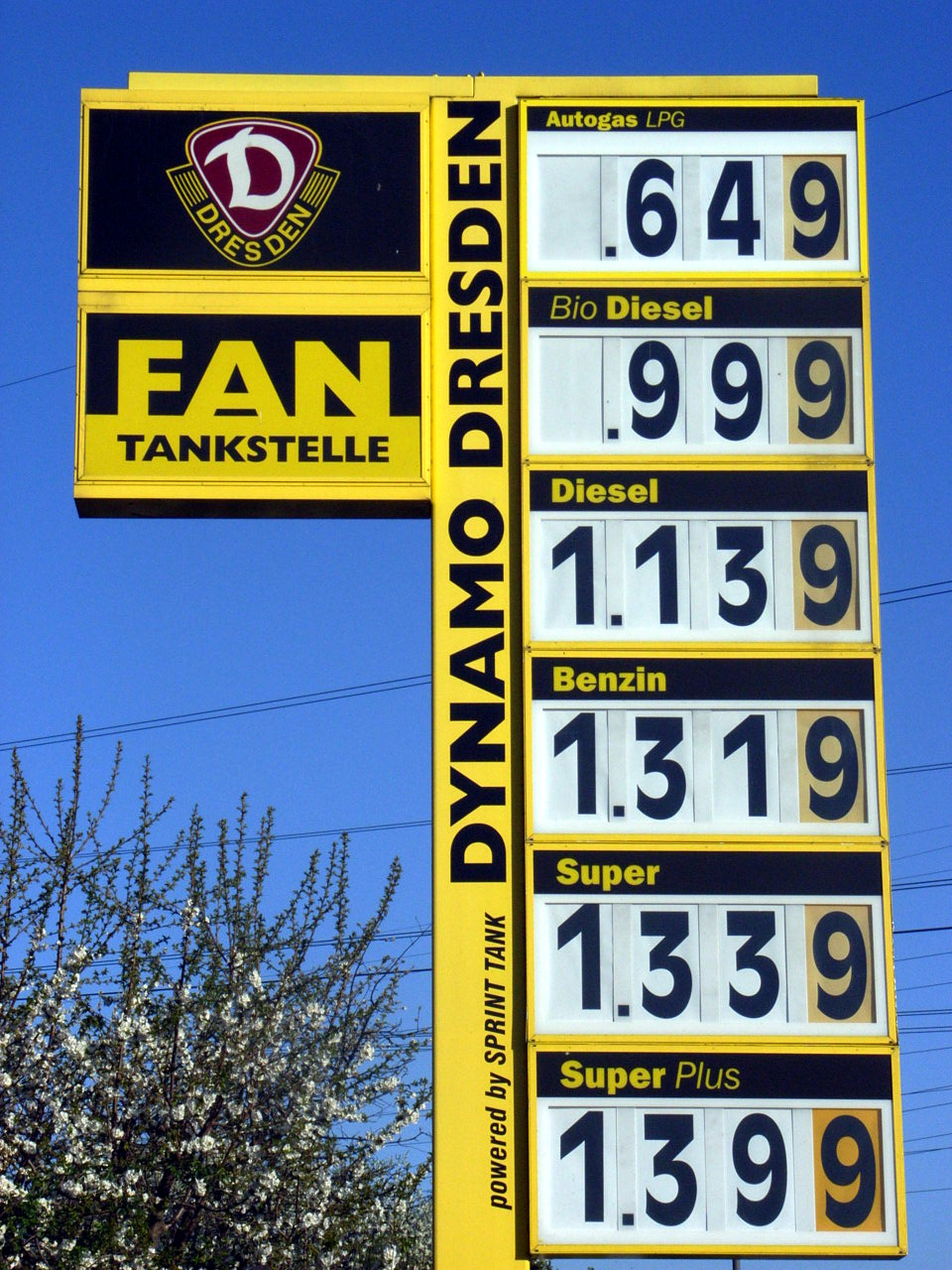
Extensive use of the terminal digit 'nine' suggests that psychological pricing is at play.

Psychological pricing is a range of tactics designed to have a positive psychological impact. Price tags using the terminal digit "9", ($9.99, $19.99 or $199.99) can be used to signal price points and bring an item in at just under the consumer's reservation price. Psychological pricing is widely used in a variety of retail settings.

== Personnel and staffing ==
Because patronage at a retail outlet varies, flexibility in scheduling is desirable. Employee scheduling software is sold, which, using known patterns of customer patronage, more or less reliably predicts the need for staffing for various functions at times of the year, day of the month or week, and time of day. Usually needs vary widely. Conforming staff utilization to staffing needs requires a flexible workforce which is available when needed but does not have to be paid when they are not, part-time workers; as of 2012 70% of retail workers in the United States were part-time. This may result in financial problems for the workers, who while they are required to be available at all times if their work hours are to be maximized, may not have sufficient income to meet their family and other obligations.

=== Selling and sales techniques ===
Also see Personal selling

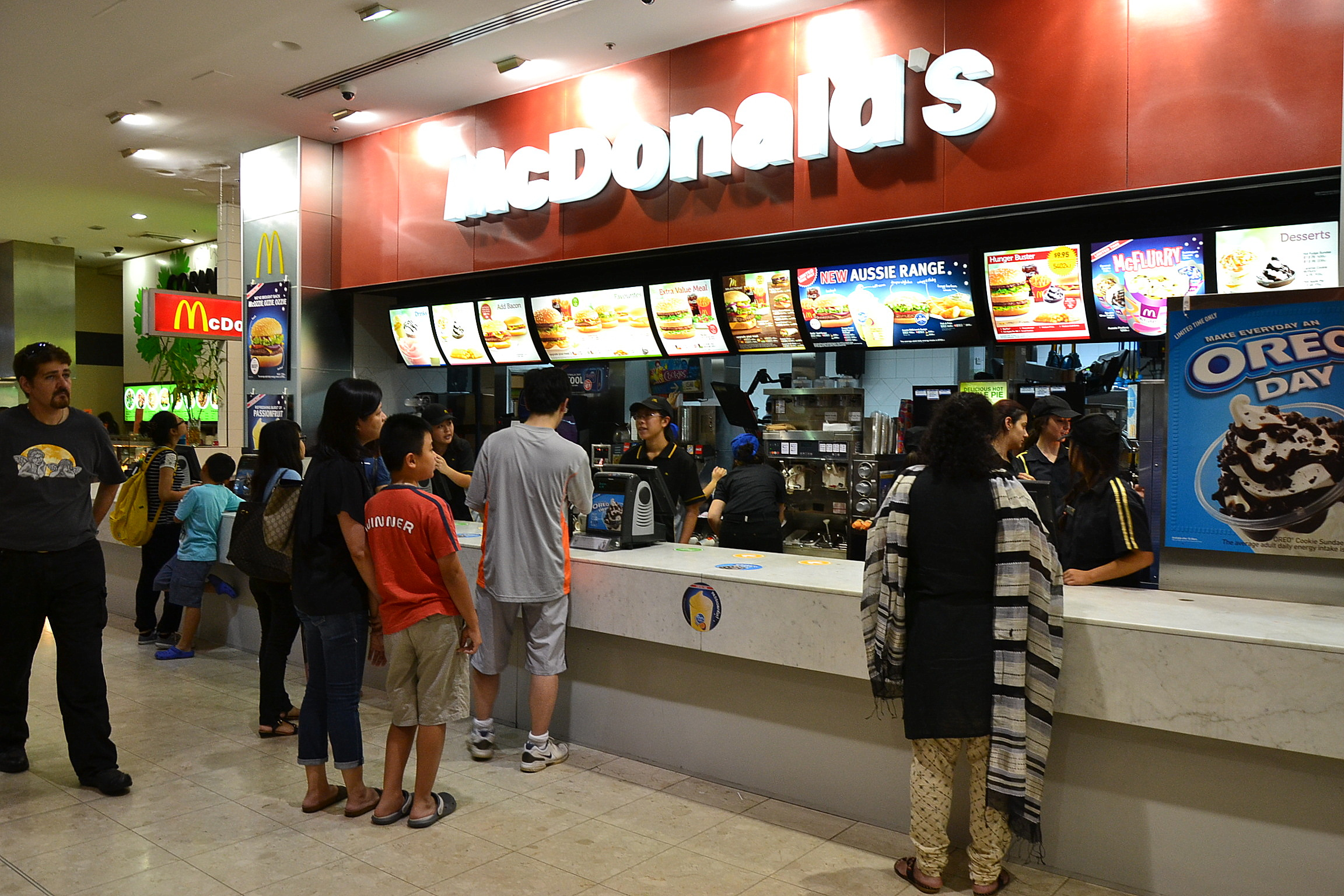
One of the most well-known cross-selling sales scripts comes from McDonald's. "Would you like fries with that?"

Retailers can employ different techniques to enhance sales volume and to improve the customer experience:

=== Add-on, Upsell or Cross-sell. ===
Upselling and cross-selling are sometimes known as suggestive selling. When the consumer has selected their main purchase, sales assistants can try to sell the customer on a premium brand or higher quality item (up-selling) or can suggest complementary purchases (cross-selling). For instance, if a customer purchases a non-stick frypan, the sales assistant might suggest plastic slicers that do not damage the non-stick surface.
Selling on value
Skilled sales assistants find ways to focus on value rather than price. Selling on value often involves identifying a product’s unique features. Adding value to goods or services such as a free gift or buy 1 get 1 free adds value to customers whereas the store is gaining sales
Know when to close the sale
Sales staff must learn to recognise when the customer is ready to make a purchase. If the sales person feels that the customer is ready, then they may seek to gain commitment and close the sale. Experienced sales staff soon learn to recognise specific verbal and non-verbal cues that signal the client's readiness to buy. For instance, if a customer begins to handle the merchandise, this may indicate a state of buyer interest. Clients also tend to employ different types of questions throughout the sales process. General questions such as, "Does it come in any other colours (or styles)?" indicate only a moderate level of interest. However, when clients begin to ask specific questions, such as "Do you have this model in black?" then this often indicates that the prospect is approaching readiness to buy. When the sales person believes that the prospective buyer is ready to make the purchase, a trial close might be used to test the waters. A trial close is simply any attempt to confirm the buyer's interest in finalising the sale. An example of a trial close, is "Would you be requiring our team to install the unit for you?" or "Would you be available to take delivery next Thursday?" If the sales person is unsure about the prospect's readiness to buy, they might consider using a 'trial close.' The salesperson can use several different techniques to close the sale; including the ‘alternative close’, the ‘assumptive close’, the ‘summary close’, or the ‘special-offer close’, among others.

== Promotion ==
In the 1980s, the customary sales concept in the retail industry began to show many disadvantages. Many transactions cost too much, and the industry was unable to retain customers as it only paid attention to the process of a single transaction rather than to marketing for customer development and maintenance. The traditional marketing theory holds that transactions are one-time value exchange processes and the means of exchanging goods needed by both parties. Accordingly, when the transaction is completed, the relationship between the two parties will also end, so the theory is called "transactional marketing". Transactional marketing aims to find target consumers, then negotiate, trade, and finally end relationships to complete the transaction. In this one-time transaction process, both parties aim to maximize their own interests. As a result, transactional marketing raises follow-up problems such as poor after-sales service quality and a lack of feedback channels for both parties. In addition, because retail enterprises needed to redevelop client relationships for each transaction, marketing costs were high and customer retention was low. All these downsides to transactional marketing gradually pushed the retail industry towards establishing long-term cooperative relationships with customers. Through this lens, enterprises began to focus on the process from transaction to relationship. While expanding the sales market and attracting new customers is very important for the retail industry, it is also important to establish and maintain long term good relationships with previous customers, hence the name of the underlying concept, "relational marketing". Under this concept, retail enterprises value and attempt to improve relationships with customers, as customer relationships are conducive to maintaining stability in the current competitive retail market, and are also the future of retail enterprises.

One of the unique aspects of retail promotions is that two brands are often involved; the store brand and the brands that make up the retailer's product range. Retail promotions that focus on the store tend to be ‘image’ oriented, raising awareness of the store and creating a positive attitude towards the store and its services. Retail promotions that focus on the product range, are designed to cultivate a positive attitude to the brands stocked by the store, in order to indirectly encourage favourable attitudes towards the store itself. Some retail advertising and promotion is partially or wholly funded by brands and this is known as co-operative (or co-op) advertising.

Retailers make extensive use of advertising via newspapers, television and radio to encourage store preference. In order to up-sell or cross-sell, retailers also use a variety of in-store sales promotional techniques such as product demonstrations, samples, point-of-purchase displays, free trial, events, promotional packaging and promotional pricing. In grocery retail, shelf wobblers, trolley advertisements, taste tests and recipe cards are also used. Many retailers also use loyalty programs to encourage repeat patronage.

== Presentation ==
See Merchandising; Servicescapes; Retail design

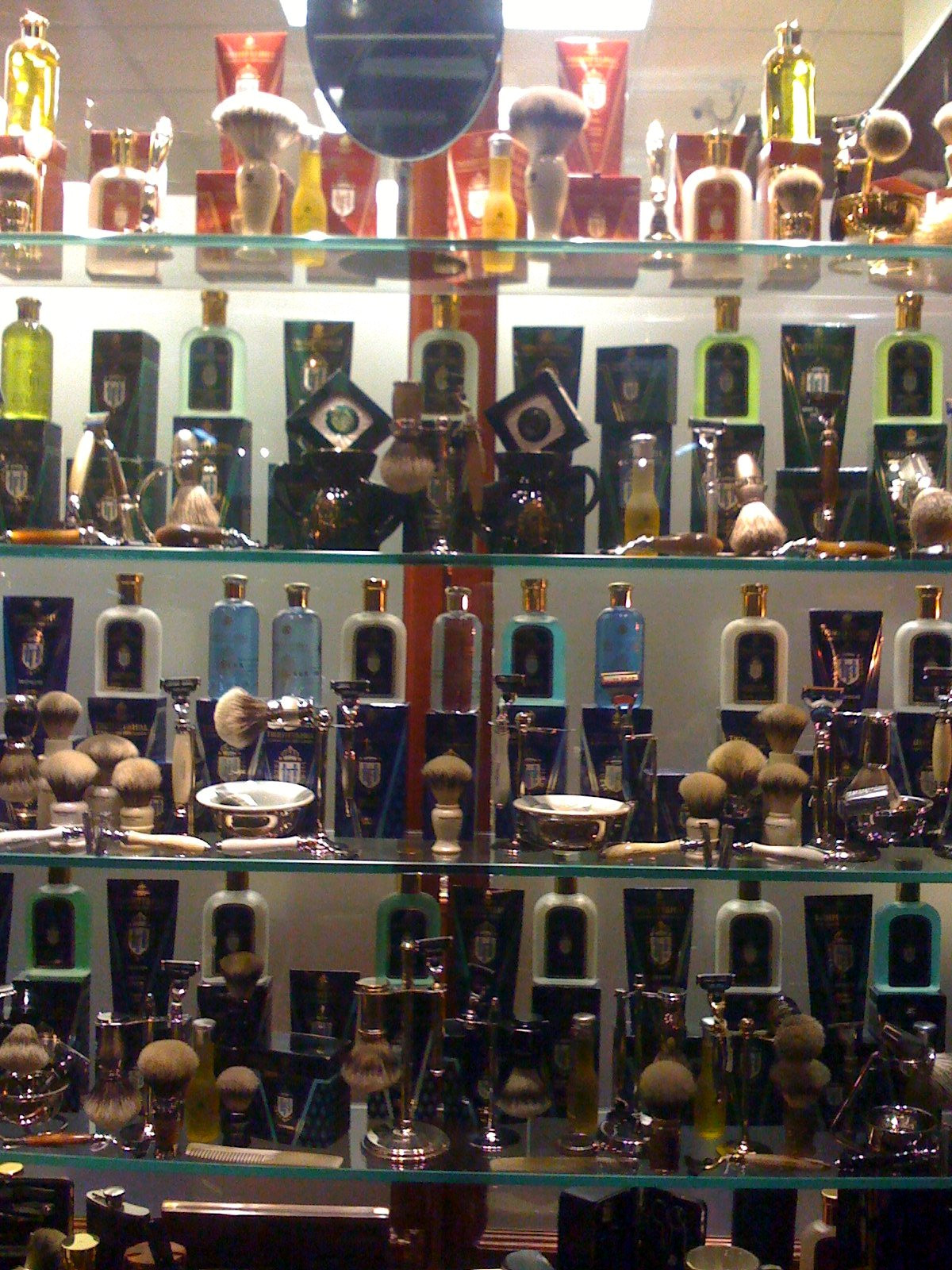
The way that products are displayed is part of the store's presentation.

Presentation refers to the physical evidence that signals the retail image. Physical evidence may include a diverse range of elements – the store itself including premises, offices, exterior facade and interior layout, websites, delivery vans, warehouses, staff uniforms.

=== Designing retail spaces ===
Simplified servicescapes model

The environment in which the retail service encounter occurs is sometimes known as the retail servicescape. The store environment consists of many elements such as smells, the physical environment (furnishings, layout and functionality), ambient conditions (lighting, temperature, noise) as well as signs, symbols and artifacts (e.g. sales promotions, shelf space, sample stations, visual communications). Collectively, these elements contribute to the perceived retail servicescape or the overall atmosphere and can influence both the customer's cognitions, emotions and their behaviour within the retail space.

Relationship between market

Large retail enterprises of relationship marketing refers to a large retail enterprise with suppliers, customers, internal organization, channel distributors, market impact, and other competitors such as the interests of the enterprise marketing process related everything to establish and maintain good relations, thus maximizing the interests of the large retail enterprise in the long-term marketing activities, it was based on the relationship marketing concept as the core of innovation. Different from traditional marketing concepts, relationship marketing focuses on maintaining long-term good relations with relevant parties on marketing activities. The ultimate goal of relationship marketing is tantamount to maximize the long term interests of enterprises.

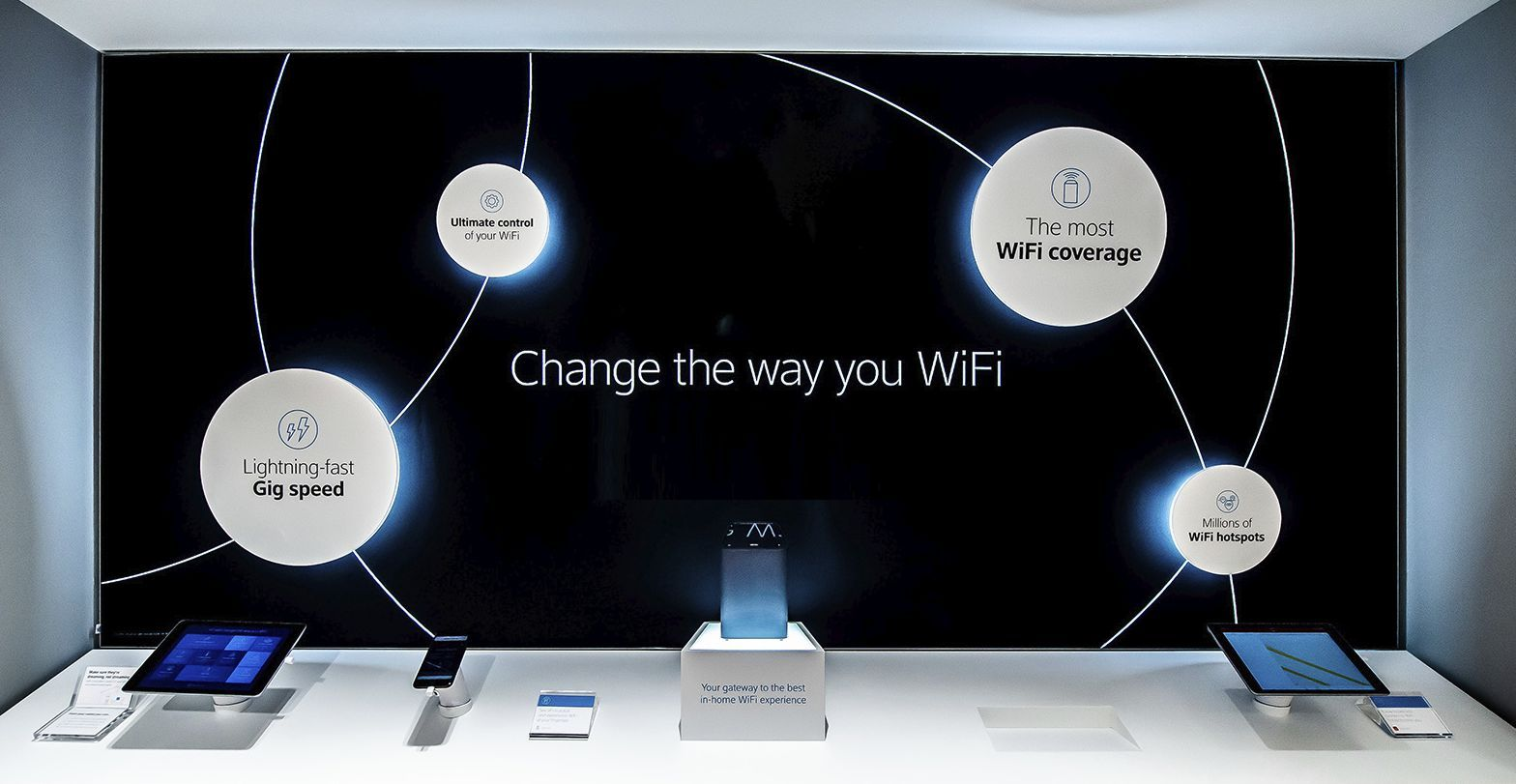
Modern technologies are often displayed in clean environments with much empty space.

The marketing activities of large retail enterprises mainly have six relationship markets, which are supplier relationship market, customer relationship market, enterprise internal relationship market, intermediary relationship market at all levels, enterprise marketing activities influence relationship market and industry competitor relationship market. Among these six relational markets, supply relational market and customer relational market are the two markets that have the greatest influence on the relationship marketing of large retail enterprises. Substantial retail enterprises usually have two sources of profit. The principal source of profit is to reduce the purchase price from suppliers. The other is to develop new customers and keep old clients, so as to expand the market sales of goods. In addition, the extra four related markets have an indirect impact on the marketing activities of large retail enterprises. The internal relationship market of an enterprise can be divided into several different types of relationships according to distinct objects, such as employee relationship market, department relationship market, shareholder relationship market and the mutual relations among the relationship markets. The purpose of carrying out relationship marketing is to promote the cohesion and innovation ability of enterprises and maximize the long term interests of enterprises. Another relationship of relationship marketing middlemen is the relationship between market and intermediary in the process of corporate marketing is playing the intermediary role between suppliers and customers, in the current increasingly fierce market competition, more important distribution channels for enterprises, but for retail enterprises, too much sales levels will increase the cost of sales of the enterprise. Therefore, large retail enterprises should realize the simplification of sales channel level by reasonably selecting suppliers. Large-scale retail enterprises purchasing goods to suppliers with procurement scale advantage, can directly contact with the product manufacturing, with strong bargaining power, therefore, direct contact with the manufacturer is a large retail enterprise to take the main purchasing mode, it is a terminal to the starting point of zero level channel purchasing mode, therefore, the elimination of middlemen, so as to make the large retail enterprise in the marketing activity, the dealer relationship market is not so important. Then there is the enterprise influence relationship market, which is a relational marketing influence in the enterprise supply chain. It mainly guides and standardizes the advance direction of enterprises through formulating systems at the macro level. The relationship market mainly includes the relationship between the relevant government departments at all levels where the enterprise is located, the relationship with the industry association to which the enterprise belongs, and the relationship with all kinds of public organizations, etc., and the enterprise influence itself cannot directly affect the marketing activities of the enterprise. The final relational market is the industry's competitors, potential competitors, alternative competitors and so on. How to correctly deal with the relationship between competitors and the market has become a problem that large retail enterprises need to solve.

Retail designers pay close attention to the front of the store, which is known as the decompression zone. This is usually an open space in the entrance of the store to allow customers to adjust to their new environment. An open-plan floor design is effective in retail as it allows customers to see everything. In terms of the store's exterior, the side of the road cars normally travel, determines the way stores direct customers. New Zealand retail stores, for instance, would direct customers to the left.

In order to maximise the number of selling opportunities, retailers generally want customers to spend more time in a retail store. However, this must be balanced against customer expectations surrounding convenience, access and realistic waiting times. The overall aim of designing a retail environment is to have customers enter the store, and explore the totality of the physical environment engaging in a variety of retail experiences – from browsing through to sampling and ultimately to purchasing. The retail service environment plays an important role in affecting the customer's perceptions of the retail experience.

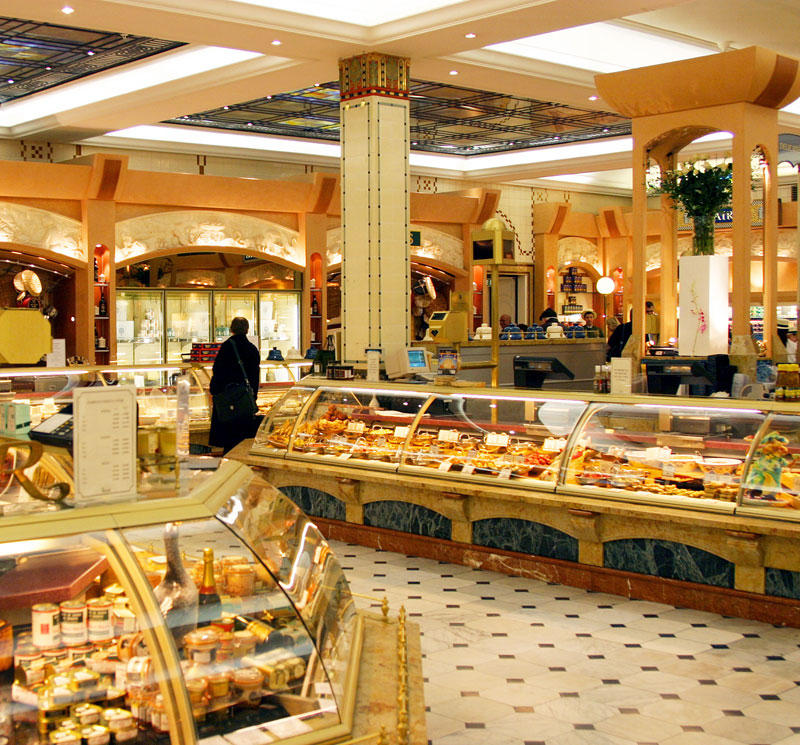
The retail servicescape includes the appearance, equipment, display space, retail counters, signage, layout and functionality of a retail outlet. Pictured: Harrods food court

The retail environment not only affects quality perceptions, but can also impact on the way that customers navigate their way through the retail space during the retail service encounter. Layout, directional signage, the placement of furniture, shelves and display space along with the store's ambient conditions all affect patron's passage through the retail service system. Layout refers to how equipment, shelves and other furnishings are placed and the relationship between them. In a retail setting, accessibility is an important aspect of layout. For example, the grid layout used by supermarkets with long aisles and gondolas at the end displaying premium merchandise or promotional items, minimises the time customers spend in the environment and makes productive use of available space. The gondola, so favoured by supermarkets, is an example of a retail design feature known as a merchandise outpost and which refers to special displays, typically at or near the end of an aisle, whose purpose is to stimulate impulse purchasing or to complement other products in the vicinity. For example, the meat cabinet at the supermarket might use a merchandise outpost to suggest a range of marinades or spice rubs to complement particular cuts of meat. As a generalisation, merchandise outposts are updated regularly so that they maintain a sense of novelty.

According to Ziethaml et al., layout affects how easy or difficult it is to navigate through a system. Signs and symbols provide cues for directional navigation and also inform about appropriate behaviour within a store. Functionality refers to extent to which the equipment and layout meet the goals of the customer. For instance, in the case of supermarkets, the customer's goal may be to minimise the amount of time spent finding items and waiting at the check-out, while a customer in a retail mall may wish to spend more time exploring the range of stores and merchandise. With respect to functionality of layout, retail designers consider three key issues; circulation – design for traffic-flow and that encourages customers to traverse the entire store; coordination – design that combines goods and spaces in order to suggest customer needs and convenience – design that arranges items to create a degree of comfort and access for both customers and employees.

The way that brands are displayed is also part of the overall retail design. Where a product is placed on the shelves has implications for purchase likelihood as a result of visibility and access. Products placed too high or too low on the shelves may not turn over as quickly as those placed at eye level. With respect to access, store designers are increasingly giving consideration to access for disabled and elderly customers.

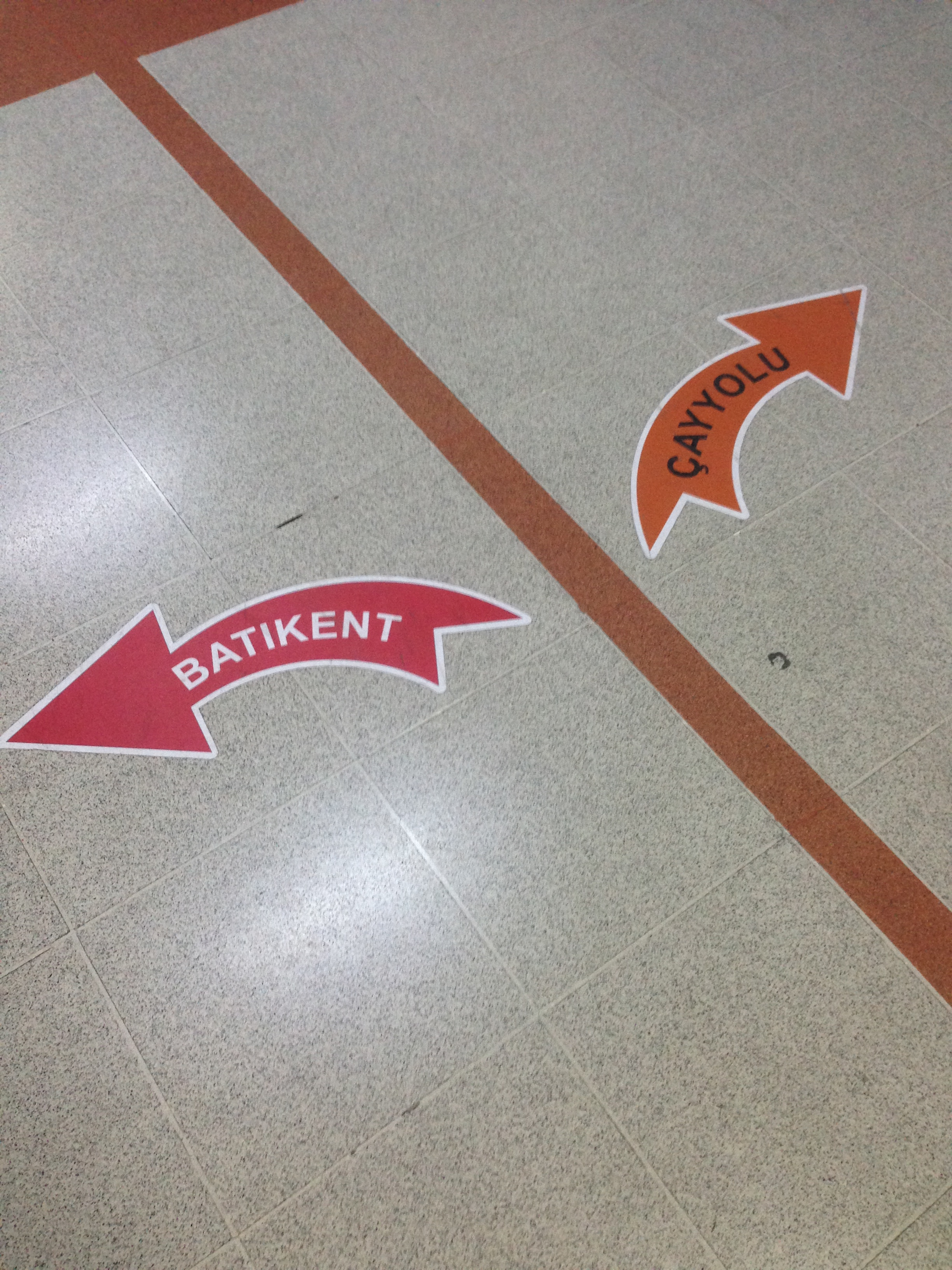
Navigational floor signs are commonly used in complex environments such as shopping malls and department stores.

Through sensory stimulation retailers can engage maximum emotional impact between a brand and its consumers by relating to both profiles; the goal and experience. Purchasing behaviour can be influenced through the physical evidence detected by the senses of touch, smell, sight, taste and sound. Supermarkets offer taste testers to heighten the sensory experience of brands. Coffee shops allow the aroma of coffee to waft into streets so that passers-by can appreciate the smell and perhaps be lured inside. Clothing garments are placed at arms' reach, allowing customers to feel the different textures of clothing. Retailers understand that when customers interact with products or handle the merchandise, they are more likely to make a purchase.

Within the retail environment, different spaces may be designed for different purposes. Hard floors, such as wooden floors, used in public areas, contrast with carpeted fitting rooms, which are designed to create a sense of homeliness when trying on garments. Peter Alexander, retailer of sleep ware, is renowned for using scented candles in retail stores.

Ambient conditions, such as lighting, temperature and music, are also part of the overall retail environment. It is common for a retail store to play music that relates to their target market. Studies have found that "positively valenced music will stimulate more thoughts and feeling than negatively valenced music", hence, positively valenced music will make the waiting time feel longer to the customer than negatively valenced music. In a retail store, for example, changing the background music to a quicker tempo may influence the consumer to move through the space at a quicker pace, thereby improving traffic flow. Evidence also suggests that playing music reduces the negative effects of waiting since it serves as a distraction. Jewellery stores like Michael Hill have dim lighting with a view to fostering a sense of intimacy.

The design of a retail store is critical when appealing to the intended market, as this is where first impressions are made. The overall servicescape can influence a consumer's perception of the quality of the store, communicating value in visual and symbolic ways. Certain techniques are used to create a consumer brand experience, which in the long run drives store loyalty.

== See also ==
- Product management
- Promotion mix
- Marketing mix
- Price
- Servicescape
- Retail design
- Inshop Branding
