= Value-based pricing =

Pricing strategy based on the estimated value

Value-based price, also called value-optimized pricing or charging what the market will bear, is a market-driven pricing strategy which sets the price of a good or service according to its perceived or estimated value. The value that a consumer gives to a good or service, can then be defined as their willingness to pay for it (in monetary terms) or the amount of time and resources they would be willing to give up for it. For example, a painting may be priced at a higher cost than the price of a canvas and paints. If set using the value-based approach, its price will reflect factors such as age, cultural significance, and, most importantly, how much benefit the buyer is deriving. Owning an original Dalí or Picasso painting elevates the self-esteem of the buyer and hence elevates the perceived benefits of ownership.

== How it works ==
Within the strategy of value-based pricing, the price is not dependent on its cost of production, but instead, it is set with consideration upon the consumers perceived value and willingness to pay for the good or service. This pricing strategy should have an even power balance between the seller and the buyer, maintain a long-term and service-based exchange and prioritise a strong relationship with consumers. When adopting the value-based pricing strategy, the price is set to reflect the product or services benefit, meet the company's marketing and financial goals and additionally, consider any competitors' pricing that could influence a consumers preference.

Within this method, value is considered a crucial driving force for every business decision, as ultimately, value determines the price the potential customers are willing to pay for the added benefits received. Profitability of this method stems from its ability to eliminate potential customers who are driven only by price and attract new value-oriented customers from competitors. For example, Starbucks raised prices to maximize profits from price insensitive customers who value gourmet coffee, while losing consumers who seek cheaper prices.

=== Characteristics of value-based pricing ===
A business looking to adopt a value-based pricing strategy must ensure that its product or service offering has certain qualities. Furthermore, it must possess the following:

1. A distinct uniqueness, able to differentiate itself from competitors.
2. A product that is consumer-oriented (that any-to-all adjustments to the product is based solely on consumers wants and needs).
3. A high quality standard (associated with high value to a consumer).

Additionally, the business must prioritise having open communication channels with its customers, to ensure feedback is frequently taken into consideration and the business can further identify the attributes consumers want and their respective willingness to pay.

=== When is value-based pricing most successful? ===
Businesses using this strategy are most successful when a product or service:

- Is associated with a brand that has a powerful and likeable brand image (i.e., designer fashion brands)
- Is competing within a niche market
- Is operating where there are product shortages (i.e., an ice-cream pop-up shop at an outdoor festival)
- Is a complementary good (i.e., movies and popcorn)

=== Types of value-based pricing ===
Andrew Bloomenthal refers to two types of value-based pricing, "good value pricing" and "value-added pricing". Good value pricing means that the product or service is priced in relation to its quality, while value-added pricing refers to the price given to a product or service in relation to the perceived value it adds for the consumer.

== Versus cost-based pricing ==
To completely grasp the concept of value-based pricing, it can be compared with the alternative pricing method of cost-based pricing.

=== Cost-based pricing ===
Cost-based pricing is applied through setting the price of a product or good based on its production and delivery cost with a certain target margin. This method shows an emphasis for cost recovery and profit maximisation which tends to result in lower prices in commodities and/or lower quality of goods.

This method can be utilized successfully by a business when the following circumstances exist:

- The firm is a monopoly or has a capable level of control over the pricing market.
- There is not an ease of access for customers to reach other sources of similar products or services.
- There is no set or standard price that exists in the surrounding market.
- There is a high and growing demand in the market for the product/service.
- Customer loyalty is not a priority.

If the above circumstances do exist a firm can profit very heavily off of cost-based pricing due to the high profit margin created. This can be considered more short term as many of the factors above can change such as customer purchasing power.

=== Comparison to cost-based pricing ===
Choosing a pricing approach to assist a business in achieving a profit is a difficult decision, however, can be made easier when considering their goals and objectives. The cost-based approach is useful as it is easy to calculate and can guarantee that the firm will cover costs of production. Conversely, this method fails to recognise consumer and competition perspectives, the overall business environment and positioning of product. Businesses using this approach simply define their price in relation to internal costs and abilities, thus, potentially missing profit making opportunities or building customer retention. However, value-based pricing takes these factors into consideration and assists businesses in understanding what consumers value and what they are willing to pay.

== Disadvantages ==
Value-based pricing presents many challenges regarding its implementation into a businesses marketing environment. The main obstacles identified for successful implementation of value-based pricing is:

1. Difficulties in understanding the specifics of what consumers value and how these values can change over time.
2. Challenges in influencing what consumers value.
3. Trouble communicating and quantifying value within a buyer-seller relationship.
4. Difficulties in gaining a margin of the value formulated in industrial exchange.
5. Requires substantial resources and time to receive customer feedback and analytical data.

== Implementation ==
=== Resolving competing objectives ===
The conceptualization of sales strategy (Panagopoulos and Avlonitis, 2010) is an essential for companies to sell in a more strategic way rather than operationally selling their products. However, the focus of B2B (business-to-business) pricing method has transformed into the concept of appreciating and raising the value of a product in a market, such as value creation and value capture (Aspara and Tikkanen, 2013). One of the reasons for some companies not applying value-based pricing is that they do not know their own advantages and capabilities. Next, the objectives of the company are not aligned. It is a typical conflict of objectives in companies is market share versus profitability, because in a business tradition, the higher your market share, the more profitable the company is. Hence, to implement value-based pricing into a company, the company has to understand its objective and the advantages that stand out among the competitors in the same field. Thus, this will provide a benefit of dominating the targeted market for the company, hence, sustaining the segmented customers that the company is targeting.

=== Understanding customer segmentation ===
There are many ways of approaching value-based pricing. However, segmentation between companies decides and affects which market segment the company is attracting or aiming for. Generally driving segments, there are customers who just go for the lowest price product, or value buyers who are willing to pay more to purchase products that are worth the price. Thus, value–based pricing companies are aiming for types of segmentation like value buyers. In reality, each and every product in the market is sold at different prices, for more or less similar products. However, selling the same product at different prices is often illegal, because it is regarded as price discrimination or treated as unfair. For example, if customer A and customer B purchased the same item but charged at different prices, this is perceived as unfair. Hence, two of the strategies to go around the market and still to charge more from one segment than another are price fencing and versioning. Price fences are criteria which customers must meet if they are to qualify for a lower price e.g., fencing price buyers from convenience buyers by offering a lower price to shoppers who use coupons found in local newspapers. A convenience buyer only goes to a store and purchase the product they want to get in full price. However, price buyer wants a low price, so they would clip out the coupon they got from the newspaper and redeem the coupon in the department store for a discount. Thus, fencing and versioning are just the ways of how we can address different segments with the willingness to pay at different price point. By capturing the willingness to pay from price buyers with a low-end offering, and at the same also segmenting convenience buyer. Thus, companies are able to charge a much higher price in convenience buyer segment, so profit increases by serving different segments in different price points.

=== Using pricing as pain management ===
However, coupons cannot be given out blindly before understanding which customers are willing to pay more when buying in large quantities. Periodically, some marketers have eliminated their competitors by driving down cost or developing upsetting technologies (Paranikas, Whiteford, Tevelson and Belz, 2015). Thus, market has been segmented out to set up different levels of discounts. Although market has a list price but no one ever pays the full list price, in fact, price negotiation turns into discount negotiation. For instance, the biggest challenge faced by market nowadays is giving too many discounts without getting anything in return. This proven that pricing is often a pain management, where when customer ask for discount or to purchase a product in lower price, customers have to give something back in return to get lower price or discounts. Hence, every discount should have a pain associated with it, because if customers do not suffer from the pain for asking to get a discount, they will just ask for more discounts.

=== Understanding price negotiation and fear ===
Price management and price psychology are related to each other. Companies often transform from a sole entrepreneur into a large company with multibillion-dollar contracts at stake, subject to both price anxiety and on the other hand price confidence. For example, when the buyer knows that the seller will win a deal at any cost, the seller will get it at any cost, meaning that the price will go down. Thus, in another way, the moment when the seller fears a price negotiation and on the other side there is an experienced buyer, the price will go down. It is often said that fear is the most expensive feeling in a company. Additionally, it is often seen that companies, salespersons, entrepreneurs, or freelancers are anxious to lose a deal when customer just takes the price down. Pricing confidence is an essential organizational characteristic which allows teams to sell the product confidently and believe in the price-worthy value of the product (Liozu et al., 2011). Therefore, it is important that companies build up pricing confidence in a team, showing the team a better insight, creating more value from the product. Furthermore, this leads to price confidence that leads from the confidence a seller has in the product they are selling. However, when the seller is not confident about the price or product they are selling, help from others to access your product that has the value for the price is possible as well, and this leads to commodization. Commodization happens when the product a seller offer is as good or as bad as the competitor is offering. In these scenarios, the seller will find it difficult to sell the product at a higher price. Customers often use commodization to drive down the price of a product during a negotiation. Thus, it is valuable to the seller to convince the buyer that the product is not a commodity when you understand the value and that the price of the product is justified.

=== Addressing the mindset change ===
Value-based pricing is as much about a change in mindset as it is about the underlying mechanics of establishing a price and the sales skills needed to achieve that price in the market. The most important first step in value-based pricing is to address this mindset change so that the entire commercial organization begins to think about selling value instead of simply selling a product.

One approach is for companies to conduct a cross-functional workshop that involves the product, marketing, sales, and customer service teams to build a company-specific view of value-based pricing. Once this common definition is established, companies can then quantify value and establish the value-based price.

== See also ==
- Demand-based pricing
- Dynamic pricing
- Fuel pricing software
- Premium pricing or Price premium
- Pricing
- Pricing science
- Pricing strategies
- Relationship-based pricing
- Time-based pricing
- Value-based purchasing
