= Supervisory board =

Superior corporate board in a two-tier board system

In corporate governance, a governance board also known as council of delegates are chosen by the stockholders of a company to promote their interests through the governance of the company and to hire and fire the board of directors.

In civil service, a supervisory board or regulatory board is often a legislatively independent body with authority over other non-governmental boards (i.e. boards embedded within and run by industry bodies), such as found in some systems of regulated marketing, especially in the agricultural sector. The scope of supervision is to supervise other supervisory bodies. Industry boards are typically oriented toward their own stakeholders, while the second-instance supervision takes a broader view of all stakeholders, including the public interest.

Corporate governance varies between countries, especially regarding the board system. There are countries that have a one-tier board system (like the U.S.) and there are others that have a two-tier board system like Germany and the majority of the European countries.

In a one-tier board, all the directors (both executive directors as well as non-executive directors) form one board, called the board of directors.

In a two-tier board there is a separate management board i.e., board of directors (all executive directors and all non-executive directors) and a separate governance board i.e. council of delegates (all executive delegates and all non executive delegates). The council of delegates representing the governance board is the equivalent of the management board i.e. board of directors of a single-tier board, while the chairman of the management board is reckoned as the company's chief executive officer and managing director. These 03 positions are held by the same individual.

In the U.S., within one body, the board of directors, there are people from both inside and outside the company. The board of directors can also easily bring in other members from outside.

In Europe, the governing body is overwhelmingly made up of directors of the company or the controlling holding company.

The controlling body, by contrast, is usually made up of the largest shareholders, representatives of ordinary employees (often elected by unions), outside experts or politicians. The control body is essentially a representative of the general assembly between general assembly meetings. The control body does not interfere in the day-to-day running of the company, meets less frequently, but is able, depending on the legislation in question, to intervene in the proceedings of the governing body or even dissolve it.

== China ==
Mainland China uses a two-tier board system: In China's corporation law, it stipulates a limited liability company (有限责任公司) to have: a board of directors (董事会) and a board of supervisors (监事会). Regarding the Chinese requirements of a board of supervisors, under Articles 52 to 57 of the Company Law of the People's Republic of China:

- A limited liability company requires to set up a board of supervisors, which shall comprise at least 3 persons. A limited liability company, which has relatively less shareholders or is relatively small in scale, may have 1 or 2 supervisors, and does not have to establish a board of supervisors. The board of supervisors shall include representatives of shareholders and representatives of the employees of the company at an appropriate ratio which shall be specifically stipulated in the Articles of Association. The employees' representatives, who are to serve as members of the board of supervisors, shall be democratically elected by the employees of the company through the meeting of the employees' representatives or employees' meeting, or by any other means. The board of supervisors shall have one chairman, who shall be elected by half or more of all the supervisors. The chairman of the board of supervisors shall convene and preside over the meetings of the board of supervisors. If the chairman of the board of supervisors is unable to or does not perform his duties, the supervisor recommended by half or more of the supervisors shall convene and preside over the meetings of the board of supervisors. No director or senior manager may concurrently work as a supervisor.
- Every term of office of the supervisors shall be 3 years. The supervisors may, after the expiry of their term of office, hold a consecutive term upon re-election. If no reelection is timely carried out after the expiry of the term of office of the supervisors, or the number of the members of the board of supervisors is less than the quorum due to the resignation of some directors from the board of supervisors prior to the expiry of their term of office, the original supervisors shall, before the newly elected supervisors assume their posts, exercise the authorities of the supervisors according to laws, administrative regulations as well as the articles of association.
- The board of supervisors or supervisor of a company with no board of supervisors may exercise the following authorities: (1) checking the financial affairs of the company; (2) supervising the duty-related acts of the directors and senior managers, and bringing forward proposals on the removal of any director or senior manager who violates any law, administrative regulation, the articles of association or any resolution of the shareholders' meeting; (3) demanding any director or senior manager to make corrections if his act has injured the interests of the company; (4) proposing to convening temporary shareholders' meetings, and convening and presiding over shareholders' meetings when the board of directors does not exercise the functions of convening and presiding over the shareholders' meetings as prescribed in this Law; (5) bringing forward proposals at shareholders' meetings; (6) initiating actions against directors or senior managers according to other relevant Article of this Law; and (7) other duties as prescribed by the Articles of Association.
- The supervisors may attend the meetings of the board of directors as non-voting delegates, and may raise questions or suggestions on the matters to be decided by the board of directors. If the board of supervisors or supervisor of the company with no board of directors finds that the company is running abnormally, it (he) may make investigations. Where necessary, it (he) may hire an accounting firm to help it (him), with the relevant expenses being borne by the company.
- The board of supervisors shall hold meetings at least once a year. The supervisors may propose to hold temporary meetings of the board of supervisors. The discussion methods and voting procedures of the board of supervisors shall be prescribed in the articles of association, unless it is otherwise stimulated in this Law. The resolution of the board of supervisors shall be adopted by half or more of the supervisors. The board of supervisors shall make records for the resolutions on the matter it discusses, which shall be signed by the supervisors in presence.
- The expenses necessary for the board of supervisors or the supervisor of a company with no board of supervisors to perform its (his) duties shall be borne by the company.

== Germany ==
German corporation law, the Aktiengesetz, requires all public companies (Aktiengesellschaften) to have two boards: a management board called a Vorstand and a supervisory board called an Aufsichtsrat. The supervisory board oversees and appoints the members of the management board and must approve major business decisions.

For German companies with more than 2,000 employees, half of the members of the supervisory board are elected by the employees. When a German company has 500–2,000 employees, the workers select one-third of the supervisory board.

When it comes to internal elections the chairman of the supervisory board, the Aufsichtsratsvorsitzender, has two votes in case of a draw.

The supervisory board, in theory, is intended to provide a monitoring role. However, the appointment of supervisory board members has not been a transparent process and has therefore led to inefficient monitoring and poor corporate governance in some cases (Monks and Minow, 2001). The discussion about whether a one-tier or a two-tier board system leads to better corporate governance is ongoing in Germany and many other countries.

== Poland ==
In Poland rules regarding supervisory boards in companies are regulated in Code of Commercial Companies. In limited liability company (sp. z o.o.), the appointment of the Supervisory Board is mandatory only if the company’s share capital exceeds 500,000 PLN and the number of shareholders exceeds twenty-five. In joint stock company (S.A.), the appointment of the Supervisory Board is mandatory regardless of the share capital, size, and the number of shareholders. The competences of the Supervisory Board are broad and include both the oversight of the management board’s activities and the performance of specific control tasks. Unless otherwise regulated in the Articles of Association members of Supervisory Board are appointed by Shareholders Meeting.
