= Zafin =

Banking software

- Type: Private
- Industry: Banking Software
- Founded: 2002; 24 years ago
- Headquarters: Toronto, Ontario, Canada
- Products: miRevenue
- Services: Relationship-based pricing
- Website: www.zafin.com

Zafin is a banking software enterprise platform company that provides relationship-based pricing to banks and financial institutions.

The company has offices in Canada, USA, UK, Germany, United Arab Emirates, India, Malaysia, and South Africa.

== History ==
The company is founded and led by Karim Somji in 2002.

In March 2020, Zafin announced the appointment of Venkataraman Balasubramanian to its senior leadership team as executive vice president and chief technology officer.

In early 2022, Zafin purchased Surrey, B.C.-based FinancialCAD Corp. (Fincad), a provider of derivatives valuation software, for $32.7 million USD. However, instead of integrating Fincad into its own platform, Zafin sold the business to New York-based financial analytics provider Numerix LLC in April 2023 for an undisclosed amount.

Nordic Capital has acquired a majority stake in Zafin. As part of the transaction, long-time investors Beedie Capital, Kayne Partners, and Vistara Growth have sold their stakes in the company. Beedie Capital first invested in Zafin in 2012, followed by Kayne Partners in 2014 and Vistara Growth in 2018.

== Clients ==
The company's clients include banks and financial institutions such as Standard Chartered Bank, Bank of the West, CIMB, ZKB, Nedbank, HDFC Bank, National Bank of Abu Dhabi, and SEB.

== Awards ==
Zafin won a Technology Award in 2007, courtesy of The Banker magazine, for Best Implementation in the Retail Banking Project category. The award represented the first implementation of miRevenue in a bank and was awarded for the retail banking implementation at HDFC Bank.

Zafin was recognized as one of the "Top 10 FinTech Companies to Watch" by American Banker in 2013.

Zafin was listed on the Deloitte Fast 50 and Deloitte Fast 500 lists in 2014. The company experienced 865% revenue growth over the previous five-year period

== Projects ==
Zafin completed a customized pricing system for ZKB in 2008. The complexity of the integration, which resulted in allowing ZKB to perform relationship-based pricing for large customers in real time, was featured in an academic text, "Management von Integrationsprojekten: Konzeptionelle Grundlagen und Fallstudien aus fachlicher und IT-Sicht", edited by Dr. Robert Winter of the University of St. Gallen.

In October 2017, the company launched new fintech partner ecosystem to assist the banks with a one-stop origination platform.
