= Relationship-based pricing =

Dynamic pricing system in the banking industry

Relationship-based pricing (RBP) is a pricing and billing framework in the banking industry where pricing is determined based on a customer's overall purchases and circumstances, rather than being delivered on a product-by-product basis. With RBP, banks use customer-based parameters, such as the level of overall business the customer does with a bank or the types of services purchased, to determine pricing.

Financial services industry analysts like Celent and TowerGroup endorse relationship-based pricing to improve profitability.

RBP billing products include ORMB from Oracle Corporation, miRevenue from Zafin and Product & Pricing Catalog from Amdocs.

== Implementation ==
In 2013, California-based Bank of the West began an RBP project using Zafin Labs software

== See also ==
- Demand-based pricing
- Dynamic pricing
- Premium pricing or Price premium
- Pricing
- Pricing science
- Pricing strategy
- Time-based pricing
- Value pricing or Value-based purchasing
