= Voluntary exchange =

Voluntary exchange is the act of buyers and sellers freely and willingly engaging in market transactions.

Voluntary exchange is a fundamental assumption in classical economics and neoclassical economics which forms the basis of contemporary mainstream economics. That is, when neoclassical economists theorize about the world, they assume voluntary exchange is taking place. Building on this assumption, neoclassical economics goes on to conclude a variety of important results such as that market activity is efficient, that free trade has net positive effects and that markets in which economic agents participate voluntarily make them better off. Notably, neoclassical economists—based on the assumption of voluntary exchange—deny the Marxist definition of the exploitation of labour as a possibility within neoclassically defined capitalism. Marxian economics, one of the major alternatives to neoclassical economics, contends that the exploitation of labor is both possible with what appears on the surface to be voluntary exchange and a definitional condition of the capitalist mode of production, among other modes of production.

Voluntary exchange is sometimes at the root of arguments about the morality of markets. Market proponents often invoke what they believe is the morality as well as the purported efficiency of voluntary exchange to argue against government mandates, including many forms of taxation. The morality of markets, even those adhering to true voluntary exchange, are nonetheless in dispute. According to Dr Marianne Johnson, there is no theoretical basis for arguing that partially or completely voluntary exchange is preferable to other arrangements such as government mandates.
