= Relative price =

Ratio of two prices

A relative price is the price of a commodity such as a good or service in terms of another; i.e., the ratio of two prices. A relative price may be expressed in terms of a ratio between the prices of any two goods or the ratio between the price of one good and the price of a market basket of goods (a weighted average of the prices of all other goods available in the market).

Microeconomics can be seen as the study of how economic agents react to changes in relative prices, and of how relative prices are affected by the behavior of those agents. The difference and change of relative prices can also reflect the development of productivity.

== In a demand equation ==
In the demand equation $Q=f(P)$ (in which $Q$ is the number of units of a good or service demanded), $P$ is the relative price of the good or service rather than the nominal price. It is the change in a relative price that prompts a change in the quantity demanded. For example, if all prices rise by 10% there is no change in any relative prices, so if consumers' nominal income and wealth also go up by 10% leaving real income and real wealth unchanged, then demand for each good or service will be unaffected. But if the price of a particular good goes up by, say, 2% while the prices of the other goods and services go down enough that the overall price level is unchanged, then the relative price of the particular good has increased while purchasing power has been unaffected, so the quantity of the good demanded will go down.

== Budget constraint and indifference curves ==

In the graphical rendition of the theory of consumer choice, as shown in the accompanying graph, the consumer's choice of the optimal quantities to demand of two goods is the point of tangency between an indifference curve (curved) and the budget constraint (a straight line). The graph shows an initial budget constraint BC1 with resulting choice at tangency point A, and a new budget constraint after a decrease in the absolute price of Y (the good whose quantity is shown horizontally), with resulting choice at tangency point C. In each case the absolute value of the slope of the budget constraint is the ratio of the price of good Y to the price of good X – that is, the relative price of good Y in terms of X.

== Distinguishing relative and general price changes ==
Often inflation makes it difficult for economic agents to immediately distinguish increases in the price of a good which are due to relative price changes from changes in the price which are due to inflation of prices in general. This situation can lead to allocative inefficiency, and is one of the negative effects of inflation. In general, price change means that when the demand for a commodity increases, the price will go up, and when the demand for a commodity decreases, the price will also go down. However, during the period of inflation, the relationship between supply and demand and the change of demand are very special, which requires the judgment of special variation.

== Relative price factors ==
There are many factors affecting relative price, such as the change of employee labor rate, the difference of production supply and the change of government price policy, which can affect the change of relative price among commodities.

Changes in market supply and demand will also cause changes in relative prices, such as changes in social consumption levels and consumer consumption habits. These are all factors that affect relative prices.

== See also ==
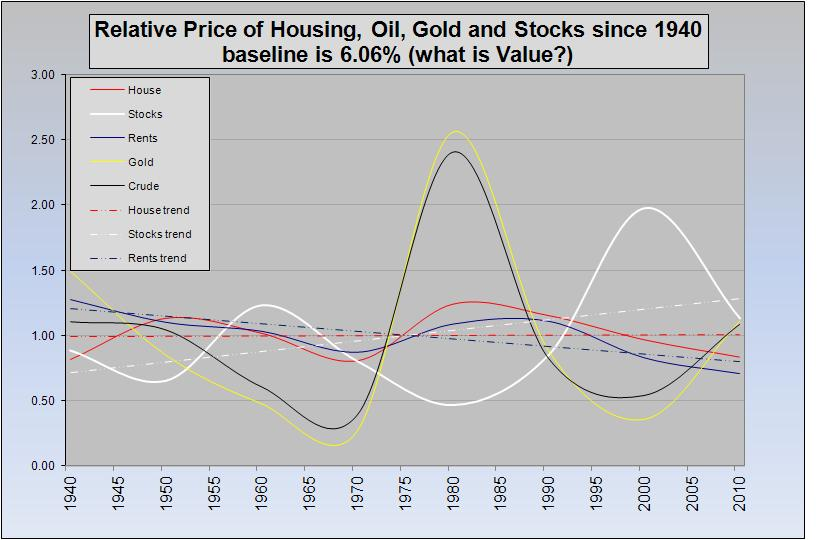
Value or Price

- Price premium
- Relative value (economics)
