= Price signal =

Signal to increase or decrease quantity supplied or quantity demanded

A price signal is information conveyed to consumers and producers, via the prices offered or requested for, and the amount requested or offered of a product or service, which provides a signal to increase or decrease quantity supplied or quantity demanded. It also provides potential business opportunities. When a certain kind of product is in shortage supply and the price rises, people will pay more attention to and produce this kind of product. The information carried by prices is an essential function in the fundamental coordination of an economic system, coordinating things such as what has to be produced, how to produce it and what resources to use in its production.

In mainstream (neoclassical) economics, under perfect competition relative prices signal to producers and consumers what production or consumption decisions will contribute to allocative efficiency. According to Friedrich Hayek, in a system in which the knowledge of the relevant facts is dispersed among many people, prices can act to coordinate the separate actions of different people in the same way as subjective values help the individual to coordinate the parts of his plan.

== Pricing power ==
Alternative theories include that prices reflect relative pricing power of producers and consumers. A monopoly may set prices so as to maximize monopoly profit, while a cartel may engage in price fixing. Conversely, on the consumer side, a monopsony may negotiate or demand prices that do not reflect the cost of production. The pricing power owned by an enterprise reflects the position of its products in the market. In this case, the price signal may no longer be able to affect such products.

== Value ==
A long thread in economics (from Aristotle to classical economics to the present) distinguishes between exchange value, use value, price, and (sometimes) intrinsic value. It is frequently argued that the connection between price and other types of value is not as direct as suggested in the theory of price signals, other considerations playing a part.

== Speculation ==
Financial speculation, particularly buying or selling assets with borrowed money, can move prices away from their economic fundamentals. Credit bubbles can sometimes distort the price signal mechanism, causing large-scale malinvestment and financial crises. Adherents of the Austrian school of economics attribute this phenomenon to the interference of central bankers, which they propose to eliminate by introducing full-reserve banking. By contrast, post-Keynesian economists such as Hyman Minsky have described it as a fundamental flaw of capitalism, corrected by financial regulation. Both schools have been the subject of renewed attention in the Western world since the 2008 financial crisis.

== Price discrimination ==
Firms use price discrimination to increase profits by charging different prices to different consumers or groups of consumers. Price discrimination may be regarded as an unfair practice used to drive out competitors.

== See also ==
- Dynamic pricing
- Pricing power
- Speculation
- Supply and demand
