= Pricing science =

Pricing science is the application of social and business science methods to the problem of setting prices. Methods include economic modeling, statistics, econometrics, and mathematical programming. This discipline had its origins in the development of yield management in the airline industry in the 1980s, and has since spread to many other sectors and pricing contexts, including yield management in other travel industry sectors, media, retail, manufacturing and distribution.

Pricing science work is effectuated in a variety of ways, from strategic advice on pricing on defining segments for which pricing strategies may vary, to enterprise-class software applications, integrated into price quoting and selling processes.

== History ==
Pricing science has its roots in the development of yield management programs developed by the airline industry shortly after deregulation of the industry in the early 1980s. These programs provided model-based support to answer the central question faced by deregulated airlines: "How many bookings should I accept, for each fare product that I offer on each flight departure that I operate, so that I maximize my revenue?" Finding the best answers required developing statistical algorithms to predict the number of booked passengers who would show up and to predict the number of additional bookings to expect for each fare product. It also required developing optimization algorithms and formulations to find the best solution, given the characteristics of the forecasts. And for airlines operating hundreds to thousands of flights every day, and selling tickets for daily departures 300 days into the future, the computational challenges are extreme.

The yield management programs provided dramatic financial benefits to their early adopters in the early- to mid-1980s, and the approach spread rapidly to firms in the related sectors of hotel, rental car, and cruise line industries. While there are important differences between these industries, the dominant drivers of the solutions were the perishable nature of the resource being sold, demand patterns that were time-variable, and the limited capacity available for sale. For a good overview of pricing science methods and applications related to yield or revenue management, see Phillips and the references cited therein. Williams shows the connection between many of these problems and standard micro-economics.

Beginning in the early to mid-1990s, these successes spawned efforts to apply the methods, or develop new methods, to support pricing and related decisions in a variety of other settings. Yield management has been applied successfully to broadcast and cable television, online media, oil and gas producers, sporting and theatrical providers, apartment and timeshare rental properties, credit card, and retail settings.

Since about 2000, the application of pricing science to the problems of quoting prices in business-to-business transactions has taken off, with adopters reporting financial benefits comparable to the earlier gains in the travel industry. Instead of optimizing the offers available in response to very dynamic capacity, these business-to-business applications provided the means to optimize offers based on the particular characteristics of the transaction being contemplated and the customer. Applications have included business services providers, industrial product manufacturers, and distributors of products ranging from technology to food to office supplies.

Even airlines and other early practitioners began to revisit their original assumption that prices were a "given," a simple input to their optimization technology. The growth of low-cost carriers offering restriction-free pricing, "name your own price" channels, and auctions all stimulated this interest in applying science to the pricing side of the business.

As the applications of scientific methods to these business problems expanded, the discipline of pricing science became more rigorous and methodological. Initially, statistical and optimization methods were adapted by practitioners and theoreticians from the engineering and operations research disciplines. The discipline was typically referred to as operations research and specialization in revenue or yield management methods was viewed as a specialty in the larger discipline of Operations Research and Management Science. INFORMS, the professional body of the larger discipline, has a section devoted to this specialty, the Revenue Management and Pricing section.

As the applications spread from yield management to more general pricing applications, the term Pricing Science has become much more common to refer to the discipline and Pricing Scientists to refer to the practitioners.

== Methods ==
The methods employed in pricing science may be categorized into two broad areas: 1. forecasting and 2. optimization. The forecasting problem reflects the fact that the pricing decisions are intended to affect purchase events over some future time horizon. The optimization problem reflects the mathematical complexity required to reach feasible and practical pricing solutions.

=== Forecasting Methods ===
There are two forecasting sub-problems: predicting time-phased demand and predicting demand response to the pricing decisions. In yield management-type applications, predicting time-phased demand, at a very granular level, is central since these applications are characterized by fixed capacity against which demand must be balanced by use of pricing or related controls. In many of these types of applications, predicting response to pricing decisions is also important, since price is often the control instrument used to modulate demand. However, there are a number of yield management applications in which the control is directly on product availability; prices are typically taken as fixed in these cases and prediction of price response is not required.

==== Forecasting time-phased demand ====
Forecasting methods generally fall into the class of methods known as time series methods, primarily exponential smoothing, or causal methods, where price is taken to be (one of) the causal factors. In pricing science applications, it is necessary to produce forecasts of demand at the level of granularity at which pricing decisions are made. This introduces both modeling and computation complexity not addressed in standard treatments of forecasting methods. Also, in cases where capacity constraints are present, methods are required to account for the censoring of demand that occurs when demand exceeds capacity. In cases where bookings are closed because they have reached the maximum authorization, one must estimate what the "true" demand would have been had bookings been accepted during those closed periods.

==== Forecasting granular demand ====
Often, there may be insufficient historical instances of the series of interest to produce a reliable demand forecast. For an airline, this might happen for flights to new markets, where no history is available to reference. For a retailer, it may simply be sparse data on sales of a particular SKU. A widely used method used to produce the necessary forecasts in such cases is sometimes referred to as "aggregate and distribute." This method decomposes the forecast into two components, a forecast of a more aggregated series and a forecast of how that more aggregated demand is distributed across its components, viz:

$Q_{t+n}^{i} = Q_{t+n}^{I} * sI_{t+n}^{i}, i \in I;$

where $i$ is the particular low-level series of interest, $I$ is the aggregate of related series (e.g. all itineraries serving a particular origin-destination, or all sizes and colors of the particular style of shirt), $Q_{t+n}^{I}$ is the forecast of the aggregate, and $sI_{t+n}^{i}$ is the forecast of $i$'s share of $I$. Both $Q_{t+n}^{I}$ and $sI_{t+n}^{i}$ may be produced using standard exponential smoothing methods.

==== Accounting for censoring ====
When the application balances demand against supply through direct control of product availability, as is common in many yield management applications, producing good time-phased forecasts requires either capturing the demand which doesn't result in a sale or booking directly (often referred to as "turndowns" or "loss data"); or using some scientific method to estimate the unobserved demand. Conventionally, these methods are referred to as "unconstraining methods", include manual adjustment, averaging methods, Expectation Maximization (EM) methods, exponential smoothing methods.

==== Causal methods ====
When the application uses prices as the control instrument, setting prices to modulate sales, producing good time-phased forecasts may require using causal methods (sometimes referred to as econometric methods) to account for the relationship between the prices in effect at a point in time and the observed sales at that point in time. In this way, the relationship between price and sales volume, often referred to as the "price response effect," can be used to separate the underlying time-phased demand from the sales effects of price changes. Since the objective of these applications of pricing science is precisely to take best advantage of the sale volume effects of price changes, accounting for these effects can be a significant focus of the scientific work in support of these applications. The problem of identifying and estimating these effects is not trivial since, in addition to the price of a specific product, sales volume is affected by numerous other effects, some of which are under the control of the firm (e.g. advertising, prices of related goods) and other which are outside the control of the firm (e.g. competitors' prices, seasonality). In the domain of pricing science, these methods are typically referred to as Market Response Models.

=== Optimization Methods ===
Given models that provide predictions of future sales volume, either as a function of time or price decisions, the firm has certain choices or decisions available to it. Modeling those choices or decisions as an optimization problem provides a means to select the best available set of choices or decisions. In some settings, solutions to this problem may be provided by heuristic methods; in others, by numerical optimization methods; in others, by strict mathematical methods.

==== Heuristic methods ====
The most well-known (and likely, most broadly applied) heuristic method for a large class of yield management problems is known as the Expected Marginal Seat Revenue (EMSR) algorithm. This heuristic provides a decision rule for allocating inventory for sale at lower prices, as a function of the demand at higher prices and the differences in prices. Phillips ^{[1]} discusses extensions of the EMSR heuristic.

==== Numerical optimization methods ====
Many optimization problems are formulated as constrained or unconstrained mathematical programs, either linear programs (LP) or mixed integer programs (MIP), for which many solution techniques and commercial solvers are available.

==== Strict mathematical methods ====
If the market response model is formulated within a certain class, and point estimates of the model parameters obtained, the optimal solution can be obtained analytically exploiting the special structure of the problem.

== Technology ==
There are a variety of practices by which businesses exploit the methods and results of pricing science to make better pricing decisions, most of which are mediated by technology. One organization of the types of technology is to consider (a) general purpose tools used to implement some Pricing Science techniques; (b) use of localized technology, typically standard office tools, configured to utilize Pricing Science methods; and (c) specialized, enterprise-class software designed and developed for this purpose.

=== Analytic Technology ===
In some businesses, pricing decisions are supported using forecasting and optimization methods executed on an as needed basis using general purpose analytic tools. In this setting, when periodic, or ad hoc decisions are made, analysis of historical transaction data sets is performed. This approach is often seen in large enterprises which have quantitative analysts familiar with the tools and, to various degrees, with Pricing Science methods, or which retain specialized consultants to perform the analysis.

=== Local Technology ===
In many enterprises, the technology used to support pricing and related decisions, using the methods described above, are standard office applications for data management, reporting and analysis. Some very large enterprises have implemented and evolved very elaborate processes of data acquisition and manipulation, using such technology. As the developers and users of these technologies are, for the most part, generalists, there may be frequent issues of quality, reliability and extensibility of such processes.

=== Enterprise Software ===
Since yield management began to take roots in the 1980s, a number of highly specialized enterprise software providers have grown up to meet the needs of businesses that have taken advantage of the margin enhancement opportunities afforded by the methods. The technology provided by such providers have tended to be large-scale applications addressing, to various degrees, not only the scientific methods of pricing but also other execution, work-flow, and reporting requirements that business have. In addition, these providers generally supply specialized expertise in pricing science applications and methods. These software providers fall generally into three classes: those providing technology and expertise related to the yield management problems typically seen in travel and related industries; those providing technology and expertise related to the various pricing problems in the more general retail industry; and those providing technology and expertise related to pricing in B2B commerce.
