= Price premium =

Price premium, or relative price, is the percentage by which a product's selling price exceeds (or falls short of) a benchmark price. Marketers need to monitor price premiums as early indicators of competitive pricing strategies. Changes in price premiums can also be signs of product shortages, excess inventories, or other changes in the relationships between supply and demand. In a survey of nearly 200 senior marketing managers, 54 percent responded that they found the "price premium" metric very useful.

== Purpose ==
Although there are several useful benchmarks with which a manager can compare a brand's price, they all attempt to measure the 'average price' in the marketplace. By comparing a brand's price with a market average, managers can gain valuable insight into its strength, especially if they view these findings in the context of volume and market share changes. Indeed, price premium – also known as relative price – is a commonly used metric among marketers and senior managers. Fully 63% of firms report the relative prices of their products to their boards, according to a recent survey conducted in the US, UK, Germany, Japan, and France.

== Construction ==
Price premium (%) = [Brand A price ($) - Benchmark price ($)] / Benchmark price ($)

In calculating price premium, managers must first specify a benchmark price. Typically, the price of the brand in question will be included in this benchmark, and all prices in the benchmark will be for an equivalent volume of product (for example, price per liter). There are at least four commonly used benchmarks:

=== The price of a specified competitor or competitors ===
This is the simplest calculation of price premium and involves the comparison of a brand’s price to that of a specified direct competitor. When assessing a brand’s price premium vis à vis multiple competitors, managers can use as their benchmark the average price of a selected group of those competitors.

=== Average price paid: The unit-sales weighted average price in the category ===
Another useful benchmark is the average price that customers pay for brands in a given category. This average can be calculated in at least two ways: (1) as the ratio of total category revenue to total category unit sales, or (2) as the unit-share weighted average price in the category. The market Average Price Paid includes the brand under consideration. Changes in unit shares will affect the average price paid. If a low-price brand steals shares from a higher-priced rival, the average price paid will decline. This would cause a firm’s price premium (calculated using the average price paid as a benchmark) to rise, even if its absolute price did not change. Similarly, if a brand is priced at a premium, that premium will decline as it gains share. The reason: a market share gain by a premium-priced brand will cause the overall average price paid in its market to rise. This, in turn, will reduce the price differential between that brand and the market average. To calculate the price premium using the average price paid benchmark, managers can also divide a brand’s share of the market in value terms by its share in volume terms. If value and volume market shares are equal, there is no premium. If value share is greater than volume share, then there is a positive price premium.

=== Average price charged: The simple (unweighted) average price in the category ===
Calculation of the average price paid requires knowledge of the sales or shares of each competitor. A much simpler benchmark is the average price charged – the simple unweighted average price of the brands in the category. This benchmark requires knowledge only of prices. As a consequence, the price premium calculated using this benchmark is not affected by changes in unit shares. For this reason, this benchmark serves a slightly different purpose. It captures the way a brand’s price compares to prices set by its competitors, without regard to customers’ reactions to those prices. It also treats all competitors equally in the calculation of the benchmark price. Large and small competitors are weighted equally when calculating average price charged.

=== Average price displayed: The display-weighted average price in the category ===
One benchmark conceptually situated between average price paid and average price charged is the average price displayed. Marketing managers who seek a benchmark that captures differences in the scale and strength of brands’ distribution might weight each brand’s price in proportion to a numerical measure of distribution. Typical measures of distribution strength include numeric distribution, ACV (%), and PCV (%).

== See also ==
- Premium pricing
- Relative price
