= Regulated market =

Market regulated and/or controlled by the government

A regulated market (RM) or coordinated market is an idealized system where the government or other organizations oversee the market, control the forces of supply and demand, and to some extent regulate the market actions. This can include tasks such as determining who is allowed to enter the market and what prices may be charged. The majority of financial markets such as stock exchanges are regulated, whereas over-the-counter markets are usually not at all or only moderately regulated.

A variety of forms of regulations exist in a regulated market. These include controls, oversights, anti-discrimination, environmental protection, taxation, and labor laws.

In a regulated market, the regulator may legislate regulations that privilege special interests, known as regulatory capture.

== Reasons for regulation ==
One of the reasons for regulation can be the importance of the regulated activity—meaning the harm suffered should the industry fail would be so fatal that regulators (governments, legislators) cannot afford the risk. This includes fields like banking or financial services. Secondly, it is common for some markets to be regulated under the claim that they are natural monopolies, or that a monopoly would very likely appear should there be no regulation. It is crucial to prevent misuse of monopoly power, as this can lead to delivery of poor services with very high prices. This includes for example the telecommunications, water, gas, or electricity supply. Often, regulated markets are established during the partial privatisation of government controlled utility assets.

== Changes in regulation ==
Regulation is subject to changes over time, due to both technological advances as well as the change in attitude towards regulation in general. An example for industries that are no longer regulated is the rail service or airlines in the US. On the other hand, there are also industries that did not need regulation in the past, but are in need of it now. This includes, for example, the real estate market.

Another category is the markets that encountered major changes in regulatory approaches due to various crises. A prime example are stock exchanges following stock market crashes.

The practice of regulating markets dates back centuries when ancient societies relied on standardised weights and measurements and practiced punishment for theft and fraud. For the most part, market regulations have been imposed by the central governments and, to a lesser extent, by interest groups. One notable example of such interest groups is medieval guilds. They were often either craft guilds or merchant guilds, and controlled the practice of their profession in their particular area. Guilds defined requirements for practicing their profession, which usually meant that only guild members could practice their profession or sell their goods within their city. Since the beginning of the 20th century, labour groups at times have had regulatory roles in some markets.

== Reception ==
Regulation is considered a polarising issue. Those in favour of regulating usually see it as beneficial to the wider society, for example, regulations targeting ecological, racial, or religion-related issues. Those against regulation see it as a tool for lobbying or as a source for creating unfair competition. Some advocates of the free market generally see any regulation except for the most essential ones as costly and inefficient.

== Examples of regulatory bodies ==
- Food and Drug Administration (FDA)
- Securities and Exchange Commission (SEC)
- Environmental Protection Agency (EPA)

== See also ==
- Better Regulation Commission
- Bureaucracy
- Code of Federal Regulations
- Deregulation
- European Union directive
- European Union regulation
- Free market
- Mixed economy
