= List of socialist economists =

This article lists notable socialist economists and political economists.

== Classical economists ==
- Ferdinand Lassalle
- John Stuart Mill (later work)

=== Ricardian economists ===
- John Francis Bray
- John Gray
- Charles Hall
- Thomas Hodgskin

=== Utopian socialists ===
- Charles Fourier
- Robert Owen
- Saint-Simon

== Anarchist economists ==
- Mikhail Bakunin
- Joseph Proudhon
- Benjamin Tucker

== Marxian economists ==
- Paul Cockshott
- James Connolly
- Friedrich Engels
- Rudolf Hilferding
- Andrew Kliman
- János Kornai
- Rosa Luxemburg
- Ernest Mandel
- Karl Marx
- Antonie Pannekoek
- Karl Polanyi
- Robert Rowthorn
- Richard D. Wolff
- Michael Hudson
- Yanis Varoufakis
- Kshama Sawant
- Stephen Resnick

=== Marxian-Sraffian ===
- David Laibman
- Nobuo Okishio
- John Roemer
- Anwar Shaikh
- Piero Sraffa
- Ian Steedman
- Paul Sweezy

=== Cooperative economics ===
- Michael Albert
- Pat Devine
- Robin Hahnel
- Noreena Hertz
- Branko Horvat
- Edvard Kardelj
- David Schweickart
- Jaroslav Vanek

== Neoclassical economists ==
- Enrico Barone
- Ellora Derenoncourt
- Oskar Lange
- Abba Lerner
- Alfred Marshall
- Alec Nove
- Andreas G. Papandreou
- Mark Paul
- Fred M. Taylor
- Thomas Piketty
- Robert Pollin
- Léon Walras
- Gabriel Zucman

== Institutional economists ==
- Thorstein Veblen

== See also ==
- Classical economics
- List of economists
- Marxian economics
- Production for use
