= Facilitation board =

Key feature of parecon; decentralized economic planning apparatus

A facilitation board is a proposed economic institution conceived by economists Michael Albert and Robin Hahnel which act in systems of economic democracy as agencies that facilitate information exchange and processing for collective consumption proposals and for large-scale investment projects, workers requests for changing places of employment, and individuals and families seeking to find membership in living units and neighborhoods, among other functions.

The proposed boards form part of the process of participatory planning within Albert and Hahnel's economic system of participatory economics and Participism. If adopted, they would serve to manage and coordinate proposals by workers and consumers in place of a central state or markets.

== Description ==
Iteration Facilitation Boards (IFBs) act as management bodies in participatory economics and perhaps other similar systems for local consumer and worker councils and are the mechanism via which economic allocation is decided upon and ultimately implemented in an economy without a state or markets; although the kind of participatory planning found in parecon could also possibly be combined with an artificial market (arket) for certain commercial goods and services.

=== Participatory planning ===
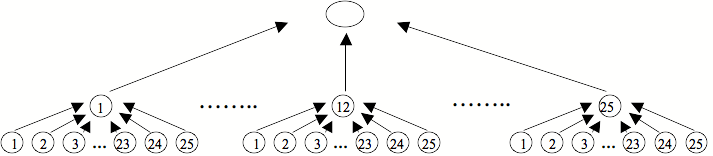
A diagram of the nested council structure.

Democratic participatory planning is an economic practice used to determine the production, consumption, and allocation of resources, goods, and services in a given economy and recommended as a solution to the problems seen in both statist central planning within state-socialism and privatist markets within capitalism. Facilitation boards are used to guide this process effectively.

Through participatory planning, workers and consumers decide democratically which and how many goods to produce, decide construction plans, determine how vital resources are managed and all other economic issues at various levels through a system of confederated "nested councils" or assemblies with local economic issues being determined at the local level, and administrative issues on a wider level being determined by city, regional, provincial, and country councils with delegates sent successively to each level to communicate the decisions made by the nested council below them.

Local decisions like the construction of a playground might be made in the ward or city council, probably interacting with both city and countrywide councils through rotating delegates. Countrywide decisions, like the construction of a high-speed mass transportation system, would be discussed by the country council, possibly interacting with a city council in the city where the materials are produced, or countrywide or international councils.

=== Role in economic planning ===
During an event known as a planning procedure, which could be an annual, bi-annual or quarterly event, facilitation boards first announce a set of indicative prices which workers and consumers use, individually and through their councils at each level, when deciding on their production and consumption proposals. Proposals could be done either collectively through a local consumer council, or individually on a computer; or any combination of the two. When the proposals are all in, the IFBs aggregate all the production and consumption proposals for the different categories of goods and services – inputs into all the production processes as well as consumer goods – to see if proposed supply and demand are equal. If they are not equal for every good and service the IFB revises the set of indicative prices and the process is repeated through successive rounds until a consistent set of production and consumption proposals is arrived at.

The facilitation board would work with the citizen(s) that originated the proposal to work it into a manageable proposition. Around the time of the planning procedure, interested parties within the region affected by the collective consumption proposal would be able to view the collective consumption proposals and vote them up or down. This could be done at large meetings or via computer. At the same time, worker's councils and producers councils would respond with production proposals outlining the outputs they propose to produce and the inputs they believe are required to produce them. Individual workers would indicate their proposed hours of work, and workers will be able to propose upgrades and innovations for their workplace, aided by a facilitation board.

Facilitation boards would then calculate excess proposed supply and demand based on the proposals, adjusting the indicative price for each final good or service according to its impact on society and the environment so that the social opportunity cost is reflected. Using the new indicative prices, consumer and workers' councils would revise and resubmit their proposals, as some goods would be more expensive, and others less expensive. Proposals deemed excessive by other parties would become very expensive, creating a disincentive to pursue them.

Iterations would continue according to some predefined method which is likely to converge within an acceptable time delay. For instance, proposals would only be changeable by a minimum percentage for the second round, and a lesser percentage for the third round, and so on, forcing convergence of a feasible plan.

The facilitation boards then implement these final proposals by setting new prices and organizing production plans. These prices would represent the estimated marginal social opportunity cost for all goods and services. During the planning procedure, not only do the prices reflect proposed supply and demand, but also the social and ecological cost of producing the good. For instance a product that produces pollution in its manufacture, or is especially dangerous for workers to produce, would have its price automatically inflated to discourage excess consumption. Thus

Final retail price = supply and demand + opportunity cost

In the event of unforeseen circumstances occurring in between planning procedures, the IFBs would adjust prices or production quotas accordingly within established guidelines.

The facilitation boards should function according to a maximum level of radical transparency and only have very limited powers of mediation, subject to the discretion of the participating councils. The real decisions regarding the formulation and implementation of the plan are to be made in the consumers' and producers' councils.

== Criticism ==
Facilitation board members would do very important economic work running the economy, and thus one might think they would gradually take over in any system that would adopt them. Its proponents argue that this could be prevented by requiring board members never to handle proposals that pertain to their own region and making any IFB meeting transparent to the public. Political economist Pat Devine has suggested that if implemented in a society with advanced technology, the IFB could itself merely be a highly advanced computer system.

It has been debated whether systems using only participatory planning would be able to change prices as demand changes and other factors modify the results of the participatory planning procedure. Albert and Hahnel have argued that this would be done efficiently. Facilitation boards could continually modify prices as time goes on, finding reasons for production shortfalls, production overruns, changes in demand, environmental disasters, etc. and the facilitation boards could adjust prices accordingly. One proposed way to do this would be to adjust prices within council guidelines on a monthly basis as events unfold.

Hahnel and Albert note that markets themselves hardly adjust prices instantaneously and contend that an economy using universal participatory planning should be able to do just as well, or better. Although not recommended by either Albert or Hahnel, participatory planning could potentially be combined with an artificial market for microeconomic matters so as to take some of the potential strain off consumers and make the planning procedure less complex by retaining it exclusively for macroeconomic matters. Facilitation boards could then be used to regulate the artificial market as well as helping implement macro economic decisions.

== Fictional accounts ==
An institution with the functions of a facilitation board appears as the Resource Review Board in Chris Carlsson's post-revolutionary San Francisco in the novel After the Deluge.

== See also ==
- Enterprise resource planning
- Viable system model
- Project Cybersyn

== External links and sources ==
- Participatory economics website
- Vancouver Participatory Economics Collective
- Old Market Autonomous Zone (Winnipeg)
- Participatory Economy and Inclusive Democracy - A critique
- Nonsense on Stilts: Michael Albert's Parecon - A critique
- Audio material regarding Participatory Economics
- CAPES – Chicago Area Participatory Economics Society

Video

- Cartoon introduction to participatory economics (YouTube video) 7:16 mns, by Jason Mitchell
- Michael Albert in Alternative Economy Cultures Helsinki, Finland, 3 April 2009
