= Socialist economics =

Economic theories, practices and norms of socialism

Socialist economics comprises the economic theories, practices and norms of hypothetical and existing socialist economic systems. A socialist economic system is characterized by social ownership and operation of the means of production that may take the form of autonomous cooperatives or direct public ownership wherein production is carried out directly for use rather than for profit. Socialist systems that utilize markets for allocating capital goods and factors of production among economic units are designated market socialism. When planning is utilized, the economic system is designated as a socialist planned economy. Non-market forms of socialism usually include a system of accounting based on calculation-in-kind to value resources and goods.

Socialist economics has been associated with different schools of economic thought. Marxian economics provided a foundation for socialism based on analysis of capitalism while neoclassical economics and evolutionary economics provided comprehensive models of socialism. During the 20th century, proposals and models for both socialist planned and market economies were based heavily on neoclassical economics or a synthesis of neoclassical economics with Marxian or institutional economics.

As a term, socialist economics may also be applied to the analysis of former and existing economic systems that were implemented in socialist states such as in the works of Hungarian economist János Kornai. 19th-century American individualist anarchist Benjamin Tucker, who connected the classical economics of Adam Smith and the Ricardian socialists as well as that of Pierre-Joseph Proudhon, Karl Marx and Josiah Warren to socialism, held that there were two schools of socialist thought, namely anarchist socialism and state socialism, maintaining that what they had in common was the labor theory of value. Socialists disagree about the degree to which social control or regulation of the economy is necessary; how far society should intervene and whether government, particularly existing government, is the correct vehicle for change are issues of disagreement. The goal of socialist economics is to neutralize capital, or in the case of market socialism to apply social planning to investment and capital.

== History of socialist economic thought ==
Karl Marx and Friedrich Engels believed that hunter-gatherer societies and some primitive agricultural societies were communal, and called this primitive communism. Engels wrote about this at length in the book The Origin of the Family, Private Property and the State, which was based on the unpublished notes of Marx on the work of Lewis Henry Morgan.

Values of socialism have roots in pre-capitalist institutions such as the religious communes, reciprocal obligations and communal charity of medieval Europe, the development of its economic theory primarily reflects and responds to the monumental changes brought about by the dissolution of feudalism and the emergence of specifically capitalist social relations. As such it is commonly regarded as a movement belonging to the modern era. Many socialists have considered their advocacy as the preservation and extension of the radical humanist ideas expressed in Enlightenment doctrine such as Jean-Jacques Rousseau's Discourse on Inequality, Wilhelm von Humboldt's Limits of State Action, or Immanuel Kant's insistent defense of the French Revolution.

Capitalism appeared in mature form as a result of the problems raised when an industrial factory system requiring long-term investment and entailing corresponding risks was introduced into an internationalized commercial (mercantilist) framework. Historically speaking, the most pressing needs of this new system were an assured supply of the elements of industry (land, elaborate machinery, and labour) and these imperatives led to the commodification of these elements.

According to influential socialist economic historian Karl Polanyi's classic account, the forceful transformation of land, money and especially labour into commodities to be allocated by an autonomous market mechanism was an alien and inhuman rupture of the pre-existing social fabric. Marx had viewed the process in a similar light, referring to it as part of the process of "primitive accumulation" whereby enough initial capital is amassed to begin capitalist production. The dislocation that Polyani and others describe, triggered natural counter-movements in efforts to re-embed the economy in society. These counter-movements, that included, for example, the Luddite rebellions, are the incipient socialist movements. Over time such movements gave birth to or acquired an array of intellectual defenders who attempted to develop their ideas in theory.

As Polanyi noted, these counter-movements were mostly reactive and therefore not full-fledged socialist movements. Some demands went no further than a wish to mitigate the capitalist market's worst effects. Later, a full socialist program developed, arguing for systemic transformation. Its theorists believed that even if markets and private property could be tamed so as not to be excessively "exploitative", or crises could be effectively mitigated, capitalist social relations would remain significantly unjust and anti-democratic, suppressing universal human needs for fulfilling, empowering and creative work, diversity and solidarity.

Within this context, socialism has undergone four periods: the first in the 19th century was a period of utopian visions (1780s–1850s); then occurred the rise of revolutionary socialist and communist movements in the 19th century as the primary opposition to the rise of corporations and industrialization (1830–1916); the polarisation of socialism around the question of the Soviet Union and adoption of socialist or social democratic policies in response (1916–1989); and the response of socialism in the neoliberal era (1970s–present). As socialism developed, so did the socialist system of economics.

=== Socialist political economy before Marx ===
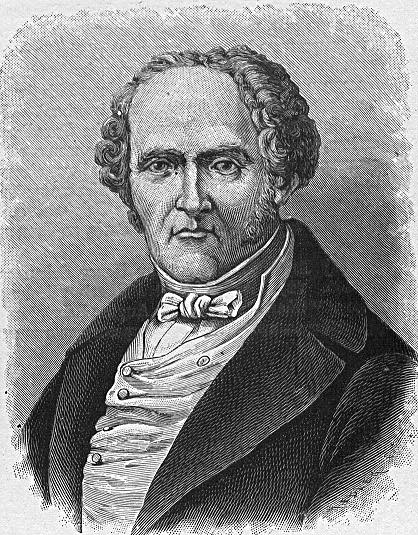
Charles Fourier, influential early French socialist thinker

A key early socialist theorist of political economy was Pierre-Joseph Proudhon. He was the most well-known of nineteenth century mutualist theorists and the first thinker to refer to himself as an anarchist. Others were: Technocrats like Henri de Saint-Simon, agrarian radicals like Thomas Spence, William Ogilvie and William Cobbett; anti-capitalists like Thomas Hodgskin; communitarian and utopian socialists like Robert Owen, William Thompson and Charles Fourier; anti-market socialists like John Gray and John Francis Bray; the Christian mutualist William Batchelder Greene; as well as the theorists of the Chartist movement and early proponents of syndicalism.

The first advocates of socialism promoted social leveling in order to create a meritocratic or technocratic society based upon individual talent. Count Henri de Saint-Simon was the first individual to coin the term "socialism". Saint-Simon was fascinated by the enormous potential of science and technology, which led him to advocate a socialist society that would eliminate the disorderly aspects of capitalism and which would be based upon equal opportunities. Saint-Simon advocated a society in which people were ranked according to their capacities and rewarded according to their work. This was accompanied by a desire to implement a rationally organized economy based on planning and geared towards large-scale scientific and material progress, which embodied a desire for a semi-planned economy.

Other early socialist thinkers were influenced by the classical economists. The Ricardian socialists, such as Thomas Hodgskin and Charles Hall, were based on the work of David Ricardo and reasoned that the equilibrium value of commodities approximated producer prices when those commodities were in elastic supply, and that these producer prices corresponded to the embodied labor. The Ricardian socialists viewed profit, interest and rent as deductions from this exchange-value.

=== Karl Marx and Das Kapital ===
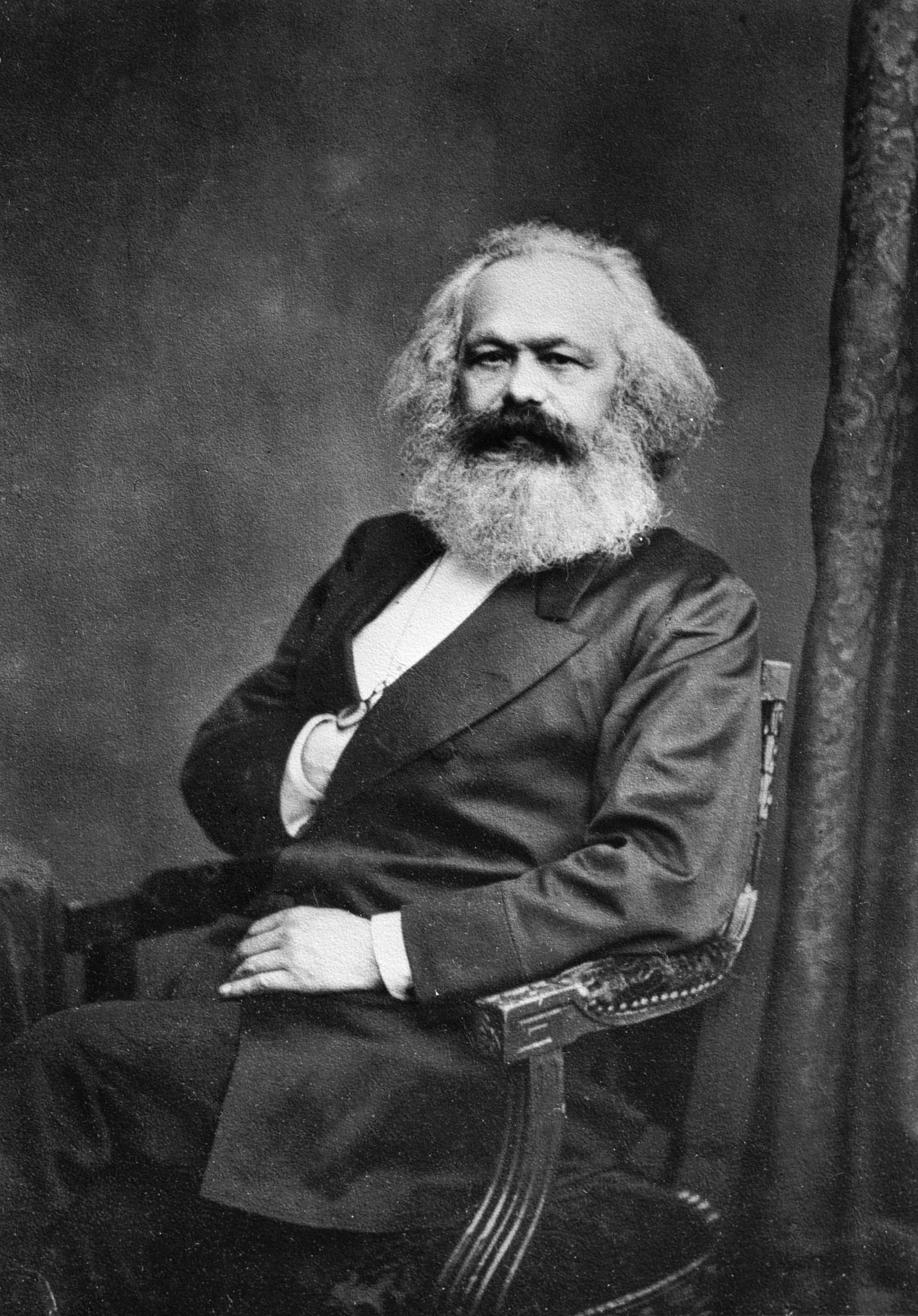
Karl Marx, influential German socialist thinker and economist

Karl Marx's approach, which Friedrich Engels would call "scientific socialism", would stand as the branching point in economic theory. In one direction went those who rejected the capitalist system as fundamentally anti-social, arguing that it could never be harnessed to effectively realize the fullest development of human potentialities wherein "the free development of each is the condition for the free development of all".

Marx's Das Kapital is an incomplete work of economic theory; he had planned four volumes but completed two and left his collaborator Engels to complete the third. In many ways, the work is modelled on Smith's Wealth of Nations, seeking to be a comprehensive logical description of production, consumption, and finance in relation to morality and the state. The work of philosophy, anthropology, sociology, and economics includes the following topics:

- Law of value: capitalist production is the production of "an immense multitude of commodities" or generalised commodity production. A commodity has two essential qualities firstly, they are useful, they satisfy some human want, "the nature of such wants, whether, for instance, they spring from the stomach or from fancy, makes no difference" and secondly they are sold on a market or exchanged. Critically the exchange value of a commodity "is independent of the amount of labour required to appropriate its useful qualities". However, rather depends on the amount of socially necessary labour required to produce it. All commodities are sold at their value, so the origin of the capitalist profit is not in cheating or theft, but in the fact that the cost of reproduction of labour power, or the worker's wage, is less than the value created during their time at work, enabling the capitalists to yield a surplus value or profit on their investments.
- Historical property relations: historical capitalism represents a process of momentous social upheaval where rural masses were separated from the land and ownership of the means of production by force, deprivation, and legal manipulation, creating an urban proletariat based on the institution of wage-labour. Moreover, capitalist property relations aggravated the artificial separation between city and country, which is a key factor in accounting for the metabolic rift between human beings in capitalism and their natural environment, which is at the root of our current ecological dilemmas.
- Commodity fetishism: Marx adapted previous value-theory to show that in capitalism phenomena involved with the price system (markets, competition, supply and demand) constitute a powerful ideology that obscures the underlying social relations of capitalist society. "Commodity fetishism" refers to this distortion of appearance. The underlying social reality is one of economic exploitation.
- Economic exploitation: workers are the fundamental creative source of new value. Property relations affording the right of usufruct and despotic control of the workplace to capitalists are the devices by which the surplus value created by workers is appropriated by the capitalists.
- Capital accumulation: inherent to capitalism is the incessant drive to accumulate as a response to the competitive forces acting upon all capitalists. In such a context the accumulated wealth which is the source of the capitalist's social power derives itself from being able to repeat the circuit of money→commodity→money, where the capitalist receives an increment or "surplus value" higher than their initial investment, as rapidly and efficiently as possible. Moreover, this driving imperative leads capitalism to its expansion on a worldwide scale.
- Crises: Marx identified natural and historically specific (i.e. structural) barriers to accumulation that were interrelated and interpenetrated one another in times of crises. Different types of crises, such as realization crises and overproduction crises, are expressions of capitalism's inability to constructively overcome such barriers. Moreover, the upshot of crises is increased centralization, the expropriation of the many capitalists by the few.
- Centralization: the interacting forces of competition, endemic crises, intensive and extensive expansion of the scale of production, and a growing interdependency with the state apparatus, all promote a strong developmental tendency towards the centralization of capital.
- Material development: as a result of its constant drive to optimize profitability by increasing the productivity of labour, typically by revolutionizing technology and production techniques, capitalism develops so as to progressively reduce the objective need for work, suggesting the potential for a new era of creative forms of work and expanded scope for leisure.
- Socialization and the pre-conditions for social revolution: by socializing the labour process, concentrating workers into urban settings in large-scale production processes and linking them in a worldwide market, the agents of a potential revolutionary change are created. Thus Marx felt that in the course of its development capitalism was at the same time developing the preconditions for its own negation. However, although the objective conditions for change are generated by the capitalist system itself, the subjective conditions for social revolution can only come about through the apprehension of the objective circumstances by the agents themselves and the transformation of such understanding into an effective revolutionary program.

=== Anarchist economics ===
Anarchist economics is the set of theories and practices of economics and economic activity within the political philosophy of anarchism.

Pierre-Joseph Proudhon was involved with the Lyons mutualists and later adopted the name to describe his own teachings. Mutualism is an anarchist school of thought that originates in the writings of Pierre-Joseph Proudhon, who envisioned a society where each person might possess a means of production, either individually or collectively, with trade representing equivalent amounts of labor in the free market. Integral to the scheme was the establishment of a mutual-credit bank that would lend to producers at a minimal interest rate, just high enough to cover administration. Mutualism is based on a labor theory of value that holds that when labor or its product is sold, in exchange, it ought to receive goods or services embodying "the amount of labor necessary to produce an article of exactly similar and equal utility".

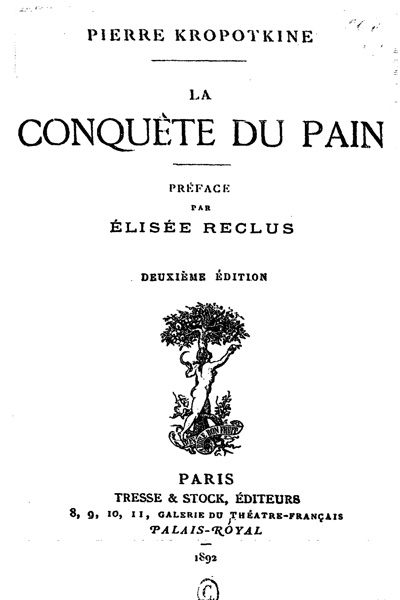
The Conquest of Bread by Peter Kropotkin, influential work which presents the economic vision of anarcho-communism

Collectivist anarchism is a revolutionary doctrine that advocates the abolition of the state and private ownership of the means of production. Instead, it envisions the means of production being owned collectively and controlled and managed by the producers themselves. Once collectivization takes place, workers' salaries would be determined in democratic organizations based on the amount of time they contributed to production. These salaries would be used to purchase goods in a communal market.

Anarcho-communism is a theory of anarchism which advocates the abolition of the state, private property, and capitalism in favor of common ownership of the means of production, direct democracy and a horizontal network of voluntary associations, and workers' councils with production and consumption based on the guiding principle: "from each according to ability, to each according to need". Unlike mutualism, collectivist anarchism and Marxism, anarcho-communism as defended by Peter Kropotkin and Errico Malatesta rejected the labor theory of value altogether, instead advocating a gift economy and to base distribution on need. As a coherent, modern economic-political philosophy, anarcho-communism was first formulated in the Italian section of the First International by Carlo Cafiero, Emilio Covelli, Errico Malatesta, Andrea Costa, and other ex-Mazzinian Republicans. Out of respect for Mikhail Bakunin, they did not make their differences with collectivist anarchism explicit until after Bakunin's death.

Market anarchism strongly affirms the classical liberal ideas of self-ownership and free markets, while maintaining that, taken to their logical conclusions, these ideas support strongly anti-corporatist, anti-hierarchical, pro-labor positions and anti-capitalism in economics and anti-imperialism in foreign policy.

=== Immanuel Wallerstein ===
In 1979, Immanuel Wallerstein wrote:

There are today no socialist systems in the world-economy any more than there are feudal systems because there is only one world-system. It is a world-economy and it is by definition capitalist in form. Socialism involves the creation of a new kind of world-system, neither a redistributive world-empire nor a capitalist world-economy but a socialist world-government. I don't see this projection as being in the least utopian but I also don't feel its institution is imminent. It will be the outcome of a long social struggle in forms that may be familiar and perhaps in very few forms, that will take place in all the areas of the world-economy.

== Characteristics ==
A socialist economy is a system of production where goods and services are produced directly for use, in contrast to a capitalist economic system, where goods and services are produced to generate profit (and therefore indirectly for use). "Production under socialism would be directly and solely for use. With the natural and technical resources of the world held in common and controlled democratically, the sole object of production would be to meet human needs." Goods and services would be produced for their usefulness, or for their use-value, eliminating the need for market-induced needs to ensure a sufficient amount of demand for products to be sold at a profit. Production in a socialist economy is therefore "planned" or "coordinated", and does not suffer from the business cycle inherent to capitalism. In most socialist theories, economic planning only applies to the factors of production and not to the allocation of goods and services produced for consumption, which would be distributed through a market. Karl Marx stated that "lower-stage communism" would consist of compensation based on the amount of labor one contributes to the social product.

The ownership of the means of production varies in different socialist theories. It can either be based on public ownership by a state apparatus; direct ownership by the users of the productive property through worker cooperative; or commonly owned by all of society with management and control delegated to those who operate/use the means of production.

Management and control over the activities of enterprises is based on self-management and self-governance, with equal power-relations in the workplace to maximize occupational autonomy. A socialist form of organization would eliminate controlling hierarchies so that only a hierarchy based on technical knowledge in the workplace remains. Every member would have decision-making power in the firm and would be able to participate in establishing its overall policy objectives. The policies/goals would be carried out by the technical specialists that form the coordinating hierarchy of the firm, who would establish plans or directives for the work community to accomplish these goals.

However, the economies of the former Socialist states, excluding Yugoslavia, were based on bureaucratic, top-down administration of economic directives and micromanagement of the worker in the workplace inspired by capitalist models of scientific management. As a result, some socialist movements have argued that said economies were not socialist due to the lack of equal power-relations in the workplace, the presence of a new "elite", and because of the commodity production that took place in these economies. These economic and social systems have been classified as being either "bureaucratic collectivist", "state capitalist" or "deformed workers' states" by its critics. The exact nature of the USSR et al. remains unresolved within said socialist movements. However, other socialist movements defend the systems that were in place in Eastern Europe and the Soviet Union, remembering, as said above, that public ownership of the means of production can signify many variants. In the case of the Soviet Union and its satellites, it was the State which controlled and managed almost all of the economy as a single huge enterprise. Furthermore, the products that were manufactured in Soviet-type economies were not produced directly for use, given the fact that all of them were sold to the public at below-market prices (i.e. they were sold in deficit to satisfy the needs of the population).

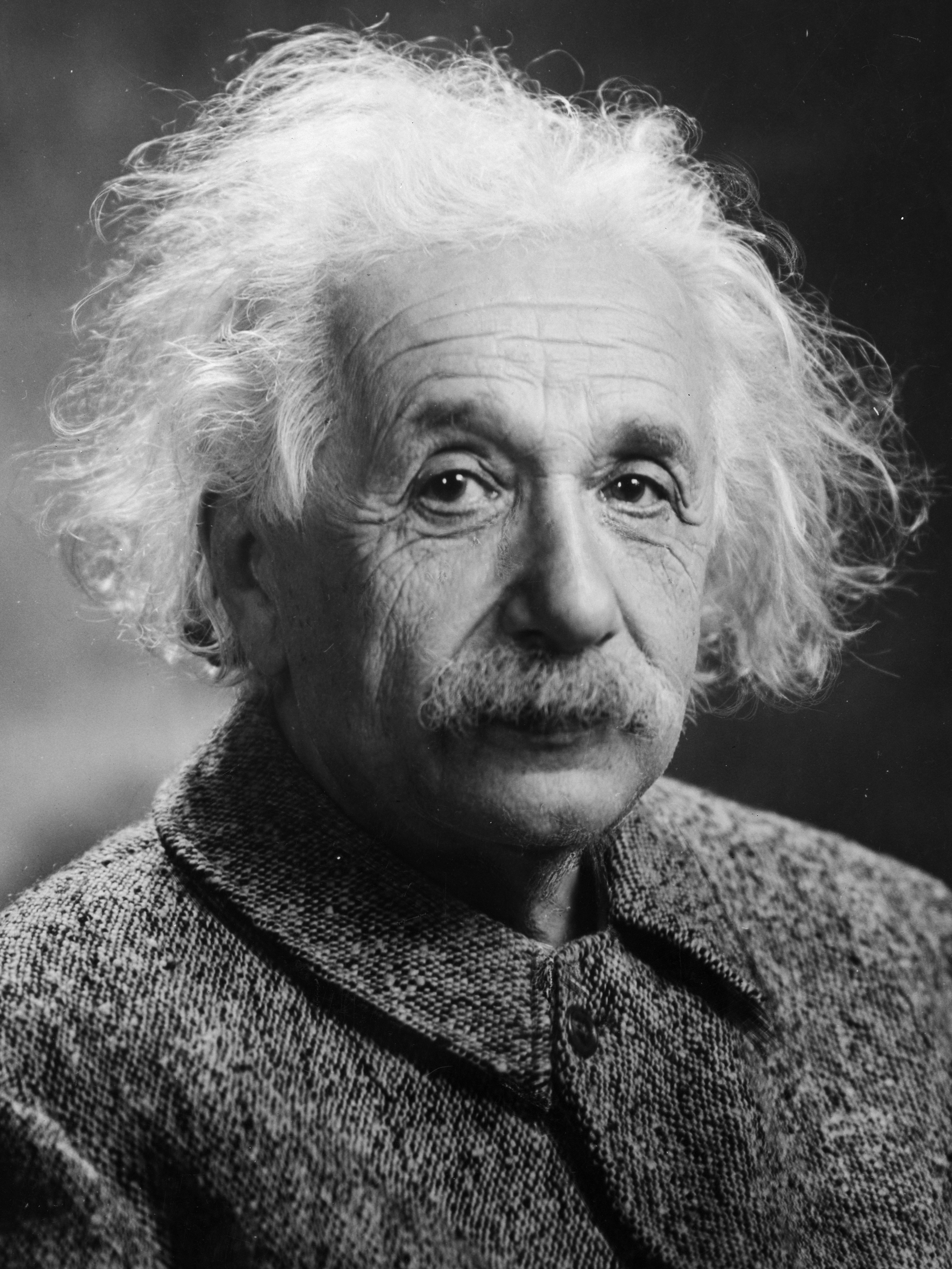
Albert Einstein advocated for a socialist planned economy with his 1949 article "Why Socialism?"

In the May 1949 issue of the Monthly Review titled "Why Socialism?", Albert Einstein wrote:

I am convinced there is only one way to eliminate (the) grave evils (of capitalism), namely through the establishment of a socialist economy, accompanied by an educational system which would be oriented toward social goals. In such an economy, the means of production are owned by society itself and are utilized in a planned fashion. A planned economy, which adjusts production to the needs of the community, would distribute the work to be done among all those able to work and would guarantee a livelihood to every man, woman, and child. The education of the individual, in addition to promoting his own innate abilities, would attempt to develop in him a sense of responsibility for his fellow-men in place of the glorification of power and success in our present society.

=== Economic planning ===
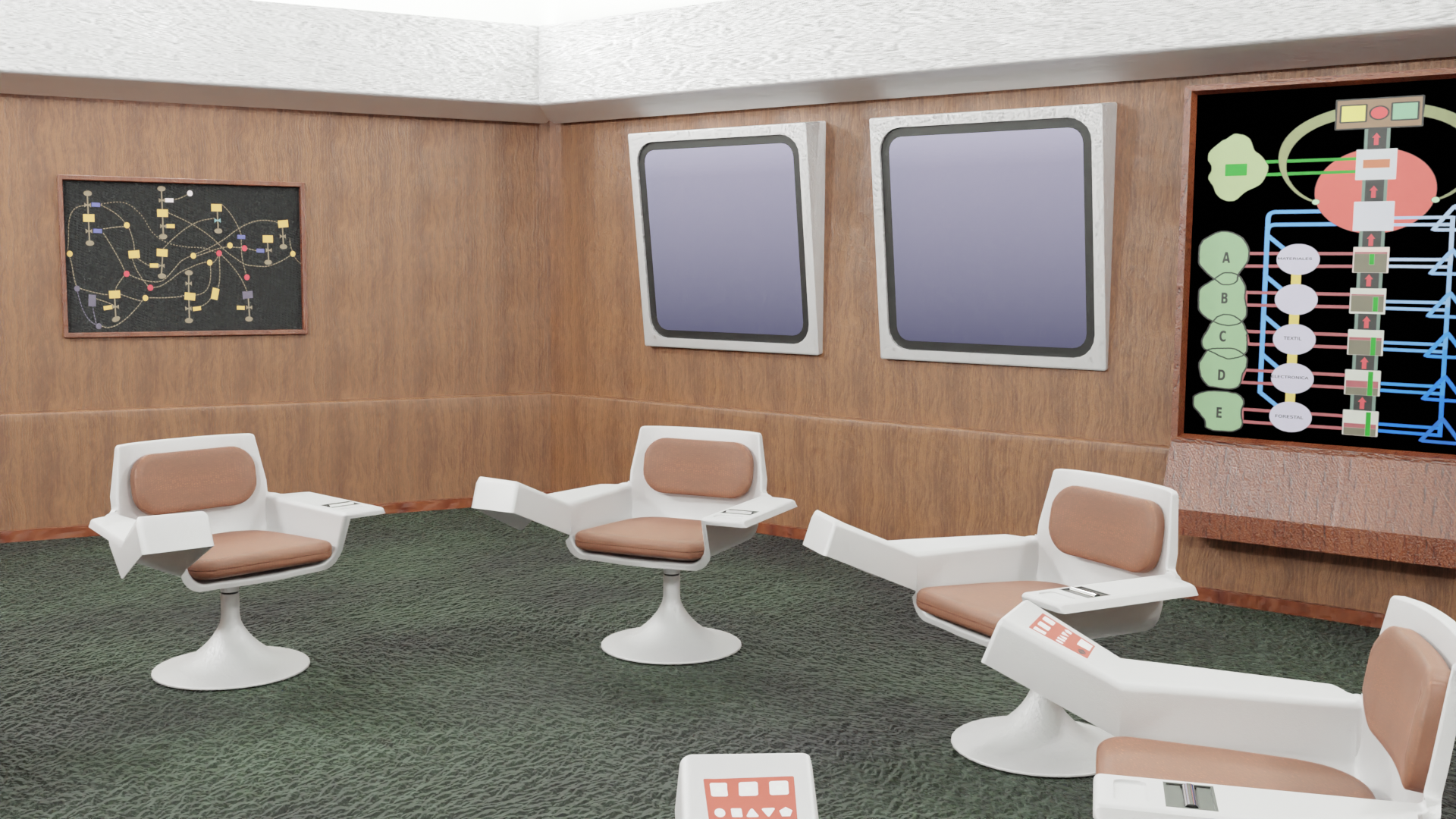
Project Cybersyn was an early form of computational economic planning.

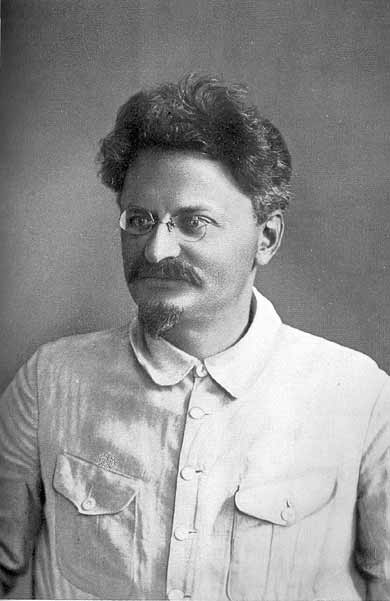
Leon Trotsky was among the earliest Soviet figures that supported economic planning and decentralization but opposed the Stalinist model.

Economic planning is a mechanism for the allocation of economic inputs and decision-making based on direct allocation, in contrast to the market mechanism, which is based on indirect allocation.

Economic planning is not synonymous with the concept of a command economy, which existed in the Soviet Union, and was based on a highly bureaucratic administration of the entire economy in accordance to a comprehensive plan formulated by a central planning agency, which specified output requirements for productive units and tried to micromanage the decisions and policies of enterprises. The command economy is based on the organizational model of a capitalist firm, but applies it to the entire economy.

Various advocates of economic planning have been staunch critics of command economies and centralized planning. For example, Leon Trotsky believed that central planners, regardless of their intellectual capacity, operated without the input and participation of the millions of people who participate in the economy and understand the local conditions and rapid changes in the economy. Therefore, central planners would be unable to effectively coordinate all economic activity because they lacked this informal information.

=== Economic value theories ===
Socialist economic theories base the value of a good or service on its use value, rather than its cost of production (labor theory of value) or its exchange value (marginal utility). Other socialist theories, such as mutualism and market socialism, attempt to apply the labor theory of value to socialism, so that the price of a good or service is adjusted to equal the amount of labor time expended in its production. The labor-time expended by each worker would correspond to labor credits, which would be used as a currency to acquire goods and services. Market socialists that base their models on neoclassical economics, and thus marginal utility, such as Oskar Lange and Abba Lerner, have proposed that publicly owned enterprises set their price to equal marginal cost, thereby achieving pareto efficiency. Anarcho-communism as defended by Peter Kropotkin and Errico Malatesta rejected the labor theory of value and exchange value itself, advocated a gift economy and to base distribution on need.

== Economic models and systems ==
Robin Hahnel and Michael Albert identify five different economic models within socialist economics:

- Public enterprise centrally planned economy in which all property is owned by the state and all key economic decisions are made centrally by the state, e.g. the former Soviet Union.
- Public enterprise state-managed market economy, one form of market socialism which attempts to use the price mechanism to increase economic efficiency while all decisive productive assets remain in the ownership of the state, e.g. the socialist market economy in China and the socialist-oriented market economy in Vietnam after reforms.
- A mixed economy, where public and private ownership are mixed and industrial planning is ultimately subordinate to market allocation, e.g. the model generally adopted by social democrats in the 20th century such as in Sweden. Many different proposals for socialist economic systems call for a type of mixed economy, where multiple forms of ownership over the means of production co-exist with one another. Alternatively, a mixed economy may also be a socialist economy that allows a substantial role for private enterprise and contracting within a dominant economic framework of public ownership. This can extend to Soviet-type planned economies that have been reformed to incorporate a greater role for markets in the allocation of factors of production.
- Public enterprise employee managed market economies, another form of market socialism in which publicly owned, employee-managed production units engage in free-market exchanges of goods and services with one another as well as with final consumers, e.g. mid-20th-century Yugoslavia. Two more theoretical models are Prabhat Ranjan Sarkar's progressive utilization theory and economic democracy.
- Public enterprise participatory planning, an economy featuring social ownership of the means of production with allocation based on an integration of decentralized democratic planning, e.g. stateless communism and libertarian socialism. An incipient historical forebear is that of Catalonia during the Spanish Revolution. More developed theoretical models include those of Karl Polanyi, participatory economics, Inclusive Democracy and the negotiated coordination model of Pat Devine as well as in Cornelius Castoriadis's pamphlet "Workers' Councils and the Economics of a Self-Managed Society".

János Kornai identifies five distinct types of socialism:

- Classical and Marxist conception, where socialism is a stage of economic development in which wage labour, private property in the means of production and monetary relations have been made redundant through the development of the productive forces, so that capital accumulation has been superseded by economic planning. Economic planning in this definition means conscious allocation of economic inputs and the means of production by the associated producers to directly maximise use-values as opposed to exchange-values, in contrast to the "anarchy of production" of capitalism.
- Walrasian and market socialist which defines socialism as public-ownership or cooperative-enterprises in a market economy, with prices for producer goods set through a trial-and-error method by a central planning board. In this view, socialism is defined in terms of de jure public property rights over major enterprises.
- Marxist–Leninist conception which includes a form of political organisation based on control of the means of production and government by a single political party apparatus that claims to act in the interest of the working class and an ideology hostile toward markets and political dissent, with coordination of economic activity through centralised economic planning, e.g. a command economy in the form of an administrative-command system.
- Social-democratic concept based on the capitalist mode of production which defines socialism as a set of values rather than a specific type of social and economic organisation. It includes unconditional support for parliamentary democracy, gradual and reformist attempts to establish socialism and support for socially progressive causes. Social democrats are not opposed to the market or private property and instead they try to ameliorate the effects of capitalism through a welfare state which relies on the market as the fundamental coordinating entity in the economy and a degree of public ownership/public provision of public goods in an economy otherwise dominated by private enterprise.
- East Asian model, or socialist market economy, based on a largely free-market, capital accumulation for profit and substantial private ownership along with state-ownership of strategic industries monopolised by a single political party. János Kornai ultimately leaves the classification of this model (as either socialist or capitalist) to the reader.

Socialism can be divided into market socialism and planned socialism based on their dominant mechanism of resource allocation. Another distinction can be made between the type of property structures of different socialist systems (public, cooperative or common) and on the dominant form of economic management within the economy (hierarchical or self-managed).

=== Economic democracy ===
Economic democracy is a model of market socialism primarily developed by the American economist David Schweickart. In Schweickart's model, enterprises and natural resources are owned by society in the form of public banking, and management is elected by the workers within each firm. Profits would be distributed among the workers of the respective enterprise.

=== Self-managed economy ===
The self-managed economy is a form of socialism where enterprises are owned and managed by their employees, effectively negating the employer-employee (or wage labor) dynamic of capitalism and emphasizing the opposition to alienation, self-managing and cooperative aspect of socialism. Members of cooperative firms are relatively free to manage their own affairs and work schedules. This model was developed most extensively by the Yugoslav economists Branko Horvat, Jaroslav Vanek and the American economist Benjamin Ward.

=== Worker self-directed enterprise ===
Worker self-directed enterprise is a recent proposal advocated by the American Marxian economist Richard D. Wolff. This model shares many similarities with the model of socialist self-management in that employees own and direct their enterprises, but places a greater role on democratically elected management within a market economy.

=== Democratic planned socialism ===
Democratic planned socialism is a form of decentralized planned economy.

=== Feasible socialism ===
Feasible socialism was the name Alec Nove gave his outline for socialism in his work The Economics of Feasible Socialism. According to Nove, this model of socialism is "feasible" because it can be realized within the lifetime of anyone living today. It involves a combination of publicly owned and centrally directed enterprises for large-scale industries, autonomous publicly owned enterprises, consumer and worker-owned cooperatives for the majority of the economy, and private ownership for small businesses. It is a market-based mixed economy that includes a substantial role for macroeconomic interventionism and indicative economic planning.

=== Pragmatic market socialism ===
The American economist James Yunker detailed a model where social ownership of the means of production is achieved the same way private ownership is achieved in modern capitalism through the shareholder system that separates management functions from ownership. Yunker posits that social ownership can be achieved by having a public body, designated the Bureau of Public Ownership (BPO), owning the shares of publicly listed firms without affecting market-based allocation of capital inputs. Yunker termed this model pragmatic market socialism because it does not require massive changes to society and would leave the existing management system intact, and would be at least as efficient as modern-day capitalism while providing superior social outcomes as public ownership of large and established enterprises would enable profits to be distributed among the entire population in a social dividend rather than going largely to a class of inheriting rentiers.

=== Participatory economy ===
Participatory economics utilizes participatory decision making as an economic mechanism to guide the production, consumption and allocation of resources in a given society.

=== Computer-managed allocation ===
Proposals for utilizing computer-based coordination and information technology for the coordination and optimization of resource allocation (also known as cybernetics) within an economy have been outlined by various socialists, economists and computer scientists, including Oskar Lange, the Soviet engineer Viktor Glushkov, and more recently Paul Cockshott and Allin Cottrell.

=== Peer-to-peer economy and open source ===
The "networked information age" has enabled the development and emergence of new forms of organizing the production of value in non-market arrangements that have been termed commons-based peer production along with the negation of ownership and the concept of property in the development of software in the form of open source and open design.

=== Negotiated coordination ===
Economist Pat Devine has created a model of coordination called "negotiated coordination", which is based upon social ownership by those affected by the use of the assets involved, with decisions made by those at the most localised level of production.

== Elements of socialism in practice ==
=== Centrally planned economies ===
A centrally planned economy combines public ownership of the means of production with centralized state planning. This model is usually associated with the Soviet-type command economy. In a centrally planned economy, decisions regarding the quantity of goods and services to be produced are planned in advance by a planning agency. In the early years of Soviet central planning, the planning process was based upon a selected number of physical flows with inputs mobilized to meet explicit production targets measured in natural or technical units. This material balances method of achieving plan coherence was later complemented and replaced by value planning, with money provided to enterprises so that they could recruit labour and procure materials and intermediate production goods and services. The Soviet economy was brought to balance by the interlocking of three sets of calculation, namely the setting up of a model incorporating balances of production, manpower and finance. The exercise was undertaken annually and involved a process of iteration (the "method of successive approximation"). Although nominally a "centrally planned" economy, in reality formulation of the plan took place on a more local level of the production process as information was relayed from enterprises to planning ministries. Aside from the Soviet Union and Eastern Bloc economies, this economic model was also utilized by the People's Republic of China, Socialist Republic of Vietnam, Republic of Cuba and North Korea.

==== Soviet Union ====
The Soviet Union and some of its European satellites aimed for a fully centrally-planned economy. While they dispensed almost entirely with private ownership over the means of production, workers still effectively received a wage for their labour. Some believe that according to Marxist theory this should have been a step towards a genuine workers' state. However, some Marxists consider this a misunderstanding of Marx's views on historical materialism and of his views on the process of socialization.

Characteristics of the Soviet economic model included:

- production quotas for every productive unit. A farm, mine or factory was judged on the basis of whether its production met the quota. It would be provided with a quota of the inputs it needed to start production, and then its quota of output would be taken away and given to downstream production units or distributed to consumers.
- allocation through political control. In contrast with systems where prices determined allocation of resources, the Soviet bureaucracy determined allocation, particularly of the means of production. The prices that were constructed were determined after the formulation of the economy plan, and such prices did not factor into choices about what was produced and how it was produced in the first place.
- full employment. Every worker was ensured employment. However workers were generally not directed to jobs. The central-planning administration adjusted relative wages rates to influence job choice in accordance with the outlines of the current plan.
- clearing goods by planning: if a surplus of a product accumulated, then the central planning authority would either reduce the quota for its production or increase the quota for its use.
- five-year plans for the long-term development of key industries.

The planning system in the Soviet Union developed under Stalin between 1928 and 1934. According to historian Sheila Fitzpatrick, the scholarly consensus was that Stalin appropriated the position of the Left Opposition on such matters as industrialisation and collectivisation. After the end of the Second World War in 1945, the seven countries with communist governments in Central and Eastern Europe introduced central planning with five- (or six-) year plans on the Soviet model by 1951. The common features included the nationalization of industry, transport and trade, compulsory procurement in farming (but not collectivization) and government monopolies on foreign trade. Prices were largely determined on the basis of the costs of inputs, a method derived from the labour theory of value. Prices did not therefore incentivize production enterprises, whose inputs were instead purposely rationed by the central plan. This "taut planning" began around 1930 in the Soviet Union and only became attenuated after the economic reforms in 1966–1968, when enterprises were encouraged to make profits.

According to communist doctrine, planning had the stated purpose of enabling the people - through the communist party and state institutions - to undertake activities that would have been frustrated by a market economy, including the rapid expansion of universal education and health care, urban development with mass good-quality housing, and industrial development of all regions of the country. Nevertheless, markets continued to exist in Soviet-type planned economies. Even after the collectivization of agriculture in the Soviet Union in the 1930s, members of collective farms and anyone with a private garden plot were free to sell their own produce (farm workers were often paid in kind). Licensed markets operated in every town and city borough where non-state-owned enterprises (such as cooperatives and collective farms) were able to offer their products and services. From 1956 and 1959 onwards, all wartime controls over manpower were removed and people could apply for and quit jobs freely in the Soviet Union. The use of market mechanisms went furthest in Yugoslavia, Czechoslovakia and Hungary. From 1975, Soviet citizens had the right to engage in private handicraft; collective farmers could raise and sell livestock privately from 1981. Households were free to dispose of their income as they chose, and incomes were lightly taxed.

Historian Robert Vincent Daniels regarded the Stalinist period to represent an abrupt break with Lenin's government in terms of economic planning in which an deliberated, scientific system of planning that featured former Menshevik economists at Gosplan had been replaced with a hasty version of planning with unrealistic targets, bureaucratic waste, bottlenecks and shortages. Stalin's formulations of national plans in terms of physical quantity of output was also attributed by Daniels as a source for the stagnant levels of efficiency and quality.

===== Dispute that the Soviet model is socialism =====
Various scholars and political economists have criticized the claim that the centrally-planned economy - and specifically the Soviet model of economic development - constitutes a form of socialism. They argue that the Soviet economy was structured upon the accumulation of capital and the extraction of surplus value from the working class by the planning agency in order to reinvest this surplus into the economy and to distribute to managers and senior officials, indicating the Soviet Union and other Soviet-style economies were state-capitalist and unplanned administrative-command economies. More fundamentally, these economies were structured around the dynamic of capitalism, i.e. the accumulation of capital, production for profit (as opposed to being based on production for use—the defining criterion for socialism) and the law of value, having not yet transcended the system of capitalism, but being in fact a variation of capitalism based on a process of state-directed accumulation.

On the other side of the argument, economists contend that no surplus value was generated from labour activity or from commodity markets in the socialist planned economies; they therefore claim that there was no exploiting class, even if inequalities existed. Since prices were controlled and set below market-clearing levels, there was no element of value added at the point of sale - as occurs in capitalist market economies. Prices were built up from the average cost of inputs, including wages, taxes, interest on stocks and working capital as well as allowances to cover the recoupment of investment and for depreciation, so there was no profit margin in the price charged to customers. Wages did not reflect the purchase price of labour, since labour was not a commodity traded in a market and the employing organizations did not own the means of production. Wages were set at a level that permitted a decent standard of living; they rewarded specialist skills and educational qualifications. In macroeconomic terms, the plan allocated the whole national product to workers in the form of wages for the workers' own use, with a fraction withheld for investment and for imports from abroad. The difference between the average value of wages and the value of national output per worker did not imply the existence of surplus value since it was part of a consciously formulated plan for the development of society. The presence of inequality in the socialist planned economies did not imply that an exploiting class existed. In the Soviet Union, communist-party members were able to buy scarce goods in special shops and the leadership elite took advantage of state property to live in more spacious accommodation - and sometimes in luxury. Although they received privileges not commonly available and some additional income in kind, there was no difference in their official remuneration in comparison to their non-party peers. Enterprise managers and workers received only the wages and bonuses related to the production targets that the planning authorities had set. Outside of the cooperative sector - which enjoyed greater economic freedoms and whose profits were shared among all members of the cooperative - there was no profit-taking class. Other analysts maintain that workers in the Soviet Union and in other Marxist–Leninist states had genuine control over the means of production through institutions such as trade unions.

Some socialist critics point to the lack of socialist social relations in Soviet-style economies (specifically the lack of self-management), to a bureaucratic elite based on hierarchical and centralized powers of authority as well as to the lack of genuine worker control over the means of production. Such factors lead them to conclude that Soviet economies were not socialist, but examples either of bureaucratic collectivism or of state capitalism. Trotskyists regard mature Soviet systems as neither socialist nor capitalist—but as deformed workers' states. This analysis is consistent with the April Theses of 1917, in which Lenin stated that the prospective Bolshevik revolution aimed not to introduce socialism (which could only be established on a worldwide scale), but to bring production and the state under the control of the Soviets of Workers' Deputies. Trotsky himself would weigh the material benefits and challenges associated with the adoption of the New Economic Policy for the early Soviet Union in his work, Towards Socialism or Capitalism?. Furthermore, communist states often do not claim to have achieved socialism in their countries; on the contrary, they claim to be building and working toward the establishment of socialism in their countries. For example, the preamble to the Socialist Republic of Vietnam's constitution states that Vietnam only entered a transition stage between capitalism and socialism after the country was re-unified under the Communist party in 1976, and the 1992 Constitution of the Republic of Cuba states that the role of the Communist Party is to "guide the common effort toward the goals and construction of socialism".

Stalinists and their followers challenge this view - they claim that socialism was established in the Soviet Union after Joseph Stalin came to power in the late 1920s and instituted the system of five-year plans in 1928. The 1936 Constitution of the Soviet Union, known as the Fundamental Law of Victorious Socialism, embodied the claim that the foundations for socialism had been laid. In 1924 Stalin introduced the theory of socialism in one country, which argued that socialism can be built in a single country, despite existing within a global capitalist economic system. Nevertheless, the Soviet orthodoxy held that the stage during which developed socialism would be built would be a lengthy one and would not be achieved by the Soviet Union on its own. According to the official textbooks, the first stage of the transition period from capitalism to socialism had been completed by the 1970s in the European socialist countries (except Poland and Yugoslavia) and in Mongolia and Cuba. The next stage of developed socialism would not be reached until "the economic integration of the socialist states becomes a major factor of their economic progress" and social relations had been reconstructed on "collectivist principles". Communist writers accepted that during the earlier stages in constructing socialism the exchange of commodities on the basis of the average socially necessary labour embodied within them occurred and involved the mediation of money. Socialist planned economies were systems of commodity production, but this was directed in a conscious way towards meeting the needs of the people and not left to the "anarchy of the market". At the stage of developed socialism, "the state of dictatorship of the proletariat changes into a state of all people reflecting the increasing homogeneity of society" and the "evening out of economic development levels" within and between socialist countries. It would provide the foundations for a further stage of perfected socialist society, where an abundance of goods permitted their distribution according to need. Only then could the world socialist system progress towards the higher phase of communism.

==== World socialist economic system ====
By the 1980s, the world economic socialist system embraced one-third of the world's population but generated no more than 15 percent of global economic output. At its height in the mid-1980s, the world socialist system could be said to comprise the following countries with a "socialist orientation", though not all were allies of the Soviet Union: Afghanistan, Albania, Angola, Bulgaria, Cambodia, China, Cuba, Czechoslovakia, East Germany, Ethiopia, Hungary, Mozambique, Nicaragua, North Korea, Laos, Mongolia, Poland, Romania, Vietnam, South Yemen, Yugoslavia and the Soviet Union. The system co-existed alongside the world capitalist system but was founded upon the principles of cooperation and mutual assistance rather than upon competition and rivalry. The countries involved aimed to even-out the level of economic development and to play an equal part in the international division of labour. An important role was played by the Council for Mutual Economic Assistance (CMEA) or Comecon, an international body set up to promote economic development. It involved joint planning activity, the establishment of international economic, scientific and technical bodies and methods of cooperation between state agencies and enterprises, including joint ventures and projects. Allied to the CMEA were the International Development Bank, established in 1971; and the International Bank for Economic Cooperation, founded in 1963, which had their counterparts in the World Bank, the Bank for International Settlements and the International Monetary Fund in the non-socialist world.

The main tasks of the CMEA were plan coordination, production specialization and regional trade. In 1961 Nikita Khrushchev, the Soviet leader, put forward proposals for establishing an integrated, centrally-planned socialist commonwealth in which each geographic region would specialize production in line with its set of natural and human resources. The resulting document, the "Basic Principles of the International Socialist Division of Labour" was adopted at the end of 1961, despite objections from Romania on certain aspects. The "Basic Principles" were never implemented fully and were replaced in 1971 by the adoption of the "Comprehensive Programme for Further Extension and Improvement of Cooperation and Development of Socialist Economic Integration". As a result, many specialization agreements were made between CMEA member states for investment programmes and projects. The importing country pledged to rely on the exporting country for its consumption of the product in question. Production specialization occurred in engineering, automotive, chemicals, computers and automation, telecommunications and biotechnology. Scientific and technical cooperation between CMEA member states was facilitated by the establishment in 1969 of the International Centre for Scientific and Technical Information in Moscow.

Trade between CMEA member states was divided into "hard goods" and "soft goods". The former could be sold on world markets and the latter could not. Commodities such as food, energy products and raw materials tended to be hard goods and were traded within the CMEA area at world market prices. Manufactures tended to be soft goods—their prices were negotiable and often adjusted to make bilateral payment flows balance.

Other countries with privileged affiliation with the CMEA included Algeria, Benin, Burma, Congo, Finland, Madagascar, Mali, Mexico, Nigeria, Seychelles, Syria, Tanzania and Zimbabwe. The Soviet Union also provided substantial economic aid and technical assistance to developing countries including Egypt, India, Iraq, Iran, Somalia and Turkey. It supported developing countries in calling for a New International Economic Order and backed the UN Charter of Economic Rights and Obligations of States adopted by the General Assembly in 1974.

==== Achievements of the socialist planned economies ====
In the officially sanctioned textbooks describing the socialist planned economies as they existed in the 1980s, it was claimed as follows:

- Class and national oppression had been totally eradicated.
- Unemployment, hunger, poverty, illiteracy and uncertainty about the future had been eliminated.
- Every citizen had a guaranteed right to work, rest, education, health care, abode and security in old age and maintenance in the event of disability.
- Material standards of living were rising steadily and everyone had free access to knowledge and to the values of world and national culture.
- Every citizen had a right in practice to take part in discussing and solving any problems in the life of the enterprise, region, republic and the country they lived in, including the rights to free speech, of assembly and to demonstrate.

Data collected by the United Nations of indicators of human development in the early 1990s show that a high level of social development was achieved in the former socialist planned economies of Central and Eastern Europe and the Commonwealth of Independent States (CEE/CIS). Life expectancy in the CEE/CIS area in the period 1985–1990 was 68 years, while for the countries of the Organization for Economic Cooperation and Development (OECD) it was 75 years. Infant mortality in the CEE/CIS area was 25 for every 1,000 live births in 1990, compared to 13 in the OECD area. In terms of education, the two areas enjoyed universal adult literacy and full enrolment of children in primary and secondary schools. For tertiary education, the CEE/CIS had 2,600 university students per 100,000 population, while in the OECD the comparable figure was 3,550 students. Overall enrolment at primary, secondary and tertiary levels was 75 percent in the CEE/CIS region and 82 percent in the OECD countries.

On housing the main problem was over-crowding rather than homelessness in the socialist planned economies. In the USSR the area of residential accommodation was 15.5 square meters per person by 1990 in urban areas but 15 percent of the population were without their own separate accommodation and had to live in communal apartments according to the 1989 census. Housing was generally of good quality in both the CEE/CIS region and in the OECD countries: 98 and 99 percent of the population in the OECD countries had access to safe drinking water and improved sanitation respectively, compared to 93 and 85 percent in the CEE/CIS area by 1990.

Unemployment did not exist officially in the socialist planned economies, though there were people between jobs and a fraction of unemployable people as a result of illness, disability or other problems, such as alcoholism. The proportion of people changing jobs was between 6 and 13 percent of the labour force a year according to employment data during the 1970s and 1980s in Central and Eastern Europe and the USSR. Labour exchanges were established in the USSR in 1967 to help enterprises re-allocate workers and provide information on job vacancies. Compulsory unemployment insurance schemes operated in Bulgaria, Eastern Germany and Hungary but the numbers claiming support as a result of losing their job through no fault of their own numbered a few hundred a year.

By 1988, GDP per person, measured at purchasing power parity in US dollars, was $7,519 in Russia and $6,304 for the USSR. The highest income was to be found in Slovenia ($10,663) and Estonia ($9,078) and the lowest in Albania ($1,386) and Tajikistan ($2,730). Across the whole CEE/CIS area, GDP per person was estimated at $6,162. This compared to the US with $20,651 and $16,006 for Germany in the same year. For the OECD area as a whole estimated GDP per person was $14,385. Thus, on the basis of IMF estimates, national income (GDP) per person in the CEE/CIS area was 43 percent of that in the OECD area.

==== Economic problems of the socialist planned economies ====
From the 1960s onwards, CMEA countries, beginning with East Germany, attempted "intensive" growth strategies, aiming to raise the productivity of labour and capital. However, in practice this meant that investment was shifted towards new branches of industry, including the electronics, computing, automotive and nuclear power sectors, leaving the traditional heavy industries dependent upon older technologies. Despite the rhetoric about modernization, innovation remained weak as enterprise managers preferred routine production that was easier to plan and brought them predictable bonuses. Embargoes on high technology exports organized through the US-supported CoCom arrangement hampered technology transfer. Enterprise managers also ignored inducements to introduce labour-saving measures as they wished to retain a reserve of personnel to be available to meet their production target by working at top speed when supplies were delayed.

Under conditions of "taut planning", the economy was expected to produce a volume of output higher than the reported capacity of enterprises and there was no "slack" in the system. Enterprises faced a resource constraint and hoarded labour and other inputs and avoided sub-contracting intermediate production activities, preferring to retain the work in-house. The enterprise, according to the theory promulgated by János Kornai, was constrained by its resources not by the demand for its goods and services; nor was it constrained by its finances since the government was not likely to shut it down if it failed to meet its financial targets. Enterprises in socialist planned economies operated within a "soft" budget constraint, unlike enterprises in capitalist market economies which are demand-constrained and operate within "hard" budget constraints, as they face bankruptcy if their costs exceed their sales. As all producers were working in a resource-constrained economy they were perpetually in short supply and the shortages could never be eliminated, leading to chronic disruption of production schedules. The effect of this was to preserve a high level of employment.

As the supply of consumer goods failed to match rising incomes (because workers still received their pay even if they were not fully productive), household savings accumulated, indicating, in the official terminology, "postponed demand". Western economists called this "monetary overhang" or "repressed inflation". Prices on the black market were several times higher than in the official price-controlled outlets, reflecting the scarcity and possible illegality of the sale of these items. Therefore, although consumer welfare was reduced by shortages, the prices households paid for their regular consumption were lower than would have been the case had prices been set at market-clearing levels.

Over the course of the 1980s it became clear that the CMEA area was "in crisis", although it remained viable economically and was not expected to collapse. The "extensive" growth model was retarding growth in the CMEA as a whole, with member countries dependent upon supplies of raw materials from the USSR and upon the Soviet market for sales of goods. The decline in growth rates reflected a combination of diminishing returns to capital accumulation and low innovation as well as micro-economic inefficiencies, which a high rate of saving and investment was unable to counter. The CMEA was supposed to ensure coordination of national plans but it failed even to develop a common methodology for planning which could be adopted by its member states. As each member state was reluctant to give up national self-sufficiency the CMEA's efforts to encourage specialization was thwarted. There were very few joint ventures and therefore little intra-enterprise technology transfer and trade, which in the capitalist world was often undertaken by trans-national corporations. The International Bank for Economic Cooperation had no means of converting a country's trade surplus into an option to buy goods and services from other CMEA members.

=== Transition to market economies ===
After the dissolution of the Soviet Union and the Eastern Bloc, many of the remaining socialist states presiding over centrally planned economies began introducing reforms that shifted their economies away from centralized planning. In Central and Eastern Europe and the USSR the transition from a planned economy to a market economy was accompanied by the transformation of the socialist mode of production to a capitalist mode of production. In Asia (China, Laos, North Korea and Vietnam) and in Cuba market mechanisms were introduced by the ruling communist parties and the planning system was reformed without systemic transformation.

The transformation from socialism to capitalism involved a political shift: from a people's democracy (see People's Republic and Communist state) with a constitutionally entrenched "leading role" for the communist and workers' parties in society to a liberal representative democracy with a separation of legislative, executive and judicial authorities and centres of private power that can act as a brake on the state's activity.

Vietnam adopted an economic model it formally titled the socialist-oriented market economy. This economic system is a form of mixed-economy consisting of state, private, co-operative and individual enterprises coordinated by the market mechanism. This system is intended to be transitional stage in the development of socialism.

==== Transition economies ====
The transformation of an economic system from a socialist planned economy to a capitalist market economy in Central and Eastern Europe, the former Soviet Union and Mongolia in the 1990s involved a series of institutional changes. These included:

- Control over the means of production was removed from the state through privatization and private property rights were re-established. In several countries property was restored to its former owners or their legal successors. If the actual property could not be returned the former owners received compensation. This occurred in East Germany, Czechoslovakia, Hungary and Estonia. In all the countries of the Commonwealth of Independent States, the government decided against restoration or compensation on the grounds that too much time had elapsed and in many cases compensation had already been made through bilateral treaties between the USSR and foreign governments representing the former owners. Voucher privatization in which citizens and workers in the enterprises received free or cheap shares was undertaken in most of the transition economies.
- The decision-making system was de-centralized through the ending of central planning and the privatization of enterprises. Work collectives and trade unions lost much of their influence in enterprise decision-making.
- Markets became the dominant coordination mechanism following price liberalization and the de-control of foreign trade that permitted more or less unrestricted importation of goods in 1990/92. Queues at retail outlets disappeared as did hoarded inventories at factories. Stock exchanges were established between 1990 and 1995. Anti-monopoly legislation was introduced. As workers lost their jobs or found their wages unpaid, informal labour markets sprang up along certain streets, particularly for construction trades.
- The incentive system was modified by the legalization of private enterprise and alteration to employment laws. A large informal sphere developed estimated at comprising 21 to 30 percent of official calculations of GDP.
- The organizational forms prevailing in the socialist planned economies were restructured by breaking up vertically integrated industrial and agricultural concerns and closing non-viable undertakings. The hardening of enterprise budget constraints was more significant in driving industrial restructuring than privatization according to some studies.
- The distribution system became more unequal as price controls on necessities were removed fuelling the growth of poverty among people on fixed incomes such as pensioners and the unemployed. Redistributive measures through taxation and social safety nets proved unable to counteract the growth of poverty and, at the other end of the income scale, the emergence of a rich business elite (see also business oligarch).
- The public choice mechanism was overhauled to rescind the communist party's leading role and introduce a liberal constitution entrenching civil rights and representative democracy in almost all transition economies except Belarus, Turkmenistan and Uzbekistan.

==== People's Republic of China ====
China embraced a socialist planned economy after the Communist victory in its Civil War. Private property and private ownership of capital were abolished, and various forms of wealth made subject to state control or to workers' councils. The Chinese economy broadly adopted a similar system of production quotas and full employment by fiat to the Russian model. The Great Leap Forward saw a remarkably large-scale experiment with rapid collectivisation of agriculture and other ambitious goals. Results were less than expected (e.g. there were food shortages and mass starvation) and the program was abandoned after three years. In the common program set up by the Chinese People's Political Consultative Conference in 1949, in effect the country's interim constitution, state capitalism meant an economic system of corporatism. It provided as follows: "Whenever necessary and possible, private capital shall be encouraged to develop in the direction of state capitalism".

In recent decades, China has opened its economy to foreign investment and to market-based trade, and has continued to experience strong economic growth. It has carefully managed the transition from a socialist planned economy to a market economy, officially referred to as the socialist commodity market economy which has been likened to state capitalism by some outside observers. The current Chinese economic system is characterized by state ownership combined with a strong private sector that privately owned enterprises that generate about 33% (People's Daily Online 2005) to over 50% of GDP in 2005, with a BusinessWeek article estimating 70% of GDP, a figure that might be even greater considering the Chengbao system. Some western observers note that the private sector is likely underestimated by state officials in calculation of GDP due to its propensity to ignore small private enterprises that are not registered. Most of the state and private sectors of economy are governed by free market practices, including a stock exchange for trading equity. The free-market is the arbitrator for most economic activity, which is left to the management of both state and private firms. A significant amount of privately owned firms exist, especially in the consumer service sector.

The state sector is concentrated in the commanding heights of the economy with a growing private sector engaged primarily in commodity production and light industry. Centralized directive planning based on mandatory output requirements and production quotas has been superseded by the free-market mechanism for most of the economy and directive planning is utilized in some large state industries. A major difference from the old planned economy is the privatization of state institutions. 150 state-owned enterprises remain and report directly to the central government, most having a number of subsidiaries. By 2008, these state-owned corporations had become increasingly dynamic largely contributing to the increase in revenue for the state. The state-sector led the economic recovery process and increased economic growth in 2009 after the financial crises.

Proponents of this model distinguish themselves from market socialists who believe that economic planning is unattainable, undesirable or ineffective at distributing goods, viewing the market as the solution rather than a temporary phase in development of a socialist planned economy. This type of economic system is defended from a Marxist–Leninist perspective which states that a socialist planned economy can only be possible after first establishing the necessary comprehensive commodity market economy, letting it fully develop until it exhausts its historical stage and gradually transforms itself into a planned economy.

==== Cuba ====
The Republic of Cuba under the leadership of Raúl Castro began from 2006 to encourage co-operatives, worker-ownership and self-employment in a move to reduce the central role of state enterprise and state management within the economy, with the goal of building a "deeper" or more co-operative form of socialism. By 2018, there were 429 co-operatives in Cuba, many of which were previously state-owned enterprises.

==== Vietnam ====
The Socialist Republic of Vietnam has pursued similar economic reforms to China, though less extensively, resulting in a socialist-oriented market economy, a mixed economy in which the state plays a dominant role intended to be a transitional phase in establishment of a socialist economy.

=== Social democratic mixed economies ===
Many of the industrialized, open countries of Western Europe experimented with one form of social democratic mixed economies or another during the 20th century. These include Britain (mixed economy and welfare state) from 1945 to 1979, France (state capitalism and indicative planning) from 1945 to 1982 under dirigisme, Sweden (social democratic welfare state) and Norway (state social democratic mixed economy) to the present. They are regarded as social democratic and reformist socialist experiments because they universally retained a wage-based economy and private ownership and control of the decisive means of production.

Nevertheless, these western European countries tried to restructure their economies away from a purely private capitalist model. Variations range from social democratic welfare states such as in Sweden to mixed economies where a major percentage of GDP comes from the state sector such as in Norway which ranks among the highest countries in quality of life and equality of opportunity for its citizens. Elements of these efforts persist throughout Europe, even if they have repealed some aspects of public control and ownership. They are typically characterized by the following features:

- Nationalization of key industries such as mining, oil, steel, energy and transportation. A common model is for a sector to be taken over by the state and then one or more state-owned enterprises set up for its day-to-day running. Advantages of nationalization include the ability of the state to direct investment in key industries, the distribution of state profits from nationalized industries for the overall national good, the ability to direct producers to social rather than market goals and greater control of the industries by and for the workers as well as the benefits and burdens of publicly funded research and development are extended to the wider populace.
- Redistribution of wealth, through both tax and spending policies that aim to reduce economic inequalities. Social democracies typically employ various forms of progressive taxation regarding wage and business income, wealth, inheritance, capital gains and property. On the spending side, a set of social policies typically provides free access to public services such as education, health care and child care, while subsidized access to housing, food, pharmaceutical goods, water supply, waste management and electricity is also common.
- Social security schemes where workers contribute to a mandatory public insurance program. The insurance typically include monetary provisions for retirement pensions and survivor benefits, permanent and temporary disabilities, unemployment and parental leave. Unlike private insurance, governmental schemes are based on public statutes and not contracts, so that contributions and benefits may change in time and are based on solidarity among participants. Its funding is done on an ongoing basis, without direct relationship with future liabilities.
- Minimum wages, employment protection and trade union recognition rights for the benefit of workers. The objectives of these policies are to guarantee living wages and help produce full employment. There are a number of different models of trade union protection which evolved, but they all guarantee the right of workers to form unions, negotiate benefits and participate in strikes. Germany appointed union representatives at high levels in all corporations and had much less industrial strife than the United Kingdom, whose laws encouraged strikes rather than negotiation.
- National planning for industrial development.
- Demand management in a Keynesian fashion to help ensure economic growth and employment.

==== State capitalism ====
Various social democratic mixed economies are state capitalist, consisting of large commercial state enterprises that operate according to the laws of capitalism and pursue profits, that have evolved in countries which have been influenced by various elected socialist political parties and their economic reforms. While these policies and reforms did not change the fundamental aspect of capitalism and non-socialist elements within these countries supported or often implemented many of these reforms themselves, the result has been a set of economic institutions that were at least partly influenced by socialist ideology.

===== India =====
After gaining independence from Britain, India adopted a broadly socialist-inspired approach to economic growth. Like other countries with a democratic transition to a mixed economy, it did not abolish private property in capital. India proceeded by nationalizing various large privately run firms, creating state-owned enterprises and redistributing income through progressive taxation in a manner similar to social democratic Western European nations than to planned economies such as the Soviet Union or China. Today, India is often characterized as having a free-market economy that combines economic planning with the free market. However, it did adopt a very firm focus on national planning with a series of broad five-year plans.

===== Norway =====
Modern Norwegian state capitalism has its origins in public ownership of the country's oil reserves and in the country's post-World War II social democratic reforms. The government of Norway has ownership stakes in many of the country's largest publicly listed companies, owning 37% of the Oslo stockmarket and operates the country's largest non-listed companies including Statoil and Statkraft. The government also operates a sovereign wealth fund, the Government Pension Fund of Norway, whose partial objective is to prepare Norway for a post-oil future.

===== Singapore =====
Singapore pursued a state-led model of economic development under the People's Action Party which initially adopted a Leninist approach to politics and a broad socialist model of economic development. Originally, there was also infighting between moderates and radicals, including a left-wing and communist wing in the party which saw many imprisoned. The socialist policies practised the PAP during its first few decades in power were of a pragmatic kind as characterized by its rejection of nationalization. Despite this, the PAP was a member of the Socialist International and still claimed to be a socialist party, pointing out its regulation of the private sector, state intervention in the economy and social policies as evidence of this. The prime minister Lee Kuan Yew also stated that he has been influenced by the democratic socialist British Labour Party.

Singapore's economy is dominated by state-owned enterprises and government-linked companies through Temasek Holdings which generate 60% of Singapore's GDP. Temasek Holdings operates like any other company in a market economy. Managers of the holding are rewarded according to profits with the explicit intention to cultivate an ownership mindset. The state also provides substantial public housing, free education and health and recreational services as well as comprehensive public transportation. Today, Singapore is often characterized as having a state capitalist economy that combines economic planning with the free market. While government-linked companies generate a majority of Singapore's GDP, moderate state planning in the economy has been reduced in recent decades. Nonetheless, while being the most right-wing of the Singaporean parties, the PAP has been described as centre-left and adopted a left tack in certain areas in order to remain electorally dominant.

===== Taiwan =====
Taiwan's economy has been classified as a state capitalist system influenced by its Leninist model of political control, with some Taiwanese economists referring to Taiwan's economy model as party-state capitalism, a legacy which still lingers in the decision-making process. Taiwan's economy includes a number of state-owned enterprises, but the Taiwanese state's role in the economy shifted from that of an entrepreneur to a minority investor in companies alongside the democratization agenda of the late 1980s.

=== Paris Commune ===
The Paris Commune was considered to be a prototype mode of economic and political organization for a future socialist society by Karl Marx. Private property in the means of production was abolished so that individuals and co-operative associations of producers owned productive property and introduced democratic measures where elected officials received no more in compensation than the average worker and could be recalled at any time. Anarchists also participated actively in the establishment of the Paris Commune. George Woodcock manifests that "a notable contribution to the activities of the Commune and particularly to the organization of public services was made by members of various anarchist factions, including the mutualists Courbet, Longuet, and Vermorel, the libertarian collectivists Varlin, Malon, and Lefrangais, and the bakuninists Elie and Elisée Reclus and Louise Michel".

=== Social ownership and peer-to-peer production ===
Various forms of socialist organization based on co-operative decision making, workplace democracy and in some cases, production directly for use, have existed within the broader context of the capitalist mode of production since the Paris Commune. New forms of socialist institutional arrangements began to take form at the end of the 20th century with the advancement and proliferation of the internet and other tools that allow for collaborative decision-making.

Michel Bauwens identifies the emergence of the open software movement and peer production as an emergent alternative mode of production to the capitalist economy that is based on collaborative self-management, common ownership of resources, and the (direct) production of use-values through the free cooperation of producers who have access to distributed capital. Commons-based peer production generally involves production with no aim to profit directly, but freely contribute to a project relying upon an open common pool of resources. Production is carried out directly for use— ex. open source software is produced solely for its use-value. Wikipedia, being based on collaboration and cooperation and freely associated individuals, has been cited as a template for how socialism might operate. This is understood by some as a modern example of what the Paris Commune—a template for possible future organization—was to Marx in his time. Others, like Stefan Meretz, believe that commons-based peer production transcends socialism, no only capitalism.

==== Socialist Federal Republic of Yugoslavia ====
The Socialist Federal Republic of Yugoslavia pursued a socialist economy based on autogestion or worker self-management. Rather than implementing a centrally planned economy, Yugoslavia developed a market socialist system where enterprises and firms were socially owned rather than publicly owned by the state. In these organizations, the management was elected directly by the workers in each firm, and were later organized according to Edvard Kardelj's theory of associated labor.

==== Self-managed enterprises ====
The Mondragon Corporation, a federation of cooperatives in the Basque region of Spain, organizes itself as an employee-owned, employee-managed enterprise. Similar styles of decentralized management which embrace cooperation and collaboration in place of traditional hierarchical management structures have been adopted by various private corporations such as Cisco Systems. Unlike Mondragon, Cisco remains firmly under private ownership. More fundamentally, employee-owned, self-managed enterprises still operate within the broader context of capitalism and are subject to the accumulation of capital and profit-loss mechanism.

=== Anarchist Spain ===
In Spain, the national anarcho-syndicalist trade union Confederación Nacional del Trabajo initially refused to join a popular front electoral alliance and abstention by CNT supporters led to a right wing election victory. In 1936, the CNT changed its policy and anarchist votes helped bring the popular front back to power. Months later, the former ruling class responded with an attempted coup causing the Spanish Civil War (1936–1939). In response to the army rebellion, an anarchist-inspired movement of peasants and workers, supported by armed militias, took control of Barcelona and of large areas of rural Spain where they collectivised the land.

Even before the fascist victory in 1939, the anarchists were losing ground in a bitter struggle with the Stalinists, who controlled the distribution of military aid to the Republican cause from the Soviet Union. The events known as the Spanish Revolution was a workers' social revolution that began during the outbreak of the Spanish Civil War in 1936 and resulted in the widespread implementation of anarchist and more broadly libertarian socialist organizational principles throughout various portions of the country for two to three years, primarily Catalonia, Aragon, Andalusia, and parts of the Levante. Much of Spain's economy was put under worker control and in anarchist strongholds such as Catalonia, the figure was as high as 75%, although it was lower in areas with heavy Communist Party of Spain influence as the Soviet-allied party actively resisted attempts at collectivization enactment. Factories were run through worker committees, agrarian areas became collectivised and run as libertarian communes. Anarchist historian Sam Dolgoff estimated that about eight million people participated directly or at least indirectly in the Spanish Revolution which he claimed "came closer to realizing the ideal of the free stateless society on a vast scale than any other revolution in history".

== Criticism ==
The neoclassical view is that there is a lack of incentive, not a lack of information in a planned economy. They argue that within a socialist planned economy there is a lack of incentive to act on information. Therefore, the crucial missing element is not so much information as the Austrian School argued as it is the motivation to act on information.

== See also ==
- Basic income
- Complexity economics
- Economic planning
- Planned economy
- Public ownership
- Fair trade
- Feminist economics
- Gandhian economics
- History of economic thought
- Job guarantee
- Labour economics
- List of socialist economists
- Post-capitalism
- Socialism
- Socialist democracy
- Socialist calculation debate
- Scientific socialism
- Welfare economics
- Workers' control
- Why Socialism? - an article written by Albert Einstein which presented a critique of modern capitalism and advocated for a planned economy.
