= Marxist socialism =

Marxist socialism may refer to:

- Marxism
- Scientific socialism
- Socialism (Marxism)
