= Free economy =

Free economy may refer to:

- Freiwirtschaft
- Market economy
- Calculation in kind, also known as a money-free economy
