= Pat Devine =

Pat Devine is a radical socialist economist concerned mainly with industrial economics and comparative economic systems.

Devine made one of the most thorough descriptions of a future post-capitalistic economy which is based upon social ownership of the means of production by those affected by the use of it. The allocation of consumer and capital goods would be made by a form of decentralized participatory economic planning called negotiated coordination of those at the most localised level of economic production. This model is notable for specifying an array of social ownership rights and an analytic distinction between market forces and market relations. Another key aspect of Devine’s work has been a close reading of the notorious economic calculation debate and later attempts to offer a response to the objections by the Austrian school of economic theory. Similarly, Devine's work on the subject of industrial planning has largely constituted an extended critique of the Austrian theory of entrepreneurship. In this vein, Devine has argued that "a major weakness in the modern Austrian School's emphasis on the need for tacit knowledge to be socially mobilised by entrepreneurs participating in the market process is that participation is restricted to those with access to capital, thus ignoring the tacit knowledge of the majority of people".

Devine is a joint author of the book An Introduction to Industrial Economics and author of Democracy and Economic Planning. He and collaborators Fikret Adaman and Begum Ozkaynak are particularly notable for their elaboration of a visionary socialist model that they call participatory planning. The most significant influences on Devine's economic thought were Karl Marx and the Marxian tradition associated with Antonio Gramsci as well as the economo-anthropologic theories of Karl Polanyi.

As of 2008, Devine is an honorary research fellow at Manchester University. He began his academic studies in economics at Balliol College, Oxford.

== See also ==
- Robin Hahnel
- Industrial Economics
- Participatory Economics
- Inclusive Democracy
- Post-Autistic Economics
- Participatory democracy
- Participatory politics

== Select bibliography ==
=== Articles in journals and books ===
- "Inter-Regional Variations in the Degree of Inequality of Income Distribution: The United Kingdom", 1949-65 as P J Devine Journal of The Manchester School of Economic & Social Studies, 1969, vol. 37, issue 2, pages 141-59
- “Inflation and Marxist Theory”, Marxism Today, March, 1974, pp. 70–92. as P.Devine.
- "Market Socialism or Participatory Planning?", Review of Radical Political Economics (1992)
- “Socialist Renewal: Lessons from the ‘Calculation’ Debate”, Studies in Political Economy, 1994.(with Fikret Adaman).
- “The Economic Calculation Debate: Lessons for socialists”, Cambridge Journal of Economics, 1996.(with Fikret Adaman)
- “A Response to Professor Foss”, Studies in Political Economy, 1996 (with Fikret Adaman)
- “On the Economic Theory of Socialism”, New Left Review, 1997. (with Fikret Adaman).
- “The ‘Conflict Theory of Inflation” Revisited”, in Toporowski, J. (ed.), Political Economy and the New Capitalism, London: Routledge. 2000.
- “A Response to Professor Hodgson”, Economy and Society, 2001. (with Fikret Adaman)
- “Participatory Planning Through Negotiated Coordination”, Science and Society, 66(1):72-85. Special Issue: Building Socialism Theoretically. Alternatives to Capitalism and the Invisible Hand. Guest editor and multiple contributions.(2002):
- "A Reconsideration of the Theory of Entrepreneurship: a participatory approach", Review of Political Economy, 1465-3982, Volume 14, Issue 3, 2002, Pages 329 – 355 (with Fikret Adaman).
- “Reinstituting the Economic Process: (Re)embedding the economy in society and nature”, International Review of Sociology, 2003. (with Fikret Adaman and Begüm Özkaynak)
- “Whither Ecological Economics?,” International Journal of. Environment and Pollution, 2002 18 (4), 317-335 (with Dan Rigby and Begum Ozkaynak)
- “Operationalising Strong Sustainability: Definitions, Methodologies and Outcomes,” Environmental Values, 13 (3), 279-303 (SSCI). (2004). (With Begum Ozkaynak, B, and Dan Rigby)
- “The Promise of Participatory Planning: A Rejoinder to Hodgson”, Economy and Society, 35(1):141-7, 2006. (with Fikret Adaman.)

=== Books ===
- "An Introduction to Industrial Economics", George Allen & Unwin Ltd., London, 1974 authors: PJ Devine, RM Jones, N. Lee, and WJ Tyson,
- "Democracy and economic planning: the political economy of a self- governing society", Cambridge: Polity Press, 1988. (as PJ Devine).
- "Competitiveness, Subsidiarity and Industrial Policy". Editors: Pat J. Devine; Yannis S. Katsoulacos; Roger Sugden. 1996. ISBN 978-0-415-13985-4 (hardback)
- "What On Earth Is To Be Done?" (Manchester, Red Green Study Group). Authors: P. Devine with T. Benton, N. Gotts, P. Hoggett, R. Kuper, E. Lieven, T. Martin, J. Morrissey, C. New, M. Prior, D. Purdy, R. Simon, D. Thompson, H. Wainwright (1995)
- "Economy and Society: Money, Capitalism and Transition", co-edited with Fikret Adaman, Montreal: Blackrose, 2001.
- "Feelbad Britain: How to Make it Better", Lawrence & Wishart Ltd, Mar 2009. editors: Pat Devine, Andrew Pearmain and David Purdy (Editor)

Book reviews

- "Parecon: Life After Capitalism", Historical Materialism (2007) 15:210-217, April 1, 2007.
