= Socialization (Marxism) =

Economic process

In the theoretical works of Karl Marx and Friedrich Engels and subsequent Marxist writers, socialization (or the socialization of production) is the process of transforming the act of producing and distributing goods and services from a solitary to a social relationship and collective endeavor. With the development of capitalism, production becomes centralized in firms and increasingly mechanized in contrast to the pre-capitalist modes of production where the act of production was a largely solitary act performed by individuals. Socialization occurs due to centralization of capital in industries where there are increasing returns to scale and a deepening of the division of labor and the specialization in skills necessary for increasingly complex forms of production and value creation. Progressive socialization of the forces of production under capitalism eventually comes into conflict with the persistence of relations of production based on private property; this contradiction between socialized production and private appropriation of the social product forms the impetus for the socialization of property relations (socialism).

In Marx's critique of political economy, as capitalism develops a contradiction emerges between the increasingly socialized act of production and the private ownership and appropriation of surplus value. Classical Marxist theory posits that this contradiction will intensify to a point where socialization of surplus value appropriation in the form of social ownership of the means of production will be necessitated, resulting in a transition from capitalism to socialism.

== Definition ==
Karl Marx defined socialization as a general phenomenon where the labor process comes to embody the capabilities and constraints developed in society as opposed to private experiences, with objective socialization of the forces of production being the deepening of the social division of labor including specialization of skills and deepening interdependence between industries and regions.

== In Marxist theory ==
Socialization is a process that begins to take place in capitalism as large-scale manufacturing based on a vertical division of labor displaces "cottage industry" - the small-scale production shops, guilds and family-run businesses that existed in feudal economies. This process transforms the act of production into an increasingly social and collective process involving planning and greater coordination among producers, but appropriation of the social product in the form of private profit continues to be a private affair by investors and owners of the enterprise. Furthermore, exchange of the commodities produced is the private act of a small group of capitalists or an individual owner. As the process of socialization expands, a contradiction between the socialized nature of production and the individual nature of appropriation of the surplus product arises, coinciding with the obsolescence of the functions performed by the capitalists (the private owners).

The socialization and centralization of industry and capital under capitalism lays the foundations for a socialist economy. Socialism entails ownership of the socialized means of production by the workers engaged in the production either in the form of worker ownership or social ownership by all of society. The establishment of social ownership over the means of production resolves the contradiction between social production and private exchange/appropriation under capitalism.

Karl Marx envisioned socialization under socialism as involving an expansion of self-management on the part of workers over their work processes, in contrast to the rigid hierarchy and bureaucracy that characterizes traditional capitalist enterprises. As workers gain more autonomy, they also gain more collective decision-making power and control over their work processes. Socialization of the ownership of the means of production is different from nationalization, which can, but usually does not imply the socialization of the workplace. In a capitalist economy, socialization is limited because the socialized enterprise continues to operate in a commodity economy under the capitalist laws of motion. Socialization therefore takes a different form in the capitalist mode of production than in the socialist mode of production.

== See also ==
- Capital deepening
- Commons-based peer production
- Critique of political economy
- Division of labor
- Relations of production
- Social ownership
- Socialist mode of production
- Socialization (the general sociological definition)
- Social peer-to-peer production
