= Production for use =

Economic concept

Production for use is a phrase referring to the principle of economic organization and production taken as a defining criterion for a socialist economy. It is held in contrast to production for profit. This criterion is used to distinguish socialism from capitalism, and is one of the fundamental defining characteristics of socialism, though it isn't a characteristic of more contemporary proposals for profit-oriented market socialism.

This principle is broad and can refer to an array of different configurations that vary based on the underlying theory of economics employed. In its classic definition, production for use implied an economic system whereby the law of value and law of accumulation no longer directed economic activity, whereby a direct measure of utility and value is used in place of the abstractions of the price system, money, and capital. Alternative conceptions of socialism that do not use the profit system such as the Lange model, use instead a price system and monetary calculation.

The main socialist critique of the capitalist profit is that the accumulation of capital ("making money") becomes increasingly detached from the process of producing economic value, leading to waste, inefficiency, and social problems. Essentially, it is a distortion of proper accounting, based on the assertion of the law of value instead of the "real" costs of production, objectively determined outside of social relations.

== Exposition ==
Production for use refers to an arrangement whereby the production of goods and services is carried out ex ante (directly) for their utility (also called "use-value"). The implication is that the value of economic output would be based on use-value or a direct measure of utility as opposed to exchange-value; because economic activity would be undertaken to directly satisfy economic demands and human needs, the productive apparatus would directly serve individual and social needs. This is contrasted with production for exchange of the produced good or service in order to profit, where production is subjected to the perpetual accumulation of capital, a condition where production is only undertaken if it generates profit, implying an ex post or indirect means of satisfying economic demand. The profits system is oriented toward generating a profit to be reinvested into the economy (and the constant continuation of this process), the result being that society is structured around the need for a perpetual accumulation of capital. In contrast, production for use means that the accumulation of capital is not a compulsory driving force in the economy, and by extension, the core process which society and culture revolves around. Production for profit, in contrast, is the dominant mode of production in the modern world system, equivocates "profitability" and "productivity" and presumes that the former always equates to the latter.

Some thinkers, including the Austrian philosopher and political economist Otto Neurath, have used the phrase "socialization" to refer to the same concept of "production for use". In Neurath's phraseology, "total socialization" involves calculation in kind in place of financial calculation and a system of planning in place of market-based allocation of economic goods. Alternative conceptions exist in the form of market socialism.

== Usage ==
- Karl Marx referred to the "production of use-values" as a feature of any economic mode of production, but characterized capitalism as a mode of production that subjugated the production of use-value for the self-expansion of capital (i.e., capital accumulation or production for profit). In contrast, socialism was vaguely defined as a system based on the direct production of use-value free of the process of continuous capital accumulation. In a "future society, in which class antagonism will have ceased" (communism) "use will no longer be determined by the minimum time of production; but the time of production devoted to different articles will be determined by the degree of their social utility."
- Friedrich Engels wrote in Anti-Dühring that in the socialist mode of production the law of value will no longer apply and money will no longer be the measure of the exchange value of commodities. It would still be necessary an economic planning, which will ultimately be determined by the "useful effects of the various articles of consumption, compared with one another and with the quantities of labour required for their production" without the need for the concept of "value."
- Eugene V. Debs popularly used the phrase when running for president of the United States in 1912, stating that capitalism is founded upon production for profit, and in contrast, socialism is postulated upon production for use.
- Norman Thomas, a presidential candidate in the United States for the Socialist Party of America in the six elections from 1928 to 1948, contrasted socialism with capitalism by stating that socialism is based on production for use and an end to the profit system.
- Upton Sinclair devised an elaborate production-for-use plan, including confiscation and repurposing of idle factories and farms, that was central to his unsuccessful End Poverty in California (EPIC) campaign for governor in 1934.
- Friedrich Hayek defined socialism as "the common ownership of the means of production and their 'employment for use, not for profit'", associating the rise of the welfare state by social democrats in post-World War II Europe as a rejection of socialism in the technical sense.

== Description ==
Proponents of socialism argue that production for profit (i.e., capitalism) does not always satisfy the economic needs of people, especially the working-class, because capital only invests in production when it is profitable. This fails to satisfy demand, that is the needs of people who lack basic necessities but have insufficient purchasing power to acquire these needs in a manner that would be profitable for businesses. This results in a number of inefficiencies: unsold items are rarely given away to people who need but can’t afford them, unemployed workers are not utilized to produce such services, and resources are expended on occupations that serve no other purpose than to support the accumulation of profit instead of being utilized to provide useful goods and services. For example, the United States housing bubble resulted in an overproduction of housing units that could not be sold at a profit, despite there being sufficient demand and need for housing units.

Production for use in some form was the historically dominant modality until the initial primitive accumulation of capital.

Economic planning is not synonymous with production for use. Planning is essential in modern globalised production both within enterprises and within states. Planning to maximize profitability (i.e., within industries and private corporations) or to improve the efficiency of capital accumulation in the capitalist macro-economy (i.e. monetary policy, fiscal policy and industrial policy) does not change the fundamental criteria and need to generate a financial profit to be reinvested into the economy. A more recent critique of production for profit is that it fails spectacularly to address issues such as externalities which the board and management of a for profit enterprise are often under a fiduciary responsibility to ignore if they harm or conflict with the shareholders' profit motives.

=== Criticisms of production for profit ===
Some socialists suggest a number of irrational outcomes occur from capitalism and the need to accumulate capital when capitalist economies reach a point in development whereby investment accumulates at a greater rate than growth of profitable investment opportunities. Many theories, such as the Buddhist Economics, the Appropriate technology, and the Jevons Paradox, have demonstrated that the accumulation of capital due to maximization of profit, detaches Society from the process of producing social and economic value, leading to waste, inefficiency and underlying social issues.

Planned obsolescence is a strategy used by businesses to generate demand for the continual consumption required for capitalism to sustain itself. The negative effect planned obsolescence has to environment (mainly), is due to constantly increasing natural material extraction to produce the goods and services to satisfy a never ending added demand, linked with a non-caring disposal of end products.

The creation of industries, projects and services comes about for no other purpose than generating profit, economic growth or maintaining employment. The drive to create such industries arises from the need to absorb the savings in the economy, and thus, to maintain the accumulation of capital. This can take the form of corporatization and commercialization of public services, i.e., transforming them into profit-generating industries to absorb investment, or the creation and expansion of sectors of the economy that do not produce any economic value by themselves because they deal only with exchange-related activities, sectors such as financial services. This can contribute to the formation of economic bubbles, crises and recessions.

For socialists, the solution to these problems entails a reorientation of the economic system from production for profit and the need to accumulate capital to a system where production is adjusted to meet individual and social demands directly.

=== Contrasted with state capitalism ===
As an objective criterion for socialism, production for use can be used to evaluate the socialistic content of the composition of former and existing economic systems. For example, an economic system that is dominated by nationalized firms organized around the production of profit, whether this profit is retained by the firm or paid to the government as a dividend payment, would be a state capitalist economy. In such a system, the organizational structure of the firm remains similar to a private-sector firm; non-financial costs are externalized because profitability is the criterion for production, so that the majority of the economy remains essentially capitalist despite the formal title of public ownership. This has led many socialists to categorize the current Chinese economic system as party-state capitalism.

The economy of the Soviet Union was based upon capital accumulation for reinvestment and production for profit; the difference between it and Western capitalism was that the USSR achieved this through nationalized industry and state-directed investment, with the eventual goal of building a socialist society based upon production for use and self-management. Vladimir Lenin described the USSR economy as "state-monopoly capitalism" and did not consider it to be socialism. During the 1965 Liberman Reforms, the USSR re-introduced profitability as a criterion for industrial enterprises. Other views argue the USSR evolved into a non-capitalist and non-socialist system characterized by control and subordination of society by party and government officials who coordinated the economy; this can be called bureaucratic collectivism.

== Social production and peer-to-peer processes ==
Michel Bauwens identifies the emergence of the open software movement and peer-to-peer production as an emergent alternative mode of production to the capitalist economy that is based on collaborative self-management, common ownership of resources, and the (direct) production of use-values through the free cooperation of producers who have access to distributed capital.

Commons-based peer production generally involves developers who produce goods and services with no aim to profit directly, but freely contribute to a project relying upon an open common pool of resources and software code. In both cases, production is carried out directly for use - software is produced solely for their use-value.

== Valuation and calculation ==
Multiple forms of valuation have been proposed to govern production in a socialist economy, to serve as a unit of account and to quantify the usefulness of an object in socialism. These include valuations based on labor-time, the expenditure of energy in production, or disaggregated units of physical quantities.

=== Physical quantities ===
The classic formulation of socialism involved replacing the criteria of value from money (exchange-value) to physical utility (use-value), to be quantified in terms of physical quantities (Calculation in kind and Input-Output analysis) or some natural unit of accounting, such as energy accounting.

Input-output model analysis is based upon directly determining the physical quantities of goods and services to be produced and allocating economic inputs accordingly; thus production targets are pre-planned. Soviet economic planning was overwhelmingly focused on material balances - balancing the supply of economic inputs with planned output targets.

=== Marginal cost ===
Oskar Lange formulated a mechanism for the direct allocation of capital goods in a socialist economy that was based on the marginal cost of production. Under a capitalist economy, managers of firms are ordered and legally required to base production around profitability, and in theory, competitive pressure creates a downward pressure on profits and forces private businesses to be responsive to demands of consumers, indirectly approximating production for use. In the Lange Model, the firms would be publicly owned and the managers would be tasked with setting the price of output to its marginal cost, thereby achieving pareto efficiency through direct allocation.

=== Cybernetics ===
Cybernetics, the use of computers to coordinate production in an optimal fashion, has been suggested for socialist economies. Oskar Lange, rejecting his earlier proposals for market socialism, argued that the computer is more efficient than the market process at solving the multitude of simultaneous equations required for allocating economic inputs efficiently (either in terms of physical quantities or monetary prices).

Salvador Allende's socialist-led government developed Project Cybersyn, a form of decentralized economic planning though the experimental computer-led viable system model of computed organisational structure of autonomous operative units though an algedonic feedback setting and bottom-up participative decision-making by the Cyberfolk component. The project was disbanded after the 1973 Chilean coup d'état.

=== Free market ===
Based on the perspective that the law of value would continue to operate in a socialist economy, it is argued that a market purged of "parasitical and wasteful elements" in the form of private ownership of the means of production and the distortions that arise from the concentration of power and wealth in a class of capitalists would enable the market to operate efficiently without distortions. Simply replacing the antagonistic interests between capitalists and workers in enterprises would alter the orientation of the economy from private profit to meeting the demands of the community as firms would seek to maximize the benefits to the member-workers, who would as a whole comprise society. Cooperative economist Jaroslav Vanek suggests that worker self-management and collective ownership of enterprises operating in a free-market would allow for a genuine free-market economy free of the market-distorting, monopolistic tendencies and antagonistic interests that emerge from private ownership over production.

== In popular culture ==
In the Howard Hawks-directed 1940 film His Girl Friday, written by Charles Lederer based on the 1928 Broadway play The Front Page by Ben Hecht and Charles MacArthur, reporter Hildy Johnson (Rosalind Russell) interviews accused killer Earl Williams (John Qualen) in jail to write his story for her newspaper. Williams is despondent and confused, and easily accepts it when Johnson leads him into an account of the events preceding the killing, which revolves around the desperate out-of-work man's hearing the expression "production for use" and transferring the concept in his mind to the gun he had: it was made for use, and he used it. This is the story about Williams that Johnson writes up, to the admiration of the other reporters covering the case. This version of Earl Williams' motivations differs significantly from that presented in the original stage play and the first film adaptation of it from 1931. In those scripts, the killer was a committed anarchist who had definite political reasons for the shooting, and did not need to be influenced by a stronger personality into a false narrative.

== See also ==
- Calculation in kind
- Capital accumulation
- Economic planning
- Lange model
- Law of value
- Market failure
- Mode of production
- Planned obsolescence
- Post-capitalism
- Socialist calculation debate
- Socialist economics
- Socialist critique of capitalism
- Socialist mode of production
- Socialization (economics)
- Technocracy movement
- Time-based currency
- Use-value
