= Calculation in kind =

Method of appraising and accounting which replaces money with use value

Calculation in kind or calculation in-natura is a way of valuating resources and a system of accounting that uses disaggregated physical magnitudes as opposed to a common unit of calculation.

In a pre-capitalist economy, calculation in kind refers to an economic system where planning, resource allocation, and valuation are based on physical quantities of goods and labor hours rather than monetary values, prices, or profit margins. Such economies, often characterized by feudal, communal, or subsistence-based structures, do not focus on profit-driven expansion but rather on maintaining social status and direct consumption.

Max Weber defined "calculation in kind" (Naturalrechnung) as an economic system that operates without the use of money, market prices, or capital accounting. In his analysis, this method is characteristic of premodern, traditional, or primitive societies, where economic actions are oriented toward direct utility (substantive rationality) rather than monetary profit (formal rationality).

As the basis for a socialist economy, it was proposed to replace money and financial calculation. In an in-kind economy, products are produced for their use values (their utility) and accounted in physical terms. By contrast, in money-based economies, commodities are produced for their exchange value and accounted in monetary terms.

Calculation in kind would quantify the utility of an object directly without recourse to a general unit of calculation. This differs from other proposed methods of socialist calculation, such as Taylor-Lange accounting prices, and the use of labor time as a measure of cost.

Calculation in kind was strongly advocated by the positivist philosopher and political economist Otto Neurath when employed by the Bavarian Soviet Republic. This led to a discussion in the early 1920s, in which much of the discussion about socialism centered on whether economic planning should be based on physical quantities or monetary accounting. Neurath was the most forceful advocate of physical planning (economic planning using calculation-in-kind) in contrast to market socialist neoclassical economists who advocated use of notional prices computed by solving simultaneous equations. Austrian school critics of socialism, particularly Ludwig von Mises, based his critique of socialism on the calculation problem.

The most prolific modern proponent of calculation in kind is the Scottish computer scientist Paul Cockshott who differs from Neurath in that he advocates the use of labour vouchers to set a scalar restraint on consumption.

Proponents of in-kind calculation argue that the use of a common medium like money distorts information about the utility of an object. Socialists in favor of calculation in kind argued that, in a system of in-kind calculation, waste associated with the monetary system would be eliminated, and in particular objects would no longer be desired for functionally useless purposes like resale and speculation – they would only be desired for their use-value.

== See also ==
- Input-output planning
- Material balances
- Natural capital accounting
- Post-capitalism
- Post-scarcity economy
- Production for use
- Socialist calculation debate
- Socialist economics
- Socialist mode of production
- Technological rationality
- Time-based currency
- Utility
- Value (economics)
