= Static efficiency =

Economic Theory

Static efficiency belongs within neoclassical economics, which argues that explicit theoretical rationale of liberalisation is to achieve an efficient (static) allocation of resources. In order to achieve this situation, there are three central assumptions within neoclassical economics that are indispensable for achieving an optimal allocation. These assumptions include that people are rational, both individuals and firms maximise utility, and everybody has full and relevant information, which they act upon independently.

Graphically, static efficiency is obtained when the net benefit is maximised. This means that the marginal benefit (MB) is equal to the marginal cost (MC).

== Forms ==
There are two main types of static efficiency: productive efficiency and allocative efficiency. Productive efficiency is reached when goods and services are produced with an optimal combination of inputs, resulting in the maximum output at the lowest costs. A firm is said to be productively efficieducing at the lowest point on the average cost curve. This is where marginal cost meets average cost. Allocative efficiency takes into account the preferences of the consumers and the efficient allocation of resources. Graphically this point is reached when price is equal to marginal cost. At this point there is no deadweight loss, and the social surplus (consumer surplus + producer surplus) is maximized.

It is possible that productive efficiency is reached while there is no allocative efficiency at that same point in time.

== Static vs. dynamic ==
Static efficiency is efficiency in terms of the refinement of existing products, processes or capabilities. On the contrary, dynamic efficiency takes into account the development of new products, processes, and capabilities. Achieving static efficiency may not be consistent with achieving dynamic efficiency. Monopoly power can, for example, undermine static efficiency; but the resulting accumulation of wealth can promote improved dynamic efficiency if it is used to finance increased investment, thereby promote accelerated rates of growth.

== See also ==
- Dynamic efficiency
