= Material balance planning =

Method of economic planning

Material balances are a method of economic planning where material supplies are accounted for in natural units (as opposed to using monetary accounting) and used to balance the supply of available inputs with targeted outputs. Material balancing involves taking a survey of the available inputs and raw materials in an economy and then using a balance sheet to balance the inputs with output targets specified by industry to achieve a balance between supply and demand. This balance is used to formulate a plan for resource allocation and investment in a national economy.

The method of material balances is contrasted with the method of input-output planning developed by Wassily Leontief.

== Role in Soviet-type planning ==
Material balance planning was the principal tool of planning employed by Soviet-type planned economies and was Gosplan's major function in the Soviet Union. This system emerged in a haphazard manner during the collectivisation era. It prioritized rapid growth and industrialization. Although material balance became an established part of Soviet planning, it never completely replaced the role of financial calculation in the economy.

In the economy of the Soviet Union, Gosplan's major function was the formulation of material balances and national plans for the economy. In 1973, supplies for 70% of all industrial production representing 1,943 of the economy's most important items had their balances worked out by Gosplan. Gossnab and the various economic ministries were responsible for the determination of the suppliers and recipients of supplies in the Soviet economy.

Material balance planning encompassed non-labor inputs (the distribution of consumer goods and allocation of labor was left to market mechanisms). In a material balance sheet, the major sources of supply and demand are drawn up in a table that achieves a rough balance between the two through an iterative process. Successive iterations corrected imbalances with previous iterations - for example, deficits signaled the need for extra output in the successive iteration of the balance. The Soviet economy suffered endemic supply problems stemming from the crudity of the material balance technique, where balances were highly aggregated and thus imprecise.

Beginning in the early 1960s, the USSR considered moving away from material balance planning in favor of developing an interlinked computerized system of resource allocation based on the principles of cybernetics using the proposed OGAS plan drawn up by Victor Glushkov. This development was seen as the basis for moving toward optimal planning that could form the basis of a more highly developed form of socialist economy based on informational innovation. This was seen as a logical progression given that the material balances system was geared toward rapid industrialization, which the Soviet Union had already achieved in the preceding decades. But by the early 1970s the idea of transcending the status quo was abandoned by the Soviet leadership.

== See also ==
- Calculation in kind
- Economic planning
- Gosplan
- Input-output model
- Material Product System
- Planned economy
- Socialist economics
- Soviet-type economic planning
- Supply-side economics
