= Participatory economics =

Type of economic system

Participatory economics, (Note: a.k.a. participism) often abbreviated parecon, is an economic system based on participatory decision making as the primary economic mechanism for allocation in society. In the system, the say in decision-making is proportional to the impact on a person or group of people. Participatory economics is a form of a socialist decentralized planned economy involving the collective ownership of the means of production. It is a proposed alternative to contemporary capitalism and centralized planning. This economic model is primarily associated with political theorist Michael Albert and economist Robin Hahnel, who describes participatory economics as an anarchist economic vision.

The underlying values that parecon seeks to implement are: equity, solidarity, diversity, workers' self-management, efficiency (defined as accomplishing goals without wasting valued assets), and sustainability. The institutions of parecon include workers' and consumers' councils utilising self-managerial methods for decision-making, balanced job complexes, remuneration based on individual effort, and wide decentralized planning. In parecon, self-management constitutes a replacement for the mainstream conception of economic freedom, which Albert and Hahnel argue by its very vagueness has allowed it to be abused by capitalist ideologues.

Albert and Hahnel claim that participatory economics has been practiced to varying degrees during the Russian Revolution of 1917, Spanish Revolution of 1936, and occasionally in South America.

== Work and distribution ==
=== Balanced job complexes ===
A balanced job complex is a collection of tasks within a given workplace that is balanced for its equity and empowerment implications against all other job complexes in that workplace.

=== Compensation for effort and sacrifice (principle for distribution) ===
Albert and Hahnel argue that it is inequitable and ineffective to compensate people on the basis of luck (e.g. skills or talents that owe to their birth or heredity), or by virtue of workers' productivity (as measured by the value of the goods they produce). Therefore, the primary principle of participatory economics is to reward workers for their effort and sacrifice. Additionally, participatory economics would provide exemptions from the compensation for effort principle.

The starting point for the income of all workers in a participatory economy is an equal share of the social product. From this point, incomes for personal expenditures and consumption rights for public goods can be expected to diverge by small degrees, reflecting the choices that individuals make in between work and leisure time, and the level of danger and difficulty of a job as judged by their immediate workplace peers.

== Allocation of resource ==
Albert and Hahnel argue that decentralized planning can achieve Pareto optimum, and does so under less restrictive assumptions than free market models (see: the first fundamental theorem of welfare economics). Their model incorporates both public goods and externalities, whereas markets do not achieve Pareto optimality when including these conditions.

=== Facilitation boards ===
In a proposed participatory economy, key information relevant to converging on an economic plan would be made available by Iteration Facilitation Boards (IFBs), which, based on proposals from worker/consumer councils and economic data, present indicative prices and economic projections at each round of the planning process.

The IFB has no decision-making authority. In theory, the IFB's activity can consist mainly of computers performing the (agreed upon) algorithms for adjusting prices and forecasts, with little human involvement.

== Motivations (opposition to central planning and capitalism) ==
Robin Hahnel has argued that "participatory planning is not central planning", stating "The procedures are completely different and the incentives are completely different. And one of the important ways in which it is different from central planning is that it is incentive compatible, that is, actors have an incentive to report truthfully rather than an incentive to misrepresent their capabilities or preferences." Unlike historical examples of central planning, the parecon proposal advocates the use and adjustment of price information reflecting marginal social opportunity costs and benefits as integral elements of the planning process. Hahnel has argued emphatically against Milton Friedman's a priori tendency to deny the possibility of alternatives:

Friedman assumes away the best solution for coordinating economic activities. He simply asserts "there are only two ways of coordinating the economic activities of millions—central direction involving the use of coercion—and voluntary cooperation, the technique of the marketplace." [...] a participatory economy can permit all to partake in economic decision making in proportion to the degree they are affected by outcomes. Since a participatory system uses a system of participatory planning instead of markets to coordinate economic activities, Friedman would have us believe that participatory planning must fall into the category of "central direction involving the use of coercion."

Albert and Hahnel have voiced detailed critiques of centrally-planned economies in theory and practice, but are also highly-critical of capitalism. Hahnel claims "the truth is capitalism aggravates prejudice, is the most inequitable economy ever devised, is grossly inefficient—even if highly energetic—and is incompatible with both economic and political democracy. In the present era of free-market triumphalism it is useful to organize a sober evaluation of capitalism responding to Friedman's claims one by one."

=== Critique of markets ===
Mainstream economists largely acknowledge the problem of externalities but believe they can be addressed either through Coasian bargaining or the use of Pigovian taxes—corrective taxes on goods that produce negative externalities. While Hahnel (and Albert) favour the use of Pigovian taxes as solutions to environmental problems within market economies (over alternatives such as the issuance of marketable permits), he is critical about the regressive incidence of such taxes. Firms in a market economy will seek to shift the costs of taxation onto their consumers. While this might be considered a positive development in terms of incentives—since it penalizes consumers for "dirty" consumption—it fails to achieve the polluter pays principle and would instead aggravate "economic injustice." Hahnel, therefore, recommends that pollution taxes be linked to cuts in regressive taxes such as social security taxes.

Hahnel is also critical of the mainstream assumption that externalities are anomalous and, on the whole, insignificant to market efficiency; he asserts instead that externalities are prevalent—the rule rather than the exception—and substantial.

Ultimately, Hahnel argues that Pigovian taxes, along with associated corrective measures advanced by market economists, fall far short of adequately or fairly addressing externalities. He argues such methods are incapable of attaining accurate assessments of social costs:

Markets corrected by pollution taxes only lead to the efficient amount of pollution and satisfy the polluter pays principle if the taxes are set equal to the magnitude of the damage victims suffer. But because markets are not incentive compatible for polluters and pollution victims, markets provide no reliable way to estimate the magnitudes of efficient taxes for pollutants. Ambiguity over who has the property right, polluters or pollution victims, free rider problems among multiple victims, and the transaction costs of forming and maintaining an effective coalition of pollution victims, each of whom is affected to a small but unequal degree, all combine to render market systems incapable of eliciting accurate information from pollution victims about the damages they suffer, or acting upon that information even if it were known.

=== Class and hierarchy ===
Although parecon falls under left-wing political tradition, it is designed to avoid the creation of powerful intellectual elites or the rule of a bureaucracy, which is perceived as the major problem of the economies of the communist states of the 20th century. In their book Looking Forward Albert and Hanhel termed this situation 'coordinatorism'. Parecon advocates recognize that monopolization of empowering labor, in addition to private ownership, can be a source of class division. Thus, a three-class view of the economy (capitalists, coordinators, and workers) is stressed, in contrast to the traditional two-class view of Marxism. The coordinator class, emphasized in parecon, refers to those who have a monopoly on empowering skills and knowledge, and corresponds to the doctors, lawyers, managers, engineers, and other professionals in present economies. Parecon advocates argue that, historically, Marxism ignored the ability of coordinators to become a new ruling class in a post-capitalist society.

=== Innovation ===
Hahnel has also written a detailed discussion of parecon's desirability compared to capitalism with respect to incentives to innovate. In capitalism, patent laws, intellectual property rights and barriers to market entry are institutional features that reward individual innovators while limiting the use of new technologies. Hahnel notes that, in contrast, "in a participatory economy all innovations will immediately be made available to all enterprises, so there will never be any loss of static efficiency.".

== Criticism ==
The market socialist David Schweickart suggests participatory economics would be undesirable even if it was possible:

It is a system obsessed with comparison (Is your job complex more empowering than mine?), with monitoring (You are not working at average intensity, mate—get with the program), with the details of consumption (How many rolls of toilet paper will I need next year? Why are some of my neighbors still using the kind not made of recycled paper?)

Other criticism raised by Schweickart include:

- Difficulty with creating balanced job complexes and ensuring they do not suffer from inefficiency.
- A system based on peer evaluation may not work as workers could slack off and there would be little incentive for colleagues to damage their relationships by giving them bad reviews. Alternatively it may cause workers to become suspicious of one another, undermining solidarity.
- A compensation system based on effort would be difficult to measure and would need to be based on an average rating system of effort.
- Parecon's compensation system would be overly egalitarian and likely cause resentment among workers who work harder while also discouraging them from putting in extra effort since they will gain no greater compensation.
- Parecon would likely produce an onerous and tiresome requirement to list off all things people want produced, which would likely suffer from uncertainty given people do not always know what they desire, as well as issues with how much information they should be required to supply and complexities with the negotiations required between worker and consumer councils.

Theodore Burczak argues that it would be difficult for others to measure sacrifice in another's labor, which is largely unobservable.

=== Planning ===
Participatory economics would create a large amount of administrative work for individual workers, who would have to plan their consumption in advance, and a new bureaucratic class. Proponents of parecon argue that capitalist economies are hardly free of bureaucracy or meetings, and a parecon would eliminate banks, advertising, stock market, tax returns and long-term financial planning. Albert and Hahnel claim that it is probable that a similar number of workers will be involved in a parecon bureaucracy as in a capitalist bureaucracy, with much of the voting achieved by computer rather than meeting, and those who are not interested in the collective consumption proposals not required to attend.

Critics suggest that proposals require consideration of an unfeasibly large set of policy choices, and that lessons from planned societies show that peoples' daily needs cannot be established well in advance simply by asking people what they want. Albert and Hahnel note that markets themselves hardly adjust prices instantaneously, and suggest that in a participatory economy facilitation boards could modify prices on a regular basis. According to Hahnel these act according to democratically decided guidelines, can be composed of members from other regions and are impossible to bribe due to parecon's non-transferable currency. However, Takis Fotopoulos argues that "no kind of economic organisation based on planning alone, however democratic and decentralized it is, can secure real self-management and freedom of choice."

== See also ==
- Anarchist economics
- Anarcho-syndicalism
- Collaborative e-democracy
- Co-operative
- Economic democracy
- Inclusive Democracy
- Libertarian municipalism
- Participatory politics
- Social justice
