= David Schweickart =

American mathematician and philosopher (born 1942)

David Schweickart (born 1942) is an American mathematician and philosopher.

He holds a BS in Mathematics from the University of Dayton, a PhD in Mathematics from the University of Virginia, and a PhD in Philosophy from Ohio State University. He is a Professor of Philosophy at Loyola University Chicago.

He has taught at Loyola since 1975. He was a visiting professor of mathematics at the University of Kentucky from 1969 to 1970, and a visiting professor of philosophy at the University of New Hampshire from 1986 to 1987. He has also lectured in Spain, Cuba, El Salvador, Italy, the Czech Republic, and throughout the United States. In 1999, Schweickart was named Faculty Member of the Year at Loyola University Chicago.

Schweickart is an editor and contributing writer to SolidarityEconomy.net, an online journal dedicated to economic democracy.

== Economic democracy and market socialism ==
In After Capitalism and other works, Schweickart has developed the model of market socialism he refers to as "economic democracy". In his own words, "Economic Democracy is a market economy." It embodies several key ideas:

- Workplace self-management, including election of supervisors
- Management of capital investment by a form of public banking
- A market for goods, raw materials, instruments of production, etc.
- Protectionism to enforce trade equality between nations

The firms and factories are owned by society and managed by the workers. These enterprises, so managed, compete in markets to sell their goods. Profit is shared by the workers. Each enterprise is taxed for the capital they employ, and that tax is distributed to public banks, who fund expansion of existing and new industry.

== Criticism of parecon ==
In 2006, Schweickart wrote a detailed critique of Michael Albert's participatory economics, called Nonsense on Stilts: Michael Albert's Parecon. He claimed three fundamental features of the economic system are flawed.

== Published works ==
- After Capitalism (Rowman and Littlefield, 2002) - ISBN 0-7425-1300-9
- Market Socialism: The Debate Among Socialists, with Bertell Ollman, Hillel Ticktin and James Lawler (Routledge, 1998)
- Against Capitalism (Cambridge University Press, 1993; Spanish translation, 1997; Chinese translation, 2003)
- Capitalism or Worker Control? An Ethical and Economic Appraisal (Praeger, 1980)

== See also ==
- American philosophy
- List of American philosophers
