= Socialist mode of production =

Marxian economy centered around use value, planning and contribution-based distribution

The socialist mode of production, also known as socialism, is a specific historical phase of base and superstructural development and its corresponding set of social relations that emerge from capitalism in the schema of historical materialism within Marxist theory. Communist states that claimed to have established socialist material relations claimed to have established socialist states.

The Marxist definition of socialism is that of production for use-value (i.e., abolition of commodity production, direct satisfaction of human needs, or economic demands), therefore the law of value no longer directs economic activity. Marxist production for use is coordinated through conscious economic planning. According to Marx, distribution of products is based on the principle of "to each according to his needs"; Soviet models often distributed products based on the principle of "to each according to his contribution". Marx characterized the social relations of communism, the first stage of which is now called socialism, by the abolition of class distinctions and the common ownership of the means of production. As classes are abolished, the state withers away. Later self-titled socialist states revised this definition of socialism and used the term more loosely as a rough equivalent to the dictatorship of the proletariat.

The Marxian conception of socialism stands in contrast to other early conceptions of socialism, most notably early forms of market socialism based on classical economics such as mutualism and Ricardian socialism. Unlike the Marxian conception, these conceptions of socialism retained commodity exchange (markets) for labour and the means of production seeking to perfect the market process. The Marxist idea of socialism was also heavily opposed to utopian socialism. Although Marx and Engels wrote very little on socialism and neglected to provide any details on how it might be organized, numerous social scientists and neoclassical economists have used Marx's theory as a basis for developing their own models of socialist economic systems. The Marxist view of socialism served as a point of reference during the socialist calculation debate.

Marx himself did not use the term socialism to refer to this development. Instead, Marx called it a communist society that has not yet reached its higher-stage. The term socialism was popularized during the Russian Revolution by Vladimir Lenin. This view is consistent with and helped to inform early concepts of socialism in which the law of value no longer directs economic activity. Monetary relations in the form of exchange-value, profit, interest and wage labour would not operate and apply to Marxist socialism.

== Mode of production ==
Karl Marx described a socialist society as such:

What we have to deal with here is a communist society, not as it has developed on its own foundations, but, on the contrary, just as it emerges from capitalist society; which is thus in every respect, economically, morally, and intellectually, still stamped with the birthmarks of the old society from whose womb it emerges. Accordingly, the individual producer receives back from society – after the deductions have been made – exactly what he gives to it. What he has given to it is his individual quantum of labor. For example, the social working day consists of the sum of the individual hours of work; the individual labor time of the individual producer is the part of the social working day contributed by him, his share in it. He receives a certificate from society that he has furnished such-and-such an amount of labor (after deducting his labor for the common funds); and with this certificate, he draws from the social stock of means of consumption as much as the same amount of labor cost. The same amount of labor which he has given to society in one form, he receives back in another.

In Marxist theory, Socialism, referred to by Marx as the first stage of communism, is a classless, post-commodity economic system in which production is carried out to directly produce use-value rather than to generate profit. According to Marx and Engels, it is what follows after the transitionary period of the Dictatorship of the Proletariat. Private ownership and accumulation of capital have been abolished along with class distinctions as a whole and production is carried out in a planned fashion according to the needs of society. In his Critique of the Gotha Programme, Marx suggested that in the first stage of communism people would receive labor vouchers according to the hours they work, but with subtractions, a sort of taxation, made for social services. With these vouchers one would be able to "buy" the goods produced by society (i.e. produced using the commonly owned means of production) valued according to the labor hours needed for their production, so that one only takes as much as one has contributed. There is no extraction of surplus value and thus no exploitation in such a system. The higher stage of communism differs from the lower stage of communism in some aspects. To quote Marx:

In a higher phase of communist society, after the enslaving subordination of the individual to the division of labor, and therewith also the antithesis between mental and physical labor, has vanished; after labor has become not only a means of life but life's prime want; after the productive forces have also increased with the all-around development of the individual, and all the springs of co-operative wealth flow more abundantly – only then can the narrow horizon of bourgeois right be crossed in its entirety and society inscribe on its banners: From each according to his ability, to each according to his needs!

The prerequisite of the higher phase of communism is a long period of growth within the first phase, during which all imprints left from the old capitalist society gradually disappear. Tremendous development of technology and productive capacity allow for fully automated production, resulting in a superabundance of goods and services. This post-scarcity economy, along with the cultural development resulting in the widespread disappearance of individualism and exploitation, allow for goods to be distributed based on need rather than merit.

== Social relations ==
The fundamental goal of socialism from the view of Karl Marx and Friedrich Engels was the realization of human freedom and individual autonomy. Specifically, this refers to freedom from the alienation imposed upon individuals in the form of coercive social relations as well as material scarcity, whereby the individual is compelled to engage in activities merely to survive to reproduce his or herself. The aim of socialism is to provide an environment whereby individuals are free to express their genuine interests, creative freedom and desires unhindered by forms of social control that force individuals to work for a class of owners who expropriate and live off the surplus product.

As a set of social relations, socialism is defined by the degree to which economic activity in society is planned by the associated producers so that the surplus product produced by socialized assets is controlled by a majority of the population through marxist-democratic processes. Complete socialism, the first phase of communism, means the abolition of class distinctions and the control over production by society as a whole. The sale of labour power would be abolished so that every individual participates in running their institution as stakeholders or members with no one having coercive power over anyone else in a vertical social division of labour which is to be distinguished from a non-social, technical division of labour which would still exist in socialism. The incentive structure changes in a socialist society given the change in the social environment so that an individual labourers' work becomes increasingly autonomous and creative, creating a sense of responsibility for his or her institution as a stakeholder.

=== Role of the state ===
In Marxist theory, the state is "the institution of organised violence which is used by the ruling class of a country to maintain the conditions of its rule. Thus, it is only in a society which is divided between hostile social classes that the state exists". The state is seen as a mechanism dominated by the interests of the ruling class. It subjugates other classes, to protect and legitimize the existing economic system.

After a proletarian revolution, the state would initially become the instrument of the proletariat. Conquest of the state by the proletariat is a prerequisite to establishing a socialist system. As socialism is built, the role and scope of the state changes. Class distinctions, based on ownership of the means of production, gradually deteriorate. The concentration of means of production increasingly falls into state hands. Once all means of production become state property, class distinctions are no more and socialism, the first stage of communism is achieved, the primary function of the state changes. Political rule via coercion over men diminishes through the creation and enforcement of laws, scientific administration and the direction of the processes of production. As a result, the state becomes an entity of economic coordination rather than a mechanism of class or political control and is no longer a state in the Marxian sense.

== See also ==
- Capitalist mode of production
- Communism
- Critique of political economy
- Economic planning
- Green socialism
- Law of value
- Marxism
- Marxian economics
- Mode of production
- Post-capitalism
- Primary stage of socialism
- Production for use
- Relations of production
- Scientific socialism
- Socialist calculation debate
- Socialist economics
- Socialisation
- Yellow socialism
