= Robin Hahnel =

American economist (born 1946)

- Born: March 25, 1946 (age 80)

Academic background
- Education: Harvard University
- Influences: Karl Marx, Cornelius Castoriadis, Karl Polanyi, Paul Sweezy, Oskar R. Lange, Michał Kalecki, Piero Sraffa, Amartya Sen, Joan Robinson, John Maynard Keynes

Academic work
- Discipline: Political economy
- School or tradition: Libertarian socialism
- Notable ideas: Co-proposer of participatory economics, a libertarian socialist economy based on equitable cooperation, and a strategy for abolishing capitalist market economy

Robin Eric Hahnel (born March 25, 1946) is an American economist and professor emeritus of economics at American University. His academic work applies libertarian socialist values to piecemeal economic proposals, critiquing both capitalist market economies and authoritarian centrally planned economies.

== Bibliography ==
- Unorthodox Marxism with M. Albert (1978)
- Socialism Today and Tomorrow with M. Albert (1981)
- Marxism and Socialist Theory with M. Albert (1981)
- Liberating Theory with M. Albert, Holly Sklar, Lydia Sargent, Noam Chomsky, Mel King, and Leslie Kagan (1986)
- A Quiet Revolution in Welfare Economics with M. Albert (1990)
- Looking Forward – Participatory Economics for the Twenty First Century with M. Albert (1991)
- The Political Economy of Participatory Economics with M. Albert (1991)
- Panic Rules (1999)
- ABC's of Political Economy (2003)
- Economic Justice and Democracy: From Competition to Cooperation (2005)
- Green Economics (2011)
- Of the people, By the people – The Case for a Participatory Economy (2012)
- Radical Political Economy: Sraffa versus Marx (2017)
- Democratic Economic Planning (2021)

== See also ==
- Direct democracy
- Inclusive Democracy
- Industrial Workers of the World
- Market abolitionism
- Socialist economies
- Workplace democracy
