= An Introduction to the Three Volumes of Karl Marx's Capital =

2004 book by Michael Heinrich

- Cover art for the 2012 English edition
- Author: Michael Heinrich
- Original title: Kritik der politischen Ökonomie: Eine Einführung
- Translator: Alexander Locascio
- Subject: Social sciences, economic theory, demography, capital, capitalism
- Published: 2004 (Schmetterling Verlag)
- Publication place: Germany
- English publication date: 2012 (Monthly Review Press)
- Pages: 220 (Original); 240 (English)
- ISBN: 978-1-58367-289-1
- Dewey Decimal: 335.4/1
- LC Class: HB501.M37 H4513 2012
- Text: An Introduction to the Three Volumes of Karl Marx's Capital at Internet Archive

An Introduction to the Three Volumes of Karl Marx's Capital (German: Kritik der politischen Ökonomie: Eine Einführung) is a book by German Marxist scholar Michael Heinrich examining the three volumes of Karl Marx's major economic work Capital. Published in German in 2004, the book is structured as a shortened account of Marx's analysis of capitalism, and is written from the standpoint of the Neue Marx-Lektüre school of thought, criticising both Marxist and bourgeois readings of Marx. The book was first published in Germany by Schmetterling Verlag and became one of the most popular introductions to Capital in the country. It was the first of Heinrich's works to be translated into English, with a 2012 edition by Monthly Review Press.

== Background ==
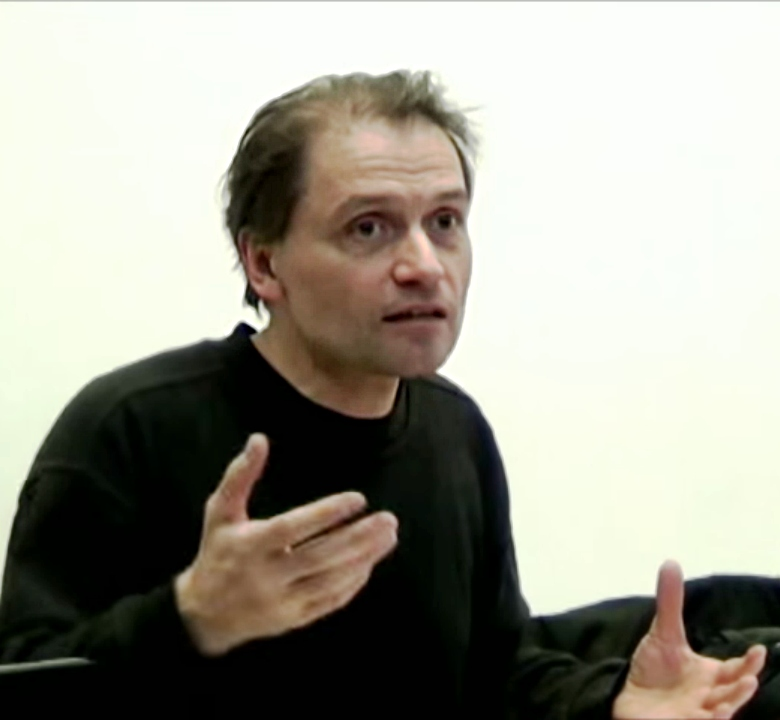
Heinrich in 2014

Michael Heinrich published An Introduction to the Three Volumes of Karl Marx's Capital in 2004 while working as a lecturer in economics at HTW Berlin. He was the managing editor of PROKLA: Journal for Critical Social Science until 2014 and was a contributor to the Marx-Engels-Gesamtausgabe (MEGA; lit. 'Marx-Engels Complete Writings'). In a 2011 interview, Heinrich stated that the aim of the book was to present Marx's Capital and other basic elements of Marx's theory to new readers.

The foundations for the book were laid in his 1991 (Note: Expanded and republished in 1999) PhD thesis The Science of Value (German: Die Wissenschaft vom Wert) which, along with the Introduction, was published as part of a wider discourse in Germany on the monetary character of Marx's theory of value. This revival of research into Marx, known as the Neue Marx-Lektüre ('New Reading of Marx'), was based on the earlier work of Western Marxists like Theodor Adorno and Louis Althusser and was initiated by West German scholars Hans-Georg Backhaus and Helmut Reichelt during the 1960s and 1970s. The Neue Marx-Lektüre involved a re-examination of Marx's auxiliary texts and the theoretical distinctions between the different editions of Capital that were published in the second edition of MEGA in 1975.

As part of the Neue Marx-Lektüre, the book rejects "worldview Marxism" (German: Weltanschauungsmarxismus), which Heinrich characterises as a reading of Marx marked by its oversimplification of social phenomena as the result of purely economic interests, its historical determinism, and view of Marx's theories as "all-encompassing". In the book, Heinrich attributes the development of "worldview Marxism" to the contributions of Friedrich Engels and Karl Kautsky following Marx's death that were later incorporated into Marxism–Leninism. The book contests that Marx had adopted the ideas of classical economics and its labour theory of value in an attempt to build an alternative political economy and instead argues that Marx's project was based on a critique of the presuppositions of all established economic science.

Following the 1993 publication of the original economic manuscripts for Volumes II and III of Capital in MEGA, Heinrich argued that Engels had distorted Marx's manuscripts as part of his attempt to publish a coherent third volume. This stance was met with harsh criticism and generated a number of defences of Engels's editorial work. In the book, Heinrich argues that Capital was a fragmented and unfinished work that therefore included concepts that needed to be redesigned to be used for concrete economic analysis.

== Summary ==
Heinrich's Introduction is organised around various themes in Marx's work, and draws on his unfinished manuscripts the Grundrisse and Theories of Surplus Value in addition to its reading of Capital. Chapters 1 and 2 of the book introduce and place the book within the wider Marxist corpus. Chapters 3–5 discuss Capital Volume I, chapter 6 discusses Volume II, and chapters 7–10 discuss Volume III; chapters 11 and 12 discuss theories of the state and communism, respectively. The book also incorporates an analysis of the differences between the various revisions made by Marx to Capital, as well as a wide range of historical documents.

Like other Neue Marx-Lektüre adherents, Heinrich favours a monetary reading of Marx's theory of value, arguing against conventional conceptions of Marx's theory of value, where the value of a commodity is derived from its socially necessary labour time. Against readings of Marx's theory of value as a labour theory of value, Heinrich argues that Marx's value theory conceptualises value as a historical social relation where an individual commodity has tangible value only through the act of exchange. By calling value and price two different levels of abstraction, Heinrich's reading of Marx sidesteps the transformation problem, a commonly raised criticism of Marx's Capital on the difficulty of establishing a consistent relationship between value and price.

The book devotes special attention to the concepts of fetishism and reification to correct common misconceptions that confuse the concepts with false consciousness, alienation, or simple consumerism. Heinrich argues that Marx's theory of fetishism constitutes a theory of social domination that applies not just to commodities, but to capital and to "social relations in bourgeois society" as well.

Heinrich also rejects the significance of the tendency of the rate of profit to fall in Marx's theory of crisis. He argues against popular interpretations that suggest a law between a rise in the organic composition of capital and a fall in the rate of profit, which fail to consider the contradictory effects that capitalist development can have on the rate of profit.

== Reception ==
The Introduction has been praised for its systematic examination of Marx and for its comprehensive inclusion of Volumes II and III of Marx's Capital, in contrast to many other books on Marx's critique of political economy which primarily write about Volume I. Heinrich insists in the book that a reading of Capital must include Volumes II and III to not be subject to distortion. Academic Johan Fornäs praised the book for its attention to detail on the various differences between the different editions of Marx's Capital.

Author Doug Henwood praised the book as one of the best short introductions to Marx's Capital. Writing in Historical Materialism, historian Guido Starosta praised Heinrich's commentary on commodity fetishism for its rigour, contrasting it from David Harvey's A Companion to Marx's Capital, which he criticised for trivialising commodity fetishism. Similarly, Chris O'Kane, writing in the Marx & Philosophy Review of Books, and Petrino DiLeo, writing in the International Socialist Review, both praised Heinrich's treatment of fetishism for its lucidity.

The Marxian economist Paul Cockshott praised the Introduction for its clarity while criticising Heinrich's interpretation of Marx, arguing that Heinrich's break from conventional interpretations of Marx would detach the scientific method from the labour theory of value. Sociologist John Holloway likewise praised the book as "impressively clear", but said he did not share its interpretation of Marx. Social scientist Christian Fuchs criticised the book for suggesting that Heinrich's reading of Marx is universally accepted and the one correct reading of Marx. Fuchs also took issue with Heinrich's understanding of value as the product of exchange, arguing that Heinrich's approach would suggest that "no exploitation has taken place if a commodity is not sold".

In Germany, the book has been reprinted many times and is widely used in universities and Capital reading groups. Writing for The Nation, Alyssa Battistoni noted that the book had arguably replaced Harvey's A Companion to Marx's Capital as "the essential reading guide" to Capital.

== See also ==
- Critique of political economy
- Law of value
- Reading Capital
- Valorisation
