= Value (economics) =

Benefit provided by a good or service in an economy

In economics, economic value or simply value is a measure of the benefit provided by a good or service to an economic agent. Value for money represents an assessment of whether financial or other resources are being used effectively in order to secure such benefit. Economic value is generally measured through units of currency, and the interpretation is therefore "what is the maximum amount of money a person is willing and able to pay for a good or service?” Value for money is often expressed in comparative terms, such as "better", or "best value for money", but may also be expressed in absolute terms, such as where a deal does, or does not, offer value for money. Among the competing schools of economic theory there are differing theories of value.

== Overview ==
The economic value of a good or service has puzzled economists since the beginning of the discipline. First, economists tried to estimate the value of a good to an individual alone, and extend that definition to goods that can be exchanged. From this analysis came the concepts value in use and value in exchange.

Value is linked to price through the mechanism of exchange. When an economist observes an exchange, two important value functions are revealed: those of the buyer and seller. Just as the buyer reveals what he is willing to pay for a certain amount of a good, so too does the seller reveal what it costs him to give up the good.

Additional information about market value is obtained by the rate at which transactions occur, telling observers the extent to which the purchase of the good has value over time.

Said another way, value is how much a desired object or condition is worth relative to other objects or conditions. Economic values are expressed as "how much" of one desirable condition or product will, or would be given up in exchange for some other desired condition or product. Among the competing schools of economic theory there are differing metrics for value assessment and the metrics are the subject of a theory of value. Value theories are a large part of the differences and disagreements between the various schools of economic theory.

Value for money forms part of the "economic dimension" of the five "cases" required to validate a UK government investment or spending proposal. UK government guidance in this context speaks of "assessing" and of "maximising" value for money.

== History ==
In neoclassical economics, the value of an object or service is often seen as nothing but the price it would bring in an open and competitive market. This is determined primarily by the demand for the object relative to supply in a perfectly competitive market. Many neoclassical economic theories equate the value of a commodity with its price, whether the market is competitive or not. As such, everything is seen as a commodity and if there is no market to set a price then there is no economic value.

In classical economics, the value of an object or condition is the amount of discomfort/labor saved through the consumption or use of an object or condition (Use value). Though exchange value is recognized, economic value is not, in theory, dependent on the existence of a market and price and value are not seen as equal. This is complicated, however, by the efforts of classical economists to connect price and labor value. Karl Marx, for one, saw exchange value as the "form of appearance" (This interpretation of Marx is along the lines of the Marxist thinker Michael Heinrich) [Erscheinungsform] of value, in his critique of political economy which implies that, although value is separate from exchange value, it is meaningless without the act of exchange.

In this tradition, Steve Keen makes the claim that "value" refers to "the innate worth of a commodity, which determines the normal ('equilibrium') ratio at which two commodities exchange." To Keen and the tradition of David Ricardo, this corresponds to the classical concept of long-run cost-determined prices, what Adam Smith called "natural prices" and Marx called "prices of production". It is part of a cost-of-production theory of value and price. Ricardo, but not Keen, used a "labor theory of price" in which a commodity's "innate worth" was the amount of labor needed to produce it.

"The value of a thing in any given time and place", according to Henry George, "is the largest amount of exertion that anyone will render in exchange for it. But as men always seek to gratify their desires with the least exertion this is the lowest amount for which a similar thing can otherwise be obtained."

In another classical tradition, Marx distinguished between the "value in use" (use-value, what a commodity provides to its buyer), labor cost which he calls "value" (the socially-necessary labour time it embodies), and "exchange value" (how much labor-time the sale of the commodity can claim, Smith's "labor commanded" value). By most interpretations of his labor theory of value, Marx, like Ricardo, developed a "labor theory of price" where the point of analyzing value was to allow the calculation of relative prices. Others see values as part of his sociopolitical interpretation and critique of capitalism and other societies, and deny that it was intended to serve as a category of economics. According to a third interpretation, Marx aimed for a theory of the dynamics of price formation but did not complete it.

In 1860, John Ruskin published a critique of the economic concept of value from a moral point of view. He entitled the volume Unto This Last, and his central point was this: "It is impossible to conclude, of any given mass of acquired wealth, merely by the fact of its existence, whether it signifies good or evil to the nation in the midst of which it exists. Its real value depends on the moral sign attached to it, just as strictly as that of a mathematical quantity depends on the algebraic sign attached to it. Any given accumulation of commercial wealth may be indicative, on the one hand, of faithful industries, progressive energies, and productive ingenuities: or, on the other, it may be indicative of mortal luxury, merciless tyranny, ruinous chicanery." Gandhi was greatly inspired by Ruskin's book and published a paraphrase of it in 1908.

Economists such as Ludwig von Mises asserted that "value" is a subjective judgment. Prices can only be determined by taking these subjective judgments into account, and that this is done through the price mechanism in the market. Thus, it was false to say that the economic value of a good was equal to what it cost to produce or to its current replacement cost.

== Connected concepts ==
The theory of value is closely related to that of allocative efficiency, the quality by which firms produce those goods and services most valued by society. The market value of a machine part, for example, will depend upon a variety of objective facts involving its efficiency versus the efficiency of other types of part or other types of machine to make the kind of products that consumers will value in turn. In such a case, market value has both objective and subjective components.

Economy, efficiency and effectiveness, often referred to as the "Three Es", may be used as complementary factors contributing to an assessment of the value for money provided by a purchase, project or activity. The UK National Audit Office uses the following summaries to explain the meaning of each term:

- Economy: minimising the cost of resources used or required (inputs) – spending less;
- Efficiency: the relationship between the output from goods or services and the resources to produce them – spending well; and
- Effectiveness: the relationship between the intended and actual results of public spending (outcomes) – spending wisely.

Sometimes a fourth 'E', equity, is also added.

In philosophy, economic value is a subcategory of a more general philosophical value, as defined in goodness and value theory or in the science of value.

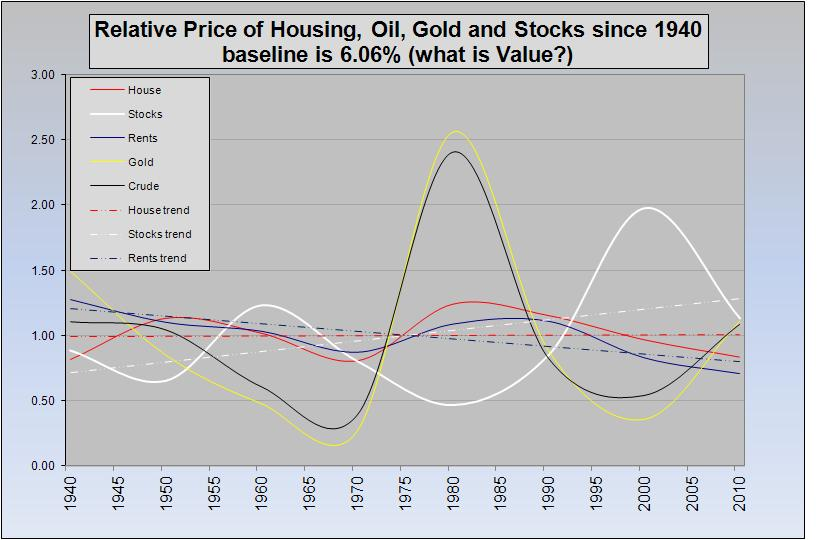
Value or price

Economic value is not the same as market price, nor is economic value the same thing as market value. If a consumer is willing to buy a good, it implies that the customer places a higher value on the good than the market price. The difference between the value to the consumer and the market price is called "consumer surplus". It is easy to see situations where the actual value is considerably larger than the market price: purchase of drinking water is one example.

== Theories ==
Adam Smith agreed with certain aspects of labor theory of value, but believed it did not fully explain price and profit. Instead, he proposed a cost-of-production theory of value (to later develop into exchange value theory) that explained value was determined by several different factors, including wages and rents. This theory of value, according to Smith, best explained the natural prices in the market. While an underdeveloped theory at the time, it did offer an alternative to another popular value theory of the time.

The utility theory of value was the belief that price and value were solely based on how much "use" an individual received from a commodity. However, this theory is rejected in Smith's work The Wealth of Nations. The famous diamond–water paradox questions this by examining the use in comparison to price of these goods. Water, while necessary for life, is far less expensive than diamonds, which have basically no use. Which value theory holds true divides economic thinkers, and is the base for many socioeconomic and political beliefs.

Silvio Gesell denied value theory in economics. He thought that value theory is useless and prevents economics from becoming science and that a currency administration guided by value theory is doomed to sterility and inactivity.

=== Labor theory of value ===
In classical economics, the labor theory of value asserts that the economic value of a commodity is determined by the total amount of socially necessary labor required to produce it. When speaking in terms of a labor theory of value, value without any qualifying adjective theoretically refers to the amount of labor necessary for the production of a marketable commodity, including the labor necessary for the development of any capital used in the production process. Both David Ricardo and Karl Marx attempted to quantify and embody all labor components in order to develop a theory of the real, or natural, price of a commodity.

In either case, what is being addressed are general prices—i.e., prices in the aggregate, not a specific price of a particular good or service in a given circumstance. Theories in either class allow for deviations when a particular price is struck in a real-world market transaction, or when a price is set in some price fixing regime.

=== Monetary theory of value ===
Critics of traditional Marxian economics, especially those associated with the Neue Marx-Lektüre (New Readings of Marx) such as Michael Heinrich, emphasize a monetary theory of value, where "Money is the necessary form of appearance of value (and of capital) in the sense that prices constitute the only form of appearance of the value of commodities." Similarly to the exchange theory, this theory emphasizes value as being socially determined, rather than having a physical substance.

According to this analysis, when money incorporates production into its M-C-M' circulation, it functions as capital implementing the capitalist relation and the exploitation of labor power constitutes the actual presupposition for this incorporation.

=== Subjective theory of value and marginalism ===
The subjective theory of value emphasizes the role of consumer preferences in influencing price. According to this theory, the consumer places a value on a commodity by determining the marginal utility, or additional satisfaction of one additional unit. Marginalism employs concepts such as marginal utility, marginal rate of substitution, and opportunity costs to explain consumer preferences and price.

== See also ==
- Asset pricing
- Labor theory of value
- Law of value
- Marginalism
- Market price
- Net worth
- Non-extractive economic value
- Objective theory of value
- Paradox of value
- Real versus nominal value (economics)
- Store of value
- Subjective theory of value
- Use value
- Utility
- Valuation (finance)
- Value (marketing)
- Value-form
- Value network
