= Michael Heinrich =

German political scientist (born 1957)

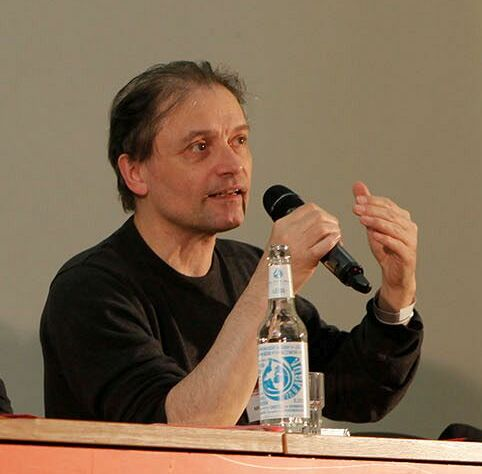
- Heinrich in 2018
- Born: 1957 (age 68–69); Heidelberg, West Germany

Education
- Education: Free University of Berlin

Philosophical work
- Era: Contemporary philosophy
- Region: Western philosophy
- School: Marxism; Neue Marx-Lektüre
- Institutions: Free University of Berlin; University of Vienna; HTW Berlin
- Main interests: Value-form theory; Critique of political economy; History of philosophy
- Notable ideas: Marx's theory of value as a monetary theory of value; Criticism of "worldview Marxism"; Criticism of the proletariat as an automatically revolutionary subject

Michael Heinrich (born 1957) is a German historian of philosophy and political scientist, specialising in the critical study of the development of Karl Marx's thought. Heinrich's work, influenced by Elmar Altvater and the Neue Marx-Lektüre of Hans-Georg Backhaus and Helmut Reichelt is characterised by its focus on the points of ambivalence and inconsistency in the work of Marx. Through this theme, Heinrich challenges both the closed system he identifies with "worldview Marxism", as well as teleological narratives of Marx's intellectual development throughout his life.

He is best known for his 1991 study of the theoretical field of classical political economy The Science of Value (German: Die Wissenschaft vom Wert), his introductory text to the critique of political economy, An Introduction to the Three Volumes of Karl Marx's Capital, and his ongoing project to produce a multi-volume biography of Marx, the first volume of which was published in German in 2018 and English in 2019.

== Career ==
Heinrich was a research assistant at the Department of Political Science at Free University of Berlin from 1987 to 1993, where he received his PhD. His dissertation was published as The Science of Value (German: Die Wissenschaft vom Wert) in 1991, and is now in its eighth edition in Germany. An English translation is forthcoming on the Historical Materialism imprint of Brill Publishers. Following his habilitation, Heinrich was a visiting professor at the University of Vienna and HTW Berlin. Heinrich was later appointed as lecturer at Free University Berlin, and returned to HTW Berlin as lecturer from 2005 to 2016. In this period, Heinrich was involved in preparatory work on the Marx-Engels-Gesamtausgabe, and until 2014 served as managing editor of PROKLA: Journal for Critical Social Science.

Heinrich is presently working on a four-volume biography of Marx's life. The first volume, Karl Marx and the Birth of Modern Society, was published in 2018, and appeared in English the next year on Monthly Review Press, with Portuguese, French and Spanish translations following suit.

== Thought ==
Heinrich is an outspoken critic of what he calls "worldview Marxism" (Weltanschauungsmarxismus), for which Karl Kautsky was the dominant figure. This form of Marxism is characterized by "a crudely knitted materialism, a bourgeois belief in progress, and a few strongly simplified elements of Hegelian philosophy and modular pieces of Marxian terminology combined into simple formulas and explanations". Other prominent features include "a rather crude economism" and "a pronounced historical determinism that viewed the end of capitalism and the proletarian revolution as inevitable occurrences".

=== Commodity fetishism and the context of deception ===
Contrary to "worldview Marxism", Heinrich primarily views Marx as "a critic of a social structure that is mediated by value and thus 'fetishized'". Following the structuralism of Althusser and critical theory, he speaks of a context of deception (Verblendungszusammenhang) to which both workers and capitalists are equally subject. For Heinrich, fetishism is not an impenetrable context of deception, but one cannot speak of a "privileged position of perception occupied by the working class", nor can one speak of a conscious instrumentalization by capital, making moral criticisms of behaviors of individuals unproductive.

=== Monetary theory of value ===
Heinrich rejects the "substantialist" interpretation of Marx's theory of value, which understands value as the "property of an individual commodity", namely the "abstract labor" defined by Marx. Rather, he understands Marx's theory as a monetary theory of value, which marks a paradigmatic shift from the pre-monetary labor theory of the preceding classical political economists, and also distinguishes Marx from the utility theory of neoclassical economics.

Although the value of a commodity appears to be a material property, it is a social relationship, namely the relationship between "the individual labor of producers and the total labor of society". This does not mean that exchange produces value, but that only in exchange can value "obtain an objective value form".

=== Tendency of the rate of profit to fall and crisis theory ===
Heinrich argues against giving a central place to the tendency of the rate of profit to fall, stating that Marx did not include the argument in his published theoretical work. In order to safely deduce a fall in profit as a general tendency, Marx's argument requires the presumption that the rate of surplus-value grows faster than the ratio of capital to value, which cannot be demonstrated from the concepts with which Marx is working. While the general direction of movement of both quantities may be known—both the rate of relative surplus-value, and the ratio of capital to value, are taken in ordinary capitalist conditions to increase—neither can grow without limit, and easy conclusions about their comparative rates of growth are not forthcoming. Over a decade after he wrote the manuscript that became, in Engels' edition, the third volume of Capital, Marx composed a mathematical manuscript where he deals at length with the case of rising profit-rates under an increasing value-composition of capital.

Along these lines, Heinrich challenges the identification of Marx's theories of crisis with the law of the tendency of the rate of profit to fall, a reading he attributes principally to Engels having edited the third volume of Capital so as to condense all the fragmentary discussion of crisis under the chapter title "Development of the Law's Internal Contradictions", suggesting all crisis for Marx flows from declining profit rates. Instead, Heinrich suggests we ought to follow the direction of Marx's remarks on the role of crisis in mediating breakdowns of relationships between production and consumption, and extend these arguments through more careful attention to a theory of money and credit. Further, Heinrich is sceptical of the suggestion that crisis for Marx necessarily begets collapse, arguing that the collapse theory "has historically always had an excusatory function: regardless of how bad contemporary defeats were, the opponent's end was a certainty". Heinrich argues that such a theory is not found in Marx beyond a possible trace of one in the Grundrisse, one which is not taken up in Marx's later work.

== Published books (selected) ==
- Die Wissenschaft vom Wert. Die Marxsche Kritik der politischen Ökonomie zwischen wissenschaftlicher Revolution und klassischer Tradition. VSA-Verlag, Hamburg 1991, ISBN 3-87975-583-3 (9th edition reprint of 7th expanded edition, Westfälisches Dampfboot, Munich 2022, ISBN 978-3-89691-454-5).
- Kritik der politischen Ökonomie. Eine Einführung in „Das Kapital“ von Karl Marx. 15th edition. Schmetterling, Stuttgart 2021, ISBN 978-3-89657-041-3 (first published 2004).
  - English edition: An Introduction to the Three Volumes of Karl Marx's Capital, Monthly Review Press, New York 2012, ISBN 978-1-58367-289-1.
- Karl Marx and the Birth of Modern Society: The Life of Marx and the Development of His Work. Volume I: 1818-1841, Monthly Review Press, New York 2019, ISBN 978-1-58367-735-3.
- How to Read Marx's ‘Capital’. Commentary and Explanations on the Beginning Chapters. Monthly Review Press, New York 2021, ISBN 978-1-58367-894-7

Online

- Heinrich, Michael (1991). Die Wissenschaft vom Wert: die Marxsche Kritik der politischen Ökonomie zwischen wissenschaftlicher Revolution und klassischer Tradition (in German). VSA-Verlag. ISBN 978-3-87975-583-7.
- Heinrich, Michael (2021). Kritik der politischen Ökonomie: Eine Einleitung in "Das Kapital" von Karl Marx (in German). Schmetterling Verlag GmbH. ISBN 978-3-89657-041-3.
- Heinrich, Michael (2008). Wie das Marxsche "Kapital" lesen?: Leseanleitung und Kommentar zum Anfang des "Kapital" (in German). Schmetterling-Verlag. ISBN 978-3-89657-051-2.
- Heinrich, Michael (2012). Wie das Marxsche Kapital lesen? Bd. 2: Leseanleitung und Kommentar zum Anfang der "Kapital" (in German). Schmetterling Verlag. ISBN 978-3-89657-053-6.
- Heinrich, Michael; Bouffard, Alix; Feron, Alexandre; Fondu, Guillaume (2017). Ce qu'est "Le Capital" de Marx (in French). les Éditions sociales. ISBN 978-2-35367-034-5.
- Heinrich, Michael (2018). Karl Marx und die Geburt der modernen Gesellschaft: Biographie und Werkentwicklung (in German). Schmetterling Stuttgart. ISBN 978-3-89657-085-7.
- Heinrich, Michael (2018). Karl Marx und die Geburt der modernen Gesellschaft: 1818-1841 (in German). Schmetterling Verlag. ISBN 978-3-89657-085-7.
