= Abstract and concrete labour =

Distinction made by Karl Marx

The twofold nature of the production for exchange purposes.

Abstract labour and concrete labour refer to a distinction made by Karl Marx in his critique of political economy. It refers to the difference between human labour in general as economically valuable worktime versus human labour as a particular activity that has a specific useful effect. As discussed in this article, according to Marx abstract labour is a concept that was known and used already in ancient society, but it evolved across time, and is fully developed only in the market relations of industrial capitalism.

== Overview ==
- As economically valuable worktime, human labour adds value to products or assets (thereby conserving their capital value, and/or transferring value from inputs to outputs). In this sense, labour is an activity which creates/maintains economic value pure and simple. This could be realized as a sum of money once labour's product is sold or acquired by a buyer. If an employer hires a worker for a contractually specified time to produce something but the worker does not actually do any work, it's not only a waste of time, but also an extra cost to the employer (a loss of value). The value-creating ability of labour is most clearly visible, when all labour is stopped, for example during a strike or a disaster. If all labour is withdrawn, the value of the capital assets worked with will normally deteriorate. In the end, if all labour is permanently withdrawn, nothing remains but a ghost town.
- As a useful activity of a particular kind, human labour can have a useful effect by producing/supplying particular tangible products which are used by others, or by the producers themselves. In this sense, labour is an activity which creates use-values, i.e. "tangible products, results or effects", which can be used or consumed. The use-value of products is usually taken for granted. Its importance becomes very clear only when goods and services are created, which are (1) of poor quality, (2) not supplied on time and (3) mainly useless to the consumer. Labour must be applied to produce usable and useful products, regardless of how much they are sold for, otherwise they cannot be used and there is no use-value or utility at all. If labour produces useless products or results, it creates no value and it is simply a waste of labour-time. Most likely, useless products cannot be sold other than perhaps to a recycling business.

So, Marx argues that human work is both (1) an activity which, by its useful effect, helps to create particular kinds of products, and (2) in an economic sense, a value-forming activity that, if it is productively applied, can help create more value than there was before. If an employer hires labour, the employer thinks both about how useful the labour service will be for his business operations, and about the value that the labour can create for his business. That is, the right kind of work not only needs to get done, but it also needs to get done in a way that it helps the employer to make money.

If the labour makes no net addition to new value produced, then the employer makes no money from it. The labour will be only an expense to him. If the labour is only a net expense (overhead), then it is commercially speaking unproductive labour. Yet, it may be very necessary to employ this unproductive labour. If that labour was not done, then considerable capital value might be lost from the employer's financial investments. Indeed, the business might fail without it. That is, labour may be very necessary to maintain capital value, although it does not actually add value to capital, and does not directly add to net profit. So, the employer also buys the "unproductive labour", because it reduces his costs. His labour costs will be lower than the loss of value that would occur, if he did not employ unproductive labour to maintain capital value, and to prevent loss of capital value. For example, cleaning work might seem a very menial and low-value activity. But if business equipment fails, customers stay away, and the staff get sick or injured, it costs the business a lot of extra money.

== Origin ==
In the introduction to his Grundrisse manuscript, Marx argued that the category of abstract labour "expresses an ancient relation existing in all social formations"; but, he continued, only in modern bourgeois society (exemplified by the United States) is abstract labour fully realized in practice. Because only there does a system of price-equations exist within a universal market, which can practically reduce the value of all forms and quantities of labour uniformly to sums of money, so that any kind of labour becomes an interchangeable, tradeable good or "input" with a known price tag – and is also practically treated as such. In the Grundrisse, Marx also distinguished between "particular labour" and "general labour", contrasting communal production with production for exchange.

Marx published about the categories of abstract and concrete labour for the first time in A Contribution to the Critique of Political Economy (1859) and they are discussed in more detail in chapter 1 of Capital, Volume I, where Marx writes:

"On the one hand all labour is, speaking physiologically, an expenditure of human labour power, and in its character of identical abstract human labour, it creates and forms the value of commodities. On the other hand, all labour is the expenditure of human labour power in a special form and with a definite aim, and in this, its character of concrete useful labour, it produces use values. ... At first sight a commodity presented itself to us as a complex of two things – use value and exchange value. Later on, we saw also that labour, too, possesses the same twofold nature; for, so far as it finds expression in value, it does not possess the same characteristics that belong to it as a creator of use values. I was the first to point out and to examine critically this twofold nature of the labour contained in commodities. ... this point is the pivot on which a clear comprehension of political economy turns"

== Abstract labour and exchange ==
Marx himself considered that all economising reduced to the economical use of human labour-time; "to economise" ultimately meant saving on human energy and effort.

"The less time the society requires to produce wheat, cattle etc., the more time it wins for other production, material or mental. Just as in the case of an individual, the multiplicity of its development, its enjoyment and its activity depends on economization of time. Economy of time, to this all economy ultimately reduces itself. Society likewise has to distribute its time in a purposeful way, in order to achieve a production adequate to its overall needs; just as the individual has to distribute his time correctly in order to achieve knowledge in proper proportions or in order to satisfy the various demands on his activity."

However, according to Marx, the achievement of abstract thinking about human labour, and the ability to quantify it, is closely related to the historical development of economic exchange in general, and more specifically commodity trade (the trade in wares and merchandise).

The expansion of trade requires the ability to measure and compare all kinds of things - not just length, volume and weight, but also time itself. Originally, the units of measurement used were taken from everyday life—the length of a finger or limb, the volume of an ordinary container, the weight one can carry, the duration of a day or a season, the number of cattle. Socially standardized measurement units began to be used probably from circa 3000 BC onwards in ancient Egypt and Mesopotamia, and then state authorities began to supervise the use of measures, with rules to prevent cheating and swindling (for example, supplying false quantities, overcharging, failure to pay, or selling poor quality goods). In a biblical story where God delivers moral guidelines to Moses which people must follow, dishonest measures and mismeasurement are explicitly prohibited: “You shall do no wrong in judgment, in measures of length or weight or quantity. You shall have just balances, just weights…" (Leviticus 19:35). Once standard measuring units existed, mathematics could begin to develop.

In fact, Marx argues the abstraction of labour in thought is the reflex of a real process, in which commercial trade in products not only alters the way labour is viewed, but also how it is practically treated. In other words, when labour becomes a commercial object traded in the marketplace, then the form and content of work in the workplace is transformed as well, to conform to commercial requirements. This transformation is practically possible, because labour already contains the potential to adapt to the requirements of capitalist business. This potential has already been shaped up by previous schooling and training. But Marx also comments that "The productiveness of labour that serves as [the] foundation and starting-point of [Capital], is a gift, not of nature, but of a history embracing thousands of centuries." In other words, human work abilities are the result of a very lengthy evolutionary social process, in which humans acquire the capacities and dispositions to do all kinds of tasks to survive and prosper.

If different products are exchanged in market trade according to specific trading ratios, Marx argues, the exchange process at the same time relates, values and commensurates the quantities of human labour expended to produce those products, regardless of whether the traders are consciously aware of that or not (see also value-form).

Therefore, Marx implies, the exchange process itself involves the making of a real abstraction, namely abstraction from (or indifference to) the particular characteristics of concrete (specific) labour that produced the commodities whose value is equated in trade.

At first, the relationship between quantities of traded commodities symbolically represents relative costs in labour time. This relationship is ordinarily quite transparent because goods are traded by the people who produced them. Next, money-prices begin to represent symbolically the commodities being traded. In this way, a system of symbolic representation emerges which can facilitate the exchange of the most diverse products with great efficiency. In the end, products as commodities become simply objects of value, and since their value can rise and fall, they can be bought and sold purely for capital gain. Closely related to this, is the growth of a cash economy, and Marx claims that:

"In proportion as exchange bursts its local bonds, and the value of commodities more and more expands into an embodiment of human labour in the abstract, in the same proportion the character of money attaches itself to commodities that are by Nature fitted to perform the social function of a universal equivalent. Those commodities are the precious metals."

In a more complex division of labour, it becomes difficult or even impossible to equate the value of all different labour-efforts directly. But money enables us to express and compare the value of all different labour-efforts—more or less accurately—in money-units (initially, quantities of gold, silver, or bronze). Marx then argues that labour viewed concretely in its specifics creates useful things, but labour-in-the-abstract is value-forming labour, which conserves, transfers and/or creates economic value (see Valorisation). In 1844, Marx said that:

"As money is not exchanged for any one specific quality, for any one specific thing, or for any particular human essential power, but for the entire objective world of man and nature, from the standpoint of its possessor it therefore serves to exchange every quality for every other, even contradictory, quality and object: it is the fraternisation of impossibilities. It makes contradictions embrace."

In the feudal society of medieval Europe, Marx comments,

"The natural form of labour, its specific kind—and not, as in a society of commodity production, its universality—is here its immediate social form. The corvee can be measured by time in just the same way as the labour which produces commodities, but every serf knows that what he expends in the service of his lord is a specific quantity of his own personal labour-power. The tithe owed to the priest is more clearly apparent than his blessing. Whatever we may think, then, of the different character masks with which people confront each other in such a society, the social relations between individuals in the performance of their labour appear at all events as their own personal relations, and are not disguised as social relations between things, between the products of labour. ... For a society of commodity producers—whose general social relation of production consists in the fact that they treat their products as commodities, hence as values, and in this business-like form bring their individual, private labours into relation with each other as homogenous human labour—Christianity with its religious cult of man in the abstract, more particularly in its bourgeois development, i.e. in Protestantism, Deism, etc., is the most fitting form of religion.")

== Abstract labour and capitalism ==
If the production process itself becomes organised as a specifically capitalist production process, then the abstraction process is deepened, because production labour itself becomes directly treated and organised in terms of its commercial exchange value, and in terms of its capacity to create new value for the buyer of that labour.

Quite simply, in this case, a quantity of labour-time is equal to a quantity of money, and it can be calculated that X hours of labour—regardless of who in particular performs them—create, or are worth, Y amounts of new product value. In this way, labour is practically rendered abstract.

The abstraction is completed when a labour market is established which very exactly quantifies the money-price applying to all kinds of different occupational functions, permitting equations such as:

X amount of qualified labour = Y amounts of unskilled labour = Z number of workers = P amount of money = Q amount of goods.

This is what Marx calls a value relationship ("Wertverhältnis" in German). It can also be calculated that it costs a certain amount of time and money to train a worker to perform a certain task, and how much value that adds to the workers' labour, giving rise to the notion of human capital.

As a corollary, in these conditions workers will increasingly treat the paid work they do as something distinct or separate from their personality, a means to an end rather than an end in itself. Work becomes "just work", it no longer necessarily says anything at all about the identity, creativity or personality of the worker. With the development of an average skill level in the workforce, the same job can also be done by many different workers, and most workers can do many different jobs; nobody is necessarily tied to one type of work all his life anymore. Thus we can talk of "a job" as an abstract function that could be filled by anybody with the required skills. Managers can calculate that with a certain budget, a certain number of paid working hours are required or available to do the work, and then divide up the hours into different job functions to be filled by suitably qualified personnel.

Marx's theory of alienation considers the human and social implications of the abstraction and commercialization of labour. His concept of reification reflects about the inversions of object and subject, and of means and ends, which are involved in commodity trade.

Marx regarded the distinction between abstract and concrete labour as being among the most important innovations he contributed to the theory of economic value, and subsequently Marxian scholars have debated a great deal about its theoretical significance.

=== Evolutionary or historically specific ===
For ultraleftist Marxists, abstract labour is an economic category which applies only to the capitalist mode of production, i.e. it applies only, when human labour power or work-capacity is universally treated as a commodity with a certain monetary cost or earnings potential. Thus Professor John Weeks claims that

"...only under capitalism is concrete labor in general metamorphosed into abstract labor, and only under capitalism is this necessary in order to bring about the reproduction of class relations."

The logical implication of this ultraleftist interpretation is, that if capitalism is destroyed (by the revolutionary Marxist Party and the working class), then abstract labour is also destroyed and eradicated.

Other Marx-scholars, such as Makoto Itoh, take a more evolutionary view (like Marx did and archaeologists do). They argue that the abstract treatment of human labour-time is something that evolved and developed in the course of the whole history of trade, or even precedes it, to the extent that primitive agriculture already involves attempts to economise labour, by calculating the comparative quantities of labour-time involved in producing different kinds of outputs.

In this sense, Marx already argued in his book A Contribution to the Critique of Political Economy (1859) that

"This abstraction, human labour in general, exists in the form of average labour which, in a given society, the average person can perform, productive expenditure of a certain amount of human muscles, nerves, brain, etc. It is simple labour [English economists call it "unskilled labour"] which any average individual can be trained to do and which in one way or another he has to perform. The characteristics of this average labour are different in different countries and different historical epochs, but in any particular society it appears as something given."

In the same text, Marx comments that

"Steuart knew very well that in pre-bourgeois eras also products assumed the form of commodities and commodities that of money; but he shows in great detail that the commodity as the elementary and primary unit of wealth and alienation [i.e. transfer of property or transfer of command over resources] as the predominant form of appropriation are characteristic only of the bourgeois period of production, and that accordingly labour which creates exchange-value is a specifically bourgeois feature."

Originally, in ancient society and medieval society ("premodern" or "pre-bourgeois" society), commodity production co-existed with subsistence production, a situation of "partial commodity production" (see also simple commodity production). When Marx discusses the origin and evolution of exchange, he notes that:

"This division of the product into a useful thing and a thing possessing value appears in practice only when exchange has already acquired a sufficient extension and importance to allow useful things to be produced for the purpose of being exchanged, so that their character as values has already to be taken into consideration during production. From this moment on, the labour of the individual producer acquires a twofold social character."

Such a division of labour featuring partial commodity production is already achieved in many different precapitalist societies, and consequently the category of abstract labour already existed in precapitalist societies. However, only under conditions of generalized commodity production in a capitalist society does abstract labour become a truly "universal" characteristic of production - because the vast majority of inputs and outputs of production are tradeable goods and services regulated by values and price-levels in competitive markets. The category of abstract labour is fully realized because it becomes an objectified quantity.

=== Skilled labour ===
Another controversy concerns the differences between unskilled (simple) and skilled (qualified) labour. Skilled labour costs more to produce than unskilled labour, and can be more productive. Generally Marx assumed that—irrespective of the price for which it is sold—skilled labour power had a higher value (it costs more to produce, in money, time, energy and resources), and that skilled work could produce a product with a higher value in the same amount of time, compared to unskilled labour. This was reflected in a skill hierarchy, and a hierarchy of wage-levels. In this sense, Friedrich Engels comments in Anti-Duhring:

"The product of one hour of compound labour is a commodity of a higher value—perhaps double or treble—in comparison with the product of one hour of simple labour. The values of the products of compound labour are expressed by this comparison in definite quantities of simple labour; but this reduction of compound labour is established by a social process which goes on behind the backs of the producers, by a process which at this point, in the development of the theory of value, can only be stated but not as yet explained. ... How then are we to solve the whole important question of the higher wages paid for compound labour? In a society of private producers, private individuals or their families pay the costs of training the qualified worker; hence the higher price paid for qualified labour-power accrues first of all to private individuals: the skilful slave is sold for a higher price, and the skilful wage-earner is paid higher wages.

Marx believed that the capitalist mode of production would over time replace people with machines, and encourage the easy replacement of one worker by another, and thus that most labour would tend to reduce to an average skill level and standardized norms of work effort. However he provided no specific calculus by which the value of skilled work could be expressed as a multiple of unskilled work, nor a theory of what regulates the valuation of skill differences. This has led to some theoretical debate among Marxian economists, but no definitive solution has yet been given. In the first volume of Das Kapital Marx had declared his intention to write a special study of the forms of labour-compensation, but he never did so. In contemporary society, a division is emerging between creative, skilled and specialized jobs attracting extraordinarily large salaries, and routine jobs paying very low salaries, where the enormous differences in pay rates are difficult to explain.

The economist Anwar Shaikh from the New School for Social Research has analyzed input-output data, wage data and labour data for the US economy, to create an empirically testable economic theory of the market valuation of skill differences. The counterargument is, that the valuation of skills in a heavily bureaucratized education system depends to a great extent on the balance of class forces between the rich educated class, and the "lower-skilled" working class. The rent-seeking educated class, on this view, can often raise its income far beyond the real worth of its work, if they occupy a privileged position, if its specialist skills happen to be in short supply or in demand, or if they are hired through the "old boy" networks. That is to say, to an extent, the assumed skill level of the employee may be more imaginary, than real; it all depends on how skills, experience and qualifications are defined and valued by privileged professionals whose rules reward their own kind the most. Skilled labour may be over-valued and unskilled labour under-valued at the same time.

== Criticism ==
Marx did not think there was anything particularly mysterious about the fact that people valued products because they have to spend time working to produce them, or to buy them. However, academics have made many objections to his idea. The conceptual issues associated with the idea of abstract labour have been one of the main reasons why many economists abandoned the labour theory of value. It may be that the problems have never been resolved because they have been approached far too abstractly, using conceptual distinctions not really adequate for the purpose.

Without referring explicitly to Marx's work on the labour theory of value of David Ricardo, the marginal utility theorist William Stanley Jevons clearly stated the main criticism of the concept of abstract labour in his 1871 treatise:

"Labour affects supply, and supply affects the degree of utility, which governs value, or the ratio of exchange. In order that there may be no possible mistake about this all-important series of relations, I will restate it in a tabular form, as follows:

- Cost of production determines supply;
- Supply determines final degree of utility;
- Final degree of utility determines value.

But it is too easy to go too far in considering labour as the regulator of value; it is equally to be remembered that labour is itself of unequal value. Ricardo, by a violent assumption, founded his theory of value on quantities of labour considered as one uniform thing. He was aware that labour differs infinitely in quality and efficiency, so that each kind is more or less scarce, and is consequently paid at a higher or lower rate of wages. He regarded these differences as disturbing circumstances which would have to be allowed for; but his theory rests on the assumed equality of labour. [My] theory rests on a wholly different ground. I hold labour to be essentially variable, so that its value must be determined by the value of the produce, not the value of the produce by that of the labour. I hold it to be impossible to compare a priori the productive powers of a navvy, a carpenter, an iron-puddler, a school master and a barrister. Accordingly, it will be found that not one of my equations represents a comparison between one man's labour and another's."

=== Response to these criticisms ===
Replying to this type of criticism, the Russian Marxist Isaak Illich Rubin argued that the concept of abstract labour was really much more complex than it seemed at first sight. He distinguished between "physically equal" labour, labour which is "socially equated" by means of consensual social evaluation or comparison, and labour efforts equated via the exchange of products using money as a universal equivalent.

To these three aspects we could add at least five others, which are also mentioned by Marx:

- the existence of normal labour-averages applying to different work tasks, which function as "labour norms" in any society;
- the gradation of many different labour efforts along one general, hierarchical dimension of worth, for the purpose of compensation;
- the universal exchangeability of labour efforts themselves, in a developed labour market;
- the general mobility of labour from one job or worksite to another; and
- the ability of the same workers to do all kinds of different jobs.

Some further aspects of the concept of abstract labour are provided by Marxian anthropologist Lawrence Krader and the mathematician Ulrich Krause. Possibly, these conceptual issues can be resolved, through a better empirical appreciation of the political economy of education, skills and the labour market.

== Recent discussion ==
In his book Crack Capitalism, John Holloway considers abstract labour as the most radical foundational category of Marx's theory, and therefore he recommends the struggle against abstract labour as the centrepiece of the political struggle against capitalism.

The British computer scientist Paul Cockshott in 2013 wrote a piece critical of the German Marxist academic Michael Heinrich who, Cockshott argued, wrongly reinterpreted the concept of abstract labour so that it is no longer a scientifically testable concept.

== See also ==
- Abstraction
- Critique of political economy
- Exchange value
- Labour power
- Labour theory of value
- Law of value
- Socially necessary labour time
- Value-form
- Working time
