= Neue Marx-Lektüre =

German school of Marxist theory

The Neue Marx-Lektüre (German for "New Marx Reading") is a school of thought in Marxist theory that originated in West Germany in the mid-1960s. It proposes a reconstruction of Karl Marx's critique of political economy by returning to his original texts and breaking with the interpretations of Marxism–Leninism and, to a lesser extent, Western Marxism. Key figures associated with its development include Hans-Georg Backhaus and Helmut Reichelt. The movement is characterized by its focus on what it terms the "esoteric" dimension of Marx's work—particularly his critique of fundamental economic forms such as value, money, and capital—as opposed to the "exoteric" dimension that appears compatible with traditional political economy.

The Neue Marx-Lektüre gained prominence in the context of the German student movement and the subsequent academic institutionalization of Marxist theory. Its central argument is that traditional Marxism misunderstood Marx's project, reducing his critique of social forms to a deterministic and transhistorical political economy. In contrast, the Neue Marx-Lektüre emphasizes the monetary character of value, the logical (rather than historical) structure of Das Kapital, the theory of state derivation (Staatsableitung), and a critical reappraisal of traditional revolutionary theories centered on class struggle. Although it originated in German-speaking academia, its influence has extended internationally, particularly in debates on value theory, the critique of political economy, and related critical currents such as Wertkritik (value-critique) and communisation theory.

== Etymology and definition ==
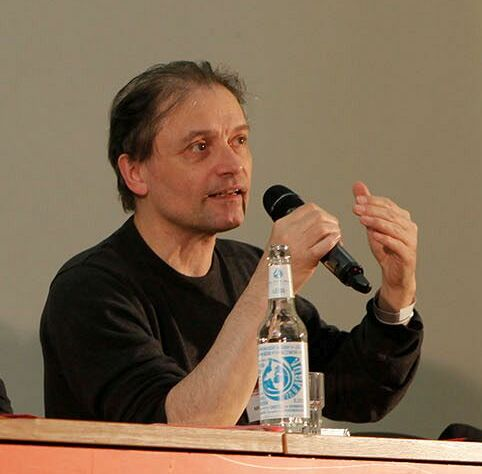
Michael Heinrich

The term Neue Marx-Lektüre was likely first used by Hans-Georg Backhaus in the 1970s and was later popularized by his students, such as Michael Heinrich. It designates a specific intellectual current that distinguishes itself from other contemporary interpretations like Neo-Marxism, "critical Marxism", or "capital-logical" Marxism by its specific methodological approach to reconstructing Karl Marx's theory. The movement is defined by its shared project of reconstructing the critique of political economy as a critique of the fundamental social forms of capitalist society, rather than as a simple economic analysis of its laws of motion or a philosophy of history.

According to Ingo Elbe, the Neue Marx-Lektüre can be understood in contrast to two other major paradigms of Marxist interpretation:

- Traditional Marxism (often synonymous with Marxism–Leninism): This paradigm, heavily influenced by Friedrich Engels's later works like Anti-Dühring and the prefaces to Das Kapital, presents Marxism as a comprehensive scientific worldview with universal laws applicable to both nature and society. Heinrich refers to this tradition as "worldview Marxism" (Weltanschauungsmarxismus), which he characterises by its crude economism, historical determinism, and simplistic formulas intended to provide a comprehensive explanation of the world. It interprets Marx's critique of political economy through a "logical-historical method", which views the progression of categories in Das Kapital as a simplified reflection of the historical development of economic relations. It also tends toward an instrumentalist theory of the state.
- Western Marxism: Originating after World War I with figures like Georg Lukács, Karl Korsch, and the Frankfurt School, this tradition rejected the scientism and determinism of traditional Marxism. It emphasized Marx's Hegelian-philosophical roots, the theory of reification, and the importance of praxis and ideology critique. However, according to Elbe, Western Marxism largely maintained a "silent orthodoxy" regarding Marx's economic theory, often treating it as a given and failing to subject its foundational categories to the same level of critical scrutiny. Heinrich notes that it was only in the 1960s and 1970s that Western Marxism began to re-examine the comprehensive meaning of "critique" in Marx's economic work.

The Neue Marx-Lektüre shares Western Marxism's critique of traditional Marxism's determinism but extends its critical focus to the core of Marx's economic works. It argues for an "esoteric" reading of Marx, which uncovers a radical critique of the very categories of political economy (value, labor, money, state), against an "exoteric" reading that presents Marx as a successor to classical economists like Adam Smith and David Ricardo.

== Origins and development ==
The Neue Marx-Lektüre emerged in West Germany from the mid-1960s, a period marked by the German student movement and a renewed academic interest in Marx's texts outside the confines of Social Democratic and Leninist party doctrines. Its genesis can be traced to several intellectual influences.

=== Frankfurt School and methodological debates ===
The most direct intellectual lineage of the Neue Marx-Lektüre is the Frankfurt School. While early critical theorists like Theodor W. Adorno developed a critique of identity logic and the "administered world," they did not fully extend this critique to a systematic reconstruction of Marx's value theory. The groundwork for the Neue Marx-Lektüre was laid by pupils of Adorno and Max Horkheimer, particularly Hans-Georg Backhaus and Helmut Reichelt, who are considered its pioneers. The catalyst for the movement was Backhaus's discovery of a copy of the first edition of Das Kapital in 1963. He formed a private reading group with Reichelt and others, where they noted significant differences from the second edition, particularly the presence of a more explicit "dialectical contradiction in the analysis of the 'equivalent form' of value". Reichelt later claimed that this discovery would have "had no consequences if it happened to someone who had not attended Adorno's lectures on the dialectical theory of society". Adorno's critical social theory—especially his concepts of an autonomized society, objective abstraction, and "the anamnesis of the genesis"—deeply influenced their value-form analysis. The project of the Neue Marx-Lektüre can thus be seen as an attempt to "deepen and even to ground Adorno's critical theory of society" through a concrete analysis of the form of value.

Backhaus's 1969 essay "On the Dialectic of the Value-Form", which originated in a 1965 seminar under Adorno, is considered the "initial spark" of the movement. Backhaus argued that the entire reception history of Marx's economic theory, including in the Marxist tradition, had been based on a "pre-monetary" misinterpretation of his theory of value, a misunderstanding initiated by Friedrich Engels's editorial interventions and reviews of Das Kapital. Reichelt's 1970 work On the Logical Structure of the Concept of Capital in Karl Marx further developed this by systematically reconstructing the logical sequence of Marx's categories as a non-historical, conceptual development. The Frankfurt colloquium of 1967 on the centenary of Das Kapital also served as a crucial forum where these ideas were first publicly debated.

The core project of the original Neue Marx-Lektüre was the reconstruction of Das Kapital, based on the premise that Marx's own presentation was not always clear or consistent and that a certain amount of theoretical work was needed to reveal its systematic core. Over time, this project faced internal criticism. Reichelt, for instance, later expressed doubts about whether a full reconstruction was possible or necessary. This skepticism marked the beginning of what has been called a "second generation of the Neue Marx-Lektüre" represented by figures like Heinrich, who questions the earlier assumption of a "hidden logic" or "inner coherence" in Marx's work that simply needed to be unearthed.

The Neue Marx-Lektüre is closely related to, but distinct from, the school of Wertkritik (value-critique) associated with theorists like Robert Kurz and the Krisis group. While both schools reject traditional Marxism and focus on the critique of value as an abstract form of domination, they differ in several respects. Neue Marx-Lektüre largely originated within academia and focuses on a rigorous reconstruction of Marx's texts, whereas Wertkritik emerged from a more extra-academic radical milieu. Wertkritik also extends its critique to the forms of subjectivity engendered by capitalism and posits that capitalist value is in a state of immanent crisis due to technological advancement, a position not central to the Neue Marx-Lektüre.

=== Rediscovery of early Soviet theorists ===
A significant impetus came from the rediscovery in the 1960s and 1970s of Soviet theorists from the 1920s who had been suppressed under Stalinism. The works of Isaak Rubin and Evgeny Pashukanis were particularly influential. Rubin's Essays on Marx's Theory of Value (1923; first published in German in 1973) provided a sophisticated reading of Marx's theory of value-form and fetishism, emphasizing that abstract labor is not a physiological category but a specific social form of labor constituted in the process of exchange. Pashukanis's The General Theory of Law and Marxism (1924) argued for a structural homology between the commodity form and the legal form, providing a foundational text for what would become the theory of state derivation. Elbe describes these theorists as a "Western Marxism in the East" for their focus on social form over deterministic laws.

=== Influence of French structuralism ===
Louis Althusser and the French structuralist school also played a crucial, though often critically appropriated, role. Althusser's call for a "symptomatic reading" of Marx's texts, his critique of historicism and Hegelian expressive totality, and his thesis of an "epistemological break" between the early and mature Marx provided important methodological tools. The Neue Marx-Lektüre adopted Althusser's anti-historicism and his insistence on the scientific rigor of Das Kapital but rejected his sharp separation of structure from praxis and his residual structural determinism. Proponents of the Neue Marx-Lektüre argued that Althusser, despite his innovations, failed to grasp the dialectical development of forms in Marx's work and thus could not provide an adequate theory of the categories of the critique of political economy. In contrast to Althusser's "epistemological break", the Neue Marx-Lektüre proposed a unitary reading, interpreting Marx's early writings through the lens of his later critique of political economy.

== Core tenets ==
=== Methodology: Esoteric vs. exoteric reading ===
A central methodological principle of the Neue Marx-Lektüre is the distinction between the "esoteric" and "exoteric" dimensions of Marx's work. This distinction, which Backhaus developed from a comment by Marx about Ricardo, posits that large parts of Marx's writings, particularly in Das Kapital, appear to operate within the framework of classical political economy (the exoteric dimension), while the true innovation of his work lies in its "esoteric" critique of the very constitution of these economic categories. This approach is often framed as a critique of political economy rather than a critical political economy. While a critical political economy seeks to provide a more equitable or efficient management of economic categories like value, labor, and money, a critique of political economy challenges the very existence of these categories as natural or transhistorical, aiming to explain why social relations in capitalism take these specific forms.

- The "exoteric" Marx appears to be a classical economist who corrects Ricardo's labor theory of value, treating value as a substance ("congealed labor") created in production and measured by labor time. This interpretation, promoted by Engels and traditional Marxism, leads to a "pre-monetary" theory of value.
- The "esoteric" Marx, in contrast, undertakes a critique of the social forms themselves. Value is not a substance but a social relation, a "phantom-like" or "spectral objectivity" (gespenstige Gegenständlichkeit) that is constituted through the act of exchange and only finds its objective expression in money. This esoteric core is revealed through a "symptomatic" or reconstructive reading that focuses on the logical development of the value-form.

This approach leads to a critique of the "logical-historical method" associated with Engels, which interprets the sequence of categories in Das Kapital (from commodity to money to capital) as a reflection of their historical appearance. The Neue Marx-Lektüre argues that this sequence is purely systematic and logical, designed to reconstruct the conceptual architecture—the "ideal average"—of a fully developed capitalist society. The project of reconstruction acknowledges that the esoteric argument is not always consistently presented by Marx, whose work can contain ambiguities between the esoteric and exoteric levels. Backhaus, for instance, argued that such misunderstandings "originat[e] in Marx himself".

=== Monetary theory of value ===
The most significant substantive contribution of the Neue Marx-Lektüre is its reconstruction of Marx's theory of value as a monetary theory. It rejects the traditional Marxist and Ricardian view that the value of a commodity is determined by the amount of labor time expended in its production and that money is merely a convenient technical instrument for measuring and circulating these pre-existing values. According to Hans-Georg Backhaus, Marx's value theory should be understood fundamentally as a "critique of pre-monetary theories of value". The Neue Marx-Lektüre's approach is "anti-substantialist", stressing the importance of abstraction and social validation through exchange. It argues:

1. Value is not a pre-monetary substance: Value is not an intrinsic property of commodities created in the sphere of production. Rather, it is a social relation constituted in the process of exchange, a category that is "fully actualised only within exchange". Value is bestowed upon commodities mutually in the act of exchange and does not exist in an isolated product.
2. Abstract labor is a social form, not a physiological one: Abstract labor, as the "substance" of value, is not the physiological expenditure of human energy. It is the specific social form of labor in capitalism, where private labors are validated as social only retroactively through exchange on the market. It achieves its objective reality only when represented in the universal equivalent, money. As a "real abstraction" performed in the act of exchange, independent of human consciousness, it constitutes a "relation of social validation" (Geltungsverhältnis).
3. Money is constitutive of value: The value of commodities can only be expressed and exist objectively in the form of money. Money is not a mere veil or technical tool but the necessary and sole phenomenal form of value. The development of the value-form from the simple to the money form in Das Kapital is thus a logical argument for the necessity of money for a system of commodity production. As Helmut Reichelt argued, the immanent contradiction within the commodity (between use-value and value) finds its external expression through the "doubling of the commodity" into the commodity itself and money. Money is thus not a thing, but rather what Backhaus called "the objectified social connection of isolated individuals".

This "monetary theory of value" critiques what it calls the "substantialist" fallacy of both classical political economy and traditional Marxism, which treat value as an inherent substance measurable in labor-hours. While the monetary theory of value is a central pillar, its specific implications have been subject to internal debate. During the 1990s, Michael Heinrich put forward a critical view of Marx's theory of money as a commodity. Following this, scholars like Ingo Stützle have argued that Marx's theory of commodity money, which posits that the money commodity (e.g., gold) has intrinsic value, clashes with the reality of post-Bretton Woods fiat money. In response, other theorists associated with the Neue Marx-Lektüre, such as Dieter Wolf, Stephan Krüger, and Ansgar Knolle-Grothusen, have defended Marx's theory of commodity money against these critiques.

=== State derivation (Staatsableitung) ===
The second major area of research within the Neue Marx-Lektüre is the theory of the state, known as the Staatsableitung (state derivation). Moving beyond the instrumentalist view of the state as a direct tool of the ruling class (as found in Lenin and traditional Marxism), the state derivation debate sought to explain the necessity of the separation of the political from the economic in capitalist societies.

The core argument is that the state's specific form—as an apparently neutral, public sphere separate from the private economic sphere—is logically derived from the nature of the commodity relation itself. Since social relations between private producers are mediated through things (commodities and money), society requires a separate instance that guarantees the general conditions of this exchange (e.g., property, contracts, legal equality). This instance, the state, must itself stand outside these private relations to secure them universally. The state's form as an abstract, public authority is therefore homologous to the abstract form of value. Its seeming neutrality and its function as the guarantor of freedom and equality are real, not merely illusory, but this very form secures the reproduction of the capital relation. The general capitalist interest that the state pursues is not a pre-existing entity but must be constantly constituted through a contested political process involving different fractions of capital and the lower classes.

=== Critique of traditional revolutionary theory ===
The Neue Marx-Lektüre also leads to a profound critique of what it terms "worker-movement Marxism" (Arbeiterbewegungsmarxismus). It questions the traditional assumption that the proletariat is the automatic revolutionary subject destined by history to overthrow capitalism.

- Critique of the proletariat as revolutionary subject: The theory rejects the idea that the experience of exploitation directly leads to a revolutionary consciousness. Instead, it emphasizes how capitalist social forms (fetishism) structure the consciousness of all classes, including the proletariat. The workers' struggle often remains immanent to the system, demanding "fairer" wages or recognition as commodity owners (of their labor power), rather than questioning the system of value itself. The Neue Marx-Lektüre is highly critical of historical determinism, arguing that although Marx sometimes made deterministic predictions, the core analysis of Das Kapital shows that a revolutionary development is "anything but inevitable".
- The "crisis of Marxism": By the late 1970s, many associated with the Neue Marx-Lektüre began to speak of a "crisis of Marxism", as the historical conditions that had supported traditional revolutionary strategies seemed to have disappeared. Some figures, such as Wolfgang Pohrt and Stefan Breuer, developed this into a "theory of decline" (Verfallsgeschichte), arguing that capitalism had become a "totally administered society" in which the very possibility of revolutionary transcendence had been foreclosed. This position, however, remains controversial within the broader current. Furthering this critique of traditional socialist politics, Hendrik Wallat has highlighted Marx's arguments against the anti-individualist tendencies within 19th-century socialism, arguing that Marx's project rejected both Etatism and a simple form of anarchism.

The political conclusions of the Neue Marx-Lektüre align it with other anti-labor currents in Marxist thought. Its critique of the affirmation of labor implies that communism cannot be achieved by liberating labor from capital, but only by abolishing labor itself. This has led to an affinity with the French theoretical current of communisation, which argues that revolution must consist in the immediate abolition of capitalist social relations (value, money, labor, the state) rather than a transitional period of workers' management. The recent surge of interest in communisation theory in the Anglophone world has contributed to the wider dissemination of the ideas of the Neue Marx-Lektüre.

== Criticism ==
A significant critique of the Neue Marx-Lektüre is its perceived formalism and its tendency to sideline class struggle. Critics argue that by focusing on the logical derivation of categories, the school presents a theory where "class antagonism... falls out of the... remit, or rather remains only as a logical derivative of the movement of the value-forms". This focus on a "conceptually logical system" is said to leave the Neue Marx-Lektüre "spellbound to the logic of things", causing it to lose sight of the antagonistic social relations and the "violence contained within them" that constitute these very forms. This is described as a "blind spot" shared with other form-analytic approaches like that of the Wertkritik school or Moishe Postone, namely the "separation between struggle and structure".

Other critics, writing from a perspective sympathetic to the Neue Marx-Lektüre's aims, have argued that the school "stops too early" in its reconstruction of Marx's work. According to this view, the early Neue Marx-Lektüre focused heavily on the analysis of circulation and the value-form in the opening chapters of Das Kapital, but did not fully extend this analysis to the constitution of capital as a "self-valorizing value" within the production process. This leads to a risk of reclaiming "Marx as a philosopher against Marx as an economist" and neglects the role of living labor in production as the ultimate source of capital's valorization and the site of social antagonism. Another technical criticism is that the school's focus on money as a pure form of value paid insufficient attention to Marx's argument that, in a commodity-based system, the universal equivalent must itself be a commodity ("money as a commodity"), a link which grounds the translation of monetary magnitudes back into labour magnitudes.

== See also ==
- Marx's theory of alienation
- Open Marxism

== Bibliography ==
- Helmut Reichelt, Zur logischen Struktur des Kapitalbegriffs bei Karl Marx [On the logical structure of the concept of capital according to Marx]. Dissertation of 10 July 1968, Faculty of Economics and Social Science, Universität Frankfurt am Main, 1968, p. 265; fourth revised edition, with a preface by Iring Fetscher, Frankfurt am Main: Europäische Verlagsanstalt, 1973 (Politische Ökonomie); Freiburg im Breisgau: Ça Ira, 2001, ISBN 3-924627-76-2.
- Hans-Georg Backhaus: Dialektik der Wertform. Untersuchungen zur Marxschen Ökonomiekritik [Dialectic of value: investigations of Marxist economic criticism], Freiburg im Breisgau 1997, ISBN 3-924627-52-5.
- Helmut Reichelt, Neue Marx-Lektüre. Zur Kritik sozialwissenschaftlicher Logik [New reading of Marx: On critique of social-scientific logic], Hamburg 2008, ISBN 978-3-89965-287-1.
