= Value-form =

Concept in Marxist theory

In Karl Marx's critique of political economy, the value-form is the social form that wealth takes in a society where commodity exchange is the dominant mode of production. Marx's analysis of the value-form, primarily in the first chapter of Capital, Volume I, argues that the value of commodities is not an intrinsic or natural property but a historically specific social one that must necessarily be expressed in a particular form: first as exchange value and ultimately as money. The theory of the value-form is central to Marx's argument that economic categories like value, money, and capital are not transhistorical tools of analysis but rather expressions of specific, antagonistic social relations of production.

Marx's analysis traces a logical, not historical, development of the value-form through four stages. It begins with the "simple form", where the value of one commodity is expressed in a single other commodity. This simple relation already reveals a fundamental polarity between the "relative form" (the commodity whose value is being expressed) and the "equivalent form" (the commodity that serves as the expression of value). This develops into the "expanded form", where a commodity's value is expressed in a multitude of other commodities, and then the "general form", where all commodities express their value in a single, universal equivalent. The dialectic culminates in the "money form", where a specific commodity (historically, gold) is socially set apart to serve as the universal equivalent, becoming money. As the necessary outcome of the commodity's dual character, this makes Marx's theory a "monetary theory of value".

The theory is foundational to Marx's concept of commodity fetishism, whereby the social relations between producers are concealed and appear instead as objective, quasi-natural relations between things. The existence of value and its necessary expression as money are, for Marx, consequences of a specific type of labor—privately undertaken labor whose social character is only validated post-production, through exchange in the market (abstract labor). This understanding distinguishes Marx's value theory from the labor theory of value of classical economics, which he argued failed to analyze why labor creates value and why that value must take the form of money. Modern scholarship in value-form theory builds on this analysis, emphasizing the inseparability of value from its form of appearance and viewing value as co-constituted in both production and exchange.

== Context: Critique of classical political economy ==
Karl Marx

Diagram illustrating Marx's theory of value

Marx's analysis of the value-form is a cornerstone of his critique of classical economics, particularly the work of Adam Smith and David Ricardo. The subtitle of Capital—A Critique of Political Economy—signifies that Marx intended not just to correct or supplement classical theory, but to critique the entire science and its foundational assumptions. Marx argued that while classical political economists correctly identified labor as the substance of value, they failed to investigate the form of value. They treated the value-form as "something entirely indifferent or external to the nature of the commodity itself," thereby overlooking the crucial question of why this substance (labor) assumes that particular form (value, expressed as money). While Ricardo's analysis focused on determining the magnitude of value and used labor as a numéraire to measure heterogeneous goods, Marx's primary question was to understand how economic value expresses the specific, contradictory social relations of capitalism. As Marx himself concluded at the end of his analysis of the value-form:

Political economy has indeed analysed value and its magnitude, however incompletely, and has uncovered the content concealed within these forms. But it has never once asked the question why this content has assumed that particular form, that is to say, why labour is expressed in value, and why the measurement of labour by its duration is expressed in the magnitude of the value of the product.

For Marx, value is not a transhistorical or natural property of goods but a historically specific social form unique to societies dominated by commodity production. The classical labor theory of value, by treating value as simply embodied labor-time, presented an asocial theory applicable to all societies. In contrast, Marx’s theory is a "truly social" one, concerned exclusively with the specific social form of labor in capitalism: "commodity-producing labour," which he terms "practically abstract" labor. This form of labor is private and asocial in its immediate execution, and its social character is only validated indirectly and after the fact, through the exchange of its products on the market. The distinction between a product's material content (its "natural form") and its "social form" is central to this analysis.

According to philosopher Patrick Murray, the failure of classical political economy to analyze the specificity of the value-form is a symptom of its confinement within the "bourgeois horizon," a mindset that naturalizes the categories of capitalist society and presents them as eternal. Unlike classical or neoclassical economics, which tend to start from the rational considerations of isolated individuals, Marx's analysis begins from the social relations that impose a certain rationality on those individuals. Marx's analysis of the value-form, therefore, aims to demonstrate that value, money, and the market are not mere technical conveniences for exchange but are themselves expressions of a specific, and contradictory, social structure. In pursuing this analysis, Marx presupposes the capitalist mode of production from the outset, rather than beginning with a hypothetical society of "simple commodity producers." His object is not a particular historical capitalism, but capitalism in its "ideal average."

== Dialectic of the value-form in Capital ==
In Section 3 of Chapter One of Capital, titled "The Value-Form or Exchange-Value," Marx presents a "dialectical argument for the necessity of money in order to express value." Recognizing the section's difficulty, Marx advised readers in the preface to the first edition that they could initially skip it and read a simplified version he included in an appendix. In his late polemical work Notes on Adolph Wagner, Marx clarified that his starting point was not an abstract "concept of value" but "the simplest social form in which the labour-product is presented in contemporary society, and this is the 'commodity'." The analysis traces the logical development of the form through which the value of a commodity is expressed. The development is a conceptual reconstruction of the connections within contemporary capitalism, not a historical account of the emergence of money.

=== I. Simple form of value ===
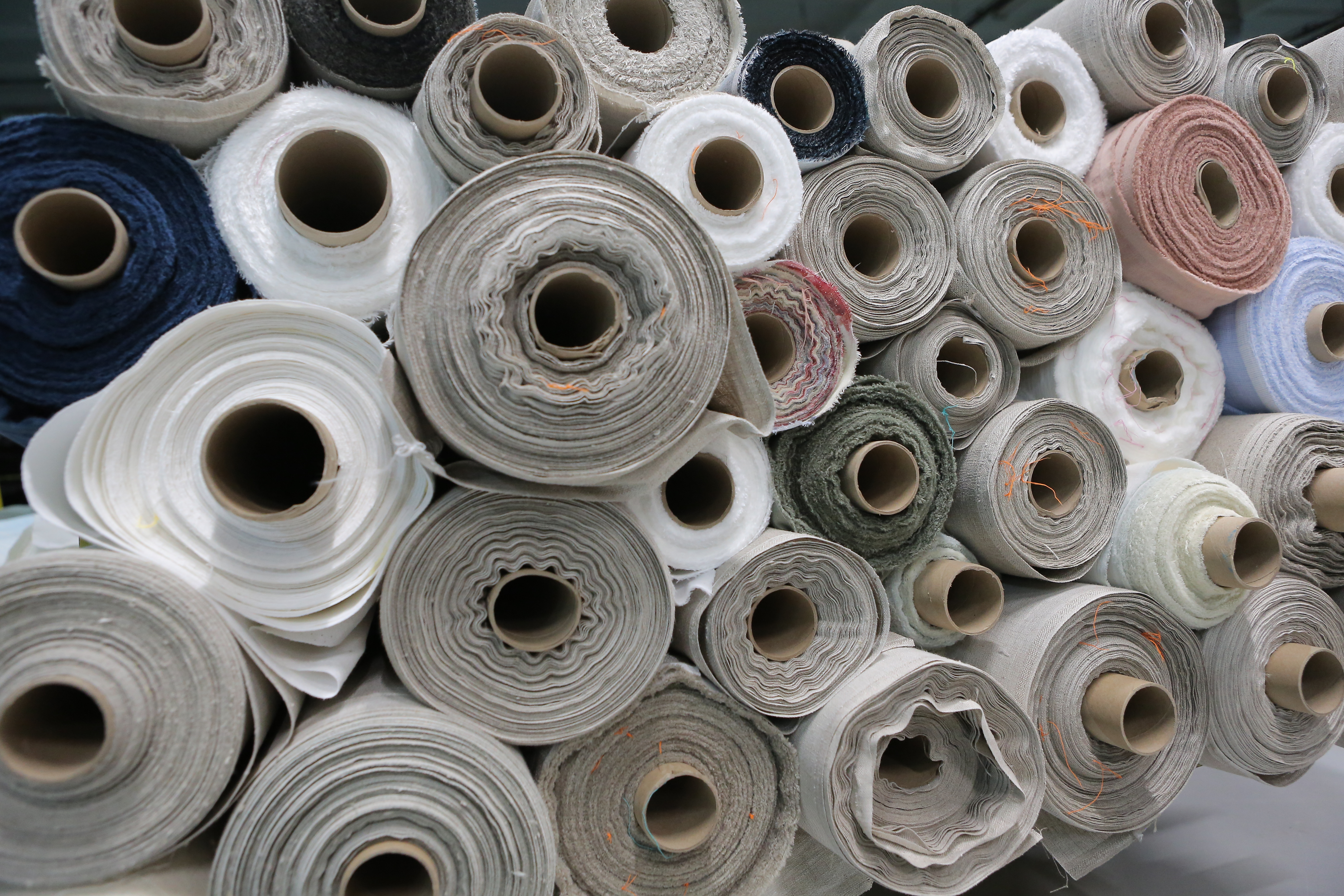
Rolls of linen

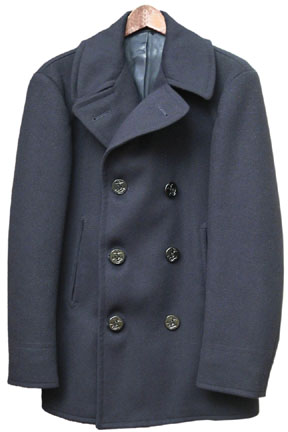
Pea coat

The analysis begins with the simplest value-relation between two commodities, which Marx calls the "simple", "isolated", or "accidental form" of value. This relation is expressed in an equation like:

x commodity A = y commodity B (e.g., 20 yards of linen = 1 coat)

This simple expression reveals a fundamental polarity. The two commodities play different roles:

- The "relative form": Commodity A (the linen) plays an active role, expressing its value in another commodity. Its value is shown relative to commodity B.
- The "equivalent form": Commodity B (the coat) plays a passive role, serving as the material in which value is expressed. It functions as the equivalent of commodity A.

Marx emphasizes that these two forms are "inseparable moments, which belong to and mutually condition each other; but, at the same time, they are mutually exclusive or opposed extremes, i.e. poles of the expression of value." A commodity cannot be in both poles of the same expression simultaneously; it cannot express its value in itself. Its value can only appear in the use-value of another commodity. This "relationship of validation" (Geltungsverhältnis) means that the coat not simply is value, but counts as value within this specific social relation. The simple form thus represents the "internal opposition between use-value and value, hidden within the commodity" as an "external opposition" between two commodities. However, this form is deficient because it expresses a commodity's value in only one other commodity, failing to represent its "qualitative equality with all other commodities and its quantitative proportionality to them."

=== II. Total or expanded form of value ===
The second form, the "total" or "expanded form" of value, overcomes the limitation of the simple form by expressing the value of a single commodity (e.g., linen) in a series of all other commodities:

$$\begin{matrix}
A = B \\
A = C \\
A = D \\
A = \dots
\end{matrix}$$

or

$$\begin{matrix}
20 \text{ yards of linen} = 1 \text{ coat} \\
20 \text{ yards of linen} = 10 \text{ lbs. of tea} \\
20 \text{ yards of linen} = 40 \text{ lbs. of coffee} \\
20 \text{ yards of linen} = \dots
\end{matrix}$$

This form makes explicit that the value of the linen remains the same regardless of which particular use-value it is equated with. However, this form is also defective. First, the series of value expressions is endless, incomplete, and without closure. Second, it is a "motley mosaic of disparate and unconnected expressions of value," a heterogeneous series lacking a unified form. Each commodity has its own expanded value-form, different from that of every other commodity.

=== III. General form of value ===
The "general form" of value reverses the expanded form in a conceptual transition, not a historical one. Instead of one commodity expressing its value in all others, all commodities now express their value in a single, socially recognized equivalent commodity:

$$\begin{matrix}
B = A \\
C = A \\
D = A \\
\dots = A
\end{matrix}$$

or

$$\begin{matrix}
1 \text{ coat} = 20 \text{ yards of linen} \\
10 \text{ lbs. of tea} = 20 \text{ yards of linen} \\
40 \text{ lbs. of coffee} = 20 \text{ yards of linen} \\
\dots = 20 \text{ yards of linen}
\end{matrix}$$

With this form, commodities "present their values to us, (1) in a simple form, because in a single commodity; (2) in a unified form, because in the same commodity each time." They are now related to each other as values and appear to each other as exchange-values; for the first time, their value obtains a form that expresses its social character. This form can only arise as the "joint contribution of the whole world of commodities." However, this form is also unstable. Any commodity can theoretically serve as the universal equivalent, but for the form to achieve "objective fixedness and general social validity," this role must be exclusively restricted to a specific commodity through social convention.

=== IV. Money form ===
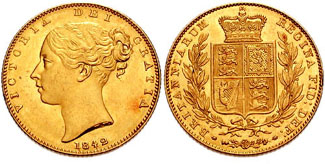
British gold sovereign featuring Queen Victoria, 1842

The final step is the "money form", where one particular commodity (e.g., gold) is historically and socially set apart to serve as the universal equivalent. This final transition is not a further conceptual development but the result of "social custom" solidifying the general form onto one commodity. At this point, the universal equivalent has acquired a stable and objective social character, becoming money.

$$\begin{matrix}
1 \text{ coat} = 2 \text{ ounces of gold} \\
10 \text{ lbs. of tea} = 2 \text{ ounces of gold} \\
40 \text{ lbs. of coffee} = 2 \text{ ounces of gold} \\
\dots = 2 \text{ ounces of gold}
\end{matrix}$$

The money-form is the necessary outcome of the contradictions inherent in the commodity-form itself. Money is not an external instrument invented to solve the problems of barter; it is a social relation that arises necessarily from the nature of commodity exchange. Because value must be expressed and can only be expressed adequately in the money form, Marx's theory is described as a "monetary theory of value". At this stage, the value of a commodity is expressed in its price.

=== The logic of the concrete ===
Marx's analysis of the value-form does not follow the rules of formal logic but rather what has been termed "the logic of the concrete." Although the value relation is a relation of equivalence, it systematically violates the formal logical properties of an equivalence relation: reflexivity, symmetry, and transitivity.

- Reflexivity fails because a commodity cannot express its own value. The expression "20 yards of linen = 20 yards of linen" is not an expression of value but a tautology that asserts a certain quantity of a use-value. Value can only be expressed in a relation between different commodities.
- Symmetry is problematic because the two sides of the value equation, the relative and equivalent forms, are not interchangeable. In the expression "x = y," the positions are qualitatively different. The equivalent form (y) actively represents value, while the relative form (x) has its value represented. If the equation is reversed to "y = x," it constitutes a new, distinct expression of value, not the same one viewed from another angle.
- Transitivity breaks down in the money-form. Even if one ton of iron equals an ounce of gold, and an ounce of gold equals a pound of saffron, it does not follow that the iron is directly exchangeable for the saffron. The money commodity (gold) has achieved a special social status of "immediate exchangeability" that other commodities lack. An owner of saffron will accept gold for their commodity but not necessarily iron, even if the iron has an equivalent price.

This violation of formal logic occurs because the value-form is not a mere intellectual abstraction but the form of appearance of a real social relation. The analysis traces the development of contradictions in the concrete social process of exchange, not the elaboration of a formal concept.

== Key characteristics ==
=== Polarity and antagonism ===
A central feature of the value-form is its polarity. Marx emphasizes that the relative and equivalent forms are "poles of the expression of value." This polarity is not merely a formal distinction but expresses a real social antagonism. The commodity (in the relative form) represents private, particular labor and has yet to prove its social necessity, while money (in the equivalent form) represents abstract, universal social labor and possesses immediate social validity. The commodity must be sold for money to validate the labor expended on it as a part of the total social labor.

This split contains the abstract possibility of economic crisis. The exchange process is divided into two independent acts, sale (C-M) and purchase (M-C). The connection between the producer of a commodity and the satisfaction of a social need is not direct but is mediated by money. If a commodity cannot be sold, the labor-time spent on it is wasted, and the circuit is broken. As Marx puts it, "if the assertion of their external independence proceeds to a certain critical point, their unity violently makes itself felt by producing—a crisis." Marx notes that it is "by no means self-evident that the form of direct and universal exchangeability is an antagonistic form, as inseparable from its opposite, the form of non-direct exchangeability." Recognizing this necessary antagonism is a major, if often overlooked, discovery of Marx's analysis.

=== Fetish character ===
The analysis of the value-form is the basis for Marx's theory of commodity fetishism. The "mystical character" of the commodity arises not from its use-value but from the value-form itself. Because the social character of private labor is expressed only through the exchange of products, the social relations between producers take on "the fantastic form of a relation between things." This is not simply a matter of "false consciousness" or a mere "fantasy"; it is a real phenomenon that reflects the actual situation in which direct social relations between producers do not exist. As Marx states, for the producers, their social relations "appear as what they are, i.e. they do not appear as direct social relations between persons in their work, but rather as material relations between persons and social relations between things."

The value of a commodity—its "ghostly objectivity" (gespenstige Gegenständlichkeit) or "sensuous extrasensory" (sinnlich übersinnliches) quality—is a purely social and "suprasensible" property revealed only by analysis. This social objectivity appears to be a "socio-natural property" of the products themselves. This becomes a material force that controls the producers, whose "own movement within society has for them the form of a movement made by things, which... in fact control them."

The money-form completes this mystification. Money, a physical object, appears to possess its social power of universal exchangeability by nature. The social process that establishes money as the universal equivalent "vanishes in its own result, leaving no trace behind." Money becomes the "real existence" of the absurdity of an abstract category (value) existing as a tangible thing alongside concrete commodities. This displacement of a social relation onto a thing is what makes money a fetish and gives rise to "the illusion of the economic"—the idea that the economy is a natural, asocial sphere governed by the relations between things rather than people. The categories of bourgeois economics are themselves "objective forms of thought" that arise from and are trapped within this fetishism.

=== Philosophical foundations ===
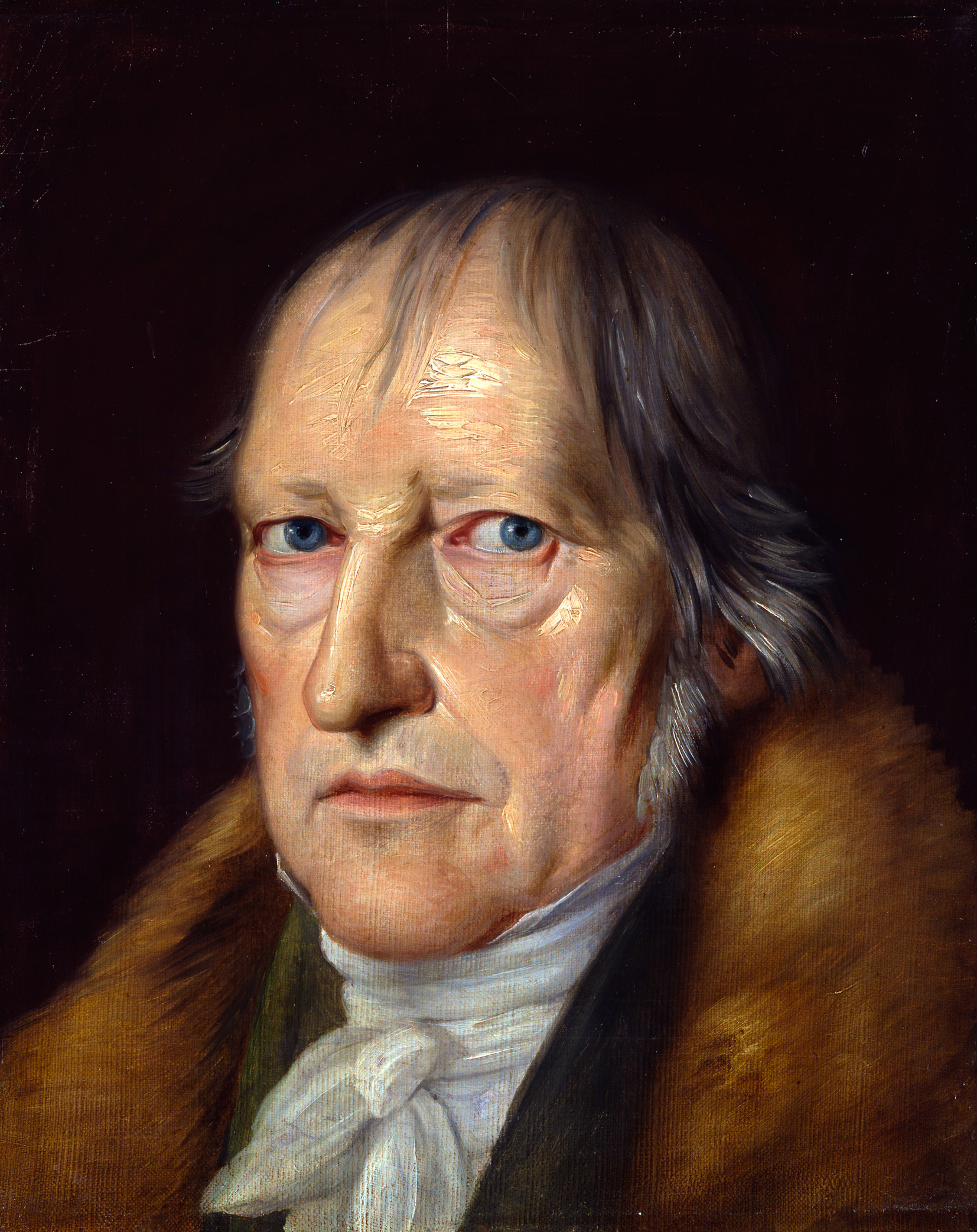
Georg Wilhelm Friedrich Hegel

Marx's analysis of the value-form is deeply influenced by Georg Wilhelm Friedrich Hegel's logic of essence. Following Hegel's approach to the form–content relation, Marx treats form not as something external to content (as in the philosophy of Immanuel Kant), but as something that necessarily grows out of the content itself. Conventional thinking (which Hegel called the logic of the Verstand or understanding) treats essence and appearance as separate and independent; essence is a hidden reality, and appearance is its external manifestation. Hegel's dialectical logic of essence, by contrast, holds that essence and appearance are inseparable. Essence has no reality apart from its appearance; it must appear, and it must appear as something other than itself.

Marx applies this logic to the relationship between value and price. Value is the essence, and price (or exchange-value) is its necessary form of appearance. Value cannot exist independently of its expression in money, just as price is incomprehensible without the concept of value that it expresses. They are not independent and dependent variables, as in conventional price theory, but rather two inseparable moments of a single complex reality. This dialectical understanding allows Marx to show why value, a purely social and abstract property, must take the material form of money. Michael Heinrich notes, however, that Marx is cautious in his use of philosophical language, consciously avoiding the term "essence" (Wesen) in the first chapter of Capital and warning against imposing a "ready-made scheme on Marx's text".

The overall method of exposition in Capital has been interpreted as comprising an initial phase of "Analysis," which moves from the commodity to the concept of value, followed by a phase of "Synthesis," which develops the forms of value from that concept. Similarly to the relationship between value and price, surplus-value (the essence) must appear as profit (the appearance), a transformation that is central to Marx's theory of profit.

== Interpretive debates ==
Modern interpretations known as value-form theory emphasize the centrality of the value-form to Marx's entire critique of capitalism. This approach distinguishes itself from "Ricardian Marxism," which is seen as adopting the classical labor theory of value while ignoring its social-form dimension. These traditional or "substantialist" interpretations are criticized as "pre-monetary theories of value" for attempting to analyze value without reference to money.

Value-form theorists generally maintain that value and its magnitude are not determined in production alone, independent of exchange. Different variants exist within this school of thought:

- The exchange-only view, pioneered by Samuel Bailey, holds that value is constituted exclusively in the act of exchange. This view collapses the distinction between value and exchange-value. Marx criticized Bailey for this, arguing that he confused value with its form of appearance.
- The production-only view, often associated with the Temporal Single System Interpretation (TSSI), argues that a commodity's value is fully determined in production, prior to its sale. This view is criticized by value-form theorists for reverting to a pre-Marxian, Ricardian position that severs value from its necessary form of appearance in money.
- The co-constitutive view, which is strongly associated with the Neue Marx-Lektüre (New Marx Reading), holds that value is co-constituted in both production and circulation. Value arises out of production as a "potential," but its magnitude is not fully determinate until it is "actualized" through the "final act of social validation, the sale of the commodity." In this view, value is not a property inherent to an individual commodity but a "social substance" that is "held in common" (gemeinschaftlich) by commodities within the exchange relation. As Michael Heinrich summarizes, "products acquire value objectivity 'only by being exchanged'." Exchange does not create value but is the social process through which the private, concrete labor of the producer is reduced to abstract social labor and validated as a component of society's total labor.

This debate hinges on whether to treat value and its form of appearance (price) as separable. Proponents of the co-constitutive view argue that separating them constitutes a "bad abstraction," a failure to recognize the dialectical inseparability of essence and appearance. This is reinforced by Marx's distinction between the "immanent" measure of value (labor-time) and its "external" measure (money), which implies that labor-time cannot serve as a direct, practical measure of value; only money can fulfill that role.

== See also ==
- Law of value
- Marx's theory of alienation
- Real and ideal prices
