= Cost-of-production theory of value =

Economic theory that determines value based on production costs

In economics, the cost-of-production theory of value is the theory that the price of an object or condition is determined by the sum of the cost of the resources that went into making it. The cost can comprise any of the factors of production (including labor, capital, or land) and taxation.

The theory makes the most sense under assumptions of constant returns to scale and the existence of just one non-produced factor of production. With these assumptions, minimal price theorem, a dual version of the so-called non-substitution theorem by Paul Samuelson, holds. Under these assumptions, the long-run price of a commodity is equal to the sum of the cost of the inputs into that commodity, including interest charges.

== Historical development of the theory ==
Historically, the best-known proponent of such theories is probably Adam Smith. Piero Sraffa, in his introduction to the first volume of the "Collected Works of David Ricardo", referred to Smith's "adding-up" theory. Smith contrasted natural prices with market price. In Smith’s model, market prices tend toward natural prices over time, as competition among producers pushes prices toward a long-run equilibrium. Smith theorized that the natural price reflects the simple sum of costs (wages, profit, and rent), whereas the market price may deviate in the short term due to fluctuations in demand or scarcity.(Smith is ambiguous about whether rent is price determining or price determined. The latter view is the consensus of later classical economists, with the Ricardo-Malthus-West theory of rent.)

David Ricardo mixed this cost-of-production theory of prices with the labor theory of value, as that latter theory was understood by Eugen von Böhm-Bawerk and others. This is the theory that prices tend toward proportionality to the socially necessary labor embodied in a commodity. Ricardo sets this theory at the start of the first chapter of his Principles of Political Economy and Taxation, but contextualizes it as only relating to commodities with elastic supply. Taknaga advances a new interpretation that Ricardo had cost-of-production theory of value from the start and presents a more coherent interpretation based on texts of Principles of Political Economy and Taxation. This alleged refutation leads to what later became known as the transformation problem. Karl Marx later takes up that theory in the first volume of Capital, while indicating that he is quite aware that the theory is untrue at lower levels of abstraction. This has led to all sorts of arguments over what both David Ricardo and Karl Marx "really meant". Nevertheless, it seems undeniable that all the major classical economics and Marx explicitly rejected the labor theory of price().

A somewhat different theory of cost-determined prices is provided by the "neo-Ricardian School" of Piero Sraffa and his followers. Yoshnori Shiozawa presented a modern interpretation of Ricardo's cost-of-production theory of value.

The Polish economist Michał Kalecki distinguished between sectors with "cost-determined prices" (such as manufacturing and services) and those with "demand-determined prices" (such as agriculture and raw material extraction).

== Market price ==
Market price is a familiar economic concept: it is the price that a good or service is offered at, or will fetch, in the marketplace. It is of interest mainly in the study of microeconomics. Market value and market price are equal only under conditions of market efficiency, equilibrium, and rational expectations.

In economics, returns to scale and economies of scale are related terms that describe what happens as the scale of production increases. They are different, non-interchangeable concepts.

== Labor theory of value ==
The labor theories of value are economic theories according to which the true values of commodities are related to the labor needed to produce them.

There are many accounts of labor value, with the common element that the "value" of an exchangeable good or service is, or ought to be, or tends to be, or can be considered as, equal or proportional to the amount of labor required to produce it (including the labor required to produce the raw materials and machinery used in production).

Different labor theories of value prevailed among classical economists through the mid-19th century. This theory is especially associated with Adam Smith and David Ricardo. Since that time, it has been most often associated with Marxian economics, while among modern mainstream economists it is considered to be superseded by the marginal utility approach.

== Taxes and subsidies ==
A supply and demand diagram illustrating taxes' effect on prices.

Taxes and subsidies change the price of goods and services. A marginal tax on the sellers of a good will shift the supply curve to the left until the vertical distance between the two supply curves is equal to the per unit tax; other things remaining equal, this will increase the price paid by the consumers (which is equal to the new market price) and decrease the price received by the sellers. Marginal subsidies on production will shift the supply curve to the right until the vertical distance between the two supply curves is equal to the per unit subsidy; other things remaining equal, this will decrease price paid by the consumers (which is equal to the new market price) and increase the price received by the producers.

== See also ==
- Outline of industrial organization
- Outline of production
- Output (economics)
- List of economics topics
- Price
- Prices of production
- Pricing strategies
- Production (economics)
