= Socially necessary labour time =

Amount of time performed by an average worker to produce a given commodity

Socially necessary labour time in Marx's critique of political economy is what regulates the exchange value of commodities in trade. In short, socially necessary labour time refers to the average quantity of labour time that must be performed under currently prevailing conditions to produce a commodity.

Unlike individual labour hours in the classical labour theory of value formulated by Adam Smith and David Ricardo, Marx's exchange value is conceived as a proportion (or 'aliquot part') of society's labour-time.

Marx did not define this concept in computationally rigorous terms, allowing for flexibility in using it in specific instances to relate average levels of labour productivity to social needs manifesting themselves as monetarily effective market demand for commodities.

Mathematically formalizing the relationship between socially necessary labour and commodity value is difficult, due to incessantly shifting social, physical or technical circumstances affecting the labour process.

== Simplified explanation of the concept ==
In a market economy, labour expenditures in producing outputs and the market demand for those outputs are constantly adjusting to each other. This is a complex process, in which enterprises operating at varying levels of productivity and unit-costs compete with each other in responding to the expansion and contraction of total market demand for their output. In the third volume of Das Kapital, Marx discusses how the market value (or "regulating price") of a commodity may be determined under different conditions of demand and productivity.

A given mass of new value is produced in a given time, but if and how this new value is realised in money terms and distributed as income and reinvestment is finally established only after products are sold at specific market prices. If the market for a commodity is oversupplied, then labour-time has been expended in excess of what was socially necessary, and exchange value falls. If the market for a commodity is undersupplied, then the labour-time expended on its production has been less than what is socially necessary, and exchange value rises.

The simplest definition of socially necessary labour time is the amount of labour time performed by a worker of average skill and productivity, working with tools of the average productive potential, to produce a given commodity. This is an "average unit labour-cost", measured in working hours.

If the average productivity is that of a worker who produces a commodity in one hour, while a less skilled worker produces the same commodity in four hours, then in these four hours the less skilled worker will have only contributed one hour's worth of value in terms of socially necessary labour time. Each hour worked by the unskilled worker will only produce a quarter of the social value produced by the average worker.

But the production of any commodity generally requires both labour and some previously produced means of production (or capital goods), like tools and materials. The amount of labour so required is called the direct labour input into the commodity. Yet the required capital goods have in their turn been produced (in the past) by labour and other capital goods; and so on for these other capital goods, and so on. The sum of all the amounts of labour, that were direct inputs into this backwards-stretching series of capital goods produced in the past, is called the indirect labour input into the commodity. Putting together the direct and indirect labour inputs, one finally gets the total labour input into the commodity, which may also be called the total embodied labour in it, or its direct and indirect labour contents.

However, by "socially necessary labour" Marx refers specifically to the total labour-time which on average is currently required to produce an output. It is this current labour cost which determines the value of output. So in a developed market Marx's exchange value refers to the average quantity of living labour which must be performed under currently prevailing conditions to produce a commodity. These conditions are incessantly changing, both in relation to quality of labour, quality of machinery, quality of distribution, and volumes of labour, machinery, sales in the branch, so estimating 'current' requirements is very much an exercise in approximation and dependent on the scales involved.

== Operation of the law of value ==
If producers produce commodities below the socially average labour-cost, they obtain extra profit upon sale at the ruling market prices, and conversely those producing at above this cost make a proportionate loss. A constant incentive therefore exists to reduce labour-costs by increasing the productivity of the labour force.

This can be done through higher exploitation, economising on costs, and better equipment. The long-run effect is that it takes less and less labour-time to produce a commodity. Enterprises cannot usually do very much about reducing their fixed input costs, because these are rarely under their control. But they can always try to reduce their labour costs.

"Socially necessary labour" therefore refers to at least three economic relationships:

- between the specific productivity of a producer and the average productivity in his branch;
- between the outputs of the branch of production and social needs manifested in monetarily effective demand; and
- between the output of a producer, and the output of the whole branch (that can be sold).

In other words, we have to distinguish between

- labour time necessary for the production of a given amount of a commodity—this quantity defines the aggregate value of the output, arising from the nature of a commodity as a bearer of exchange-value;
- the quantity of labour time socially necessary to produce the appropriate amount of the product, i.e. the amount of a product which at the production price meets the effective demand for it—this quantity defines the correspondence between the total quantity of the commodity produced as use-values and the effective demand for those use-values.

The former determines the unit value of commodities, hence their production price, and the latter determines the discrepancy between actual supply and effective demand, hence the discrepancy between market price and production price.

== Marx and Ricardo ==
Marxist value theory treats economic value, i.e. exchange value, as an attribute of labour-products/commodities which exists by virtue of social relations of production in the capitalist mode of production. Thus, value is a purely social characteristic of commodities. The substance of the value of a commodity is a determinate quantity of social labour.

That is, the existence of exchange value presupposes social relations between people organised into a society. "Socially necessary labour time" encapsulates this essential "relatedness" of value—it is labour time assessed in relation to social needs, not merely labour time performed.

This distinction demarcates Marx from other political economists, but is often overlooked in accounts of Marx's value theory. Marx understood that the casual reader might mistakenly treat his category as interchangeable with its Ricardian predecessor, and in later editions and the Afterword to the Second German Edition implores readers to pay particular attention to the mediations between that old category and the one his own theory sought to establish. Marx's concept of value is not intended to be an equilibrium price. He does not assume market equilibrium, but aims to explain how the process of convergence between supply and demand practically occurs, that is, why supply and demand meet at a given price point when a sale is realised in a specific market.

== Criticism ==
Marx's interpretation of value from the perspective of society as whole proved elusive for many critics. Marx tried to answer them in a letter: "the masses of products corresponding to different needs require different and quantitatively determined masses of the total labour of society...What can change in historically different circumstances is only the form in which these [economic] laws assert themselves. And the form in which this proportional distribution of labour asserts itself, in a state of society where the interconnection of social labour is manifested in the private exchange of the individual products of labour, is precisely the exchange value of these products."

Despite these comments, Marx has been criticised strongly for adding the "socially necessary" qualification to labour time by the libertarian philosopher Robert Nozick in Anarchy, State, and Utopia, for whom it is an unjustified 'bolt-on' aspect of Marx's theory.

One debate in Marxian economics concerns the question of whether the product-values formed and traded include both direct and indirect labour, or whether these product-values refer only to current average production costs (or the value of current average replacement costs).

Mirowski (1989) for example accuses Marx of vacillating between a field theory (labour-time currently socially necessary) and a substance theory of value (embodied labour-time). This kind of criticism is due to a confusion of the process of labour in general (adding use to a product, which under capitalism equates adding value to a commodity) with the task of quantifying the exchange value added. The general process affixes labour time to a commodity, and providing the commodity functions as such the quantity of labour time is immaterial—an abstract unknown, so to speak—and can be expressed in many ways, e.g. "embodied in", "attached to", "associated with", etc. Quantifying the amount of labour time associated with commodities requires focus on the social, shifting character of socially necessary labour, and specifically recognition that the quantities are 'current' i.e. incessantly changing. Today's value is different from yesterday's and tomorrow's, and the amount of value can only be determined numerically on the basis of a given point in time at which values are realized simultaneously at specific prices.

Thus Marx's theory is best interpreted as a field theory, but for the reasons just stated, modelling the determination of value by socially necessary labour time mathematically is a difficult exercise.

== See also ==
- Critique of political economy
- Labour time calculation
- Moishe Postone
- Surplus labour

== Note ==
The concept of socially necessary labour time is discussed on the OPE-L list (Outline of Political Economy)
