= Labor theory of value =

Theory in classical and Marxian economics

Diagram illustrating Karl Marx's theory of value, which posits a dual nature to commodities. Concrete labor creates their use value (material wealth), while abstract labor creates their exchange value, a social form of wealth appearing as money and prices. Competition between independent, private producers—a historically specific condition of capitalism—enforces the standard of socially necessary labor time, reducing human activity to value-producing labor.

The labor theory of value (LTV) posits that the economic value of a good or service is determined by the total amount of socially necessary labor required to produce it. The theory is usually associated with Marxism, although versions of it were originally used by classical economists like Adam Smith and David Ricardo to explain the long-run "natural price" of commodities. For Karl Marx, the LTV was not primarily a theory of relative prices but a tool to explain the social dynamics of capitalism.

Smith argued that a commodity's value was determined by the amount of labor it could command in exchange, while also suggesting that in primitive societies it was regulated by the labor embodied in its production. Ricardo developed a more consistent theory based solely on the quantity of labor embodied in a commodity. Marx built upon and radically transformed the classical theory, making it the cornerstone of his critique of political economy. He argued that value is a social relation specific to commodity-producing societies, with its substance being abstract labor—undifferentiated human labor whose magnitude is determined by the average socially necessary labor time required for production under normal conditions.

The development of the LTV from the late 17th century reflected the rise of capitalism and the increasing focus on the sphere of production rather than exchange. Classical economists used the theory to analyze the distribution of the social product between different classes in the form of wages, profit, and rent. Marx extended this analysis to develop his theory of surplus value, which holds that profit originates from the exploitation of workers, whose unpaid labor is appropriated by capitalists. The theory also underpins his concept of commodity fetishism, whereby the social relations of production are obscured and appear as objective, natural relations between things.

From the late 19th century, the LTV was largely supplanted in mainstream neoclassical economics by the theory of marginal utility. It has faced persistent critiques, notably from the Austrian School and neo-Ricardian economics, which focus on the "transformation problem" of reconciling values with prices. The LTV continues to be a foundation of Marxian economics, with modern debates often centering on whether it should be understood as a direct theory of price determination or as a framework for understanding the contradictory social form of labor under capitalism. Different schools of thought, such as value-form theory, offer varying interpretations of its purpose and validity.

== Definition and variations ==
The main purpose of value theory for classical economists was to explain the "power of purchasing other goods" that a commodity normally conferred on its owner. The "normal" or "natural" price of a commodity, established in the long run under competitive conditions, was considered the monetary expression of its value. The labor theory of value posits that this value is determined by labor. The first version of the theory, associated with Adam Smith, suggests value is determined by the amount of labor a commodity can command in exchange. The second version, developed by David Ricardo, argues that value is determined by the quantity of labor embodied in the production of the commodity. In Karl Marx's formulation, the value of a commodity is not determined by the actual amount of labor an individual worker puts into it, but by the socially necessary labor time—the average time required to produce the commodity under normal technical conditions and with the average degree of skill and intensity of labor prevalent at the time.

Marx's theory rests on two core postulates: first, that living human labor is the sole source of all new value, and second, that value exists as a definite quantitative magnitude that limits prices, profits, and wages at the level of the whole economy. He argued that value is a social relation, not a natural property of a good, and that it exists only in societies where production is oriented towards exchange in a market. The substance of this value is abstract labor, or undifferentiated human labor in general, which is distinct from the specific, concrete labor that produces the commodity's usefulness, or use value. This abstraction is not simply a mental generalization but a "real abstraction" that occurs as a practical social process at the heart of commodity exchange, where different concrete labors are rendered equivalent. Marx saw this "dual character of labour" as the "central element" of his theory of value, reflecting the difference between the material-technical process of production and its specific social form under capitalism.

Some interpretations, often termed "Ricardian Marxism", view Marx's theory as an extension of Ricardo's, with labor seen as a transhistorical principle that constitutes the social world and is the source of all wealth. In this "traditional" view, which is also called the "substance" or "embodied-labor" approach, Marx's critique is aimed at the market-mediated mode of distribution under capitalism that obscures the "true" source of wealth and allows for exploitation. In contrast, the value-form approach, which gained prominence in the 1970s, differentiates the traditional "labour theory of value" from what Diane Elson calls Marx's "value theory of labour", arguing that the object of the theory is not price determination but an analysis of the contradictory forms of labor itself. This school highlights Marx's distinction between value and material wealth: value is a historically specific form of social wealth unique to capitalism, measured by labor time, while material wealth is transhistorical and its creation becomes increasingly dependent on science and technology, not just direct labor time. This growing divergence is central to his analysis of capitalism's inherent contradictions. Labor in capitalism is a unique social practice that acts as a mediation, constituting a new, impersonal, and objective form of social domination. The object of Marx's critique is thus this form of labor itself, and its overcoming would mean the abolition, not the full realization, of labor as the central organizing principle of society.

== Historical development ==
While the labor theory of value is most closely associated with the classical economists, its intellectual antecedents can be traced to earlier economic thought. These early theories reflected the prevailing economic systems and evolved as commodity production became more widespread.

=== Ancient Greek thought ===
The intellectual origins of value theory can be traced to Ancient Greece. Plato, in his Republic, described the origin of a city as a natural consequence of the division of labor. Because individuals are not self-sufficient, they specialize in producing one thing, which necessitates a system of exchange, a market, and money as a measure of value. Aristotle built on this, distinguishing between "value in use" and "value in exchange". He argued that for an exchange to be just, the goods being traded must be equal in some way. He located this common element not in labor, but in human need or demand (chreia), which makes different goods commensurable. This established a tradition, later influential on scholastic and neoclassical thought, where value originates from the subjective utility or usefulness of a good to its consumer.

=== Scholastic and Islamic thought ===
The scholastic doctors of the Middle Ages, such as Thomas Aquinas, largely continued the Aristotelian tradition. They were concerned with the ethical problem of the "just price" (iustum pretium). This was generally conceived as the prevailing market price under competitive conditions, but it also carried a normative dimension: it should be sufficient to cover the producer's costs—including the labor and skill involved—and allow them to maintain their station in life. This represents a cost-of-production theory of price, not a labor theory of value, as labor was not considered the sole determinant of value.

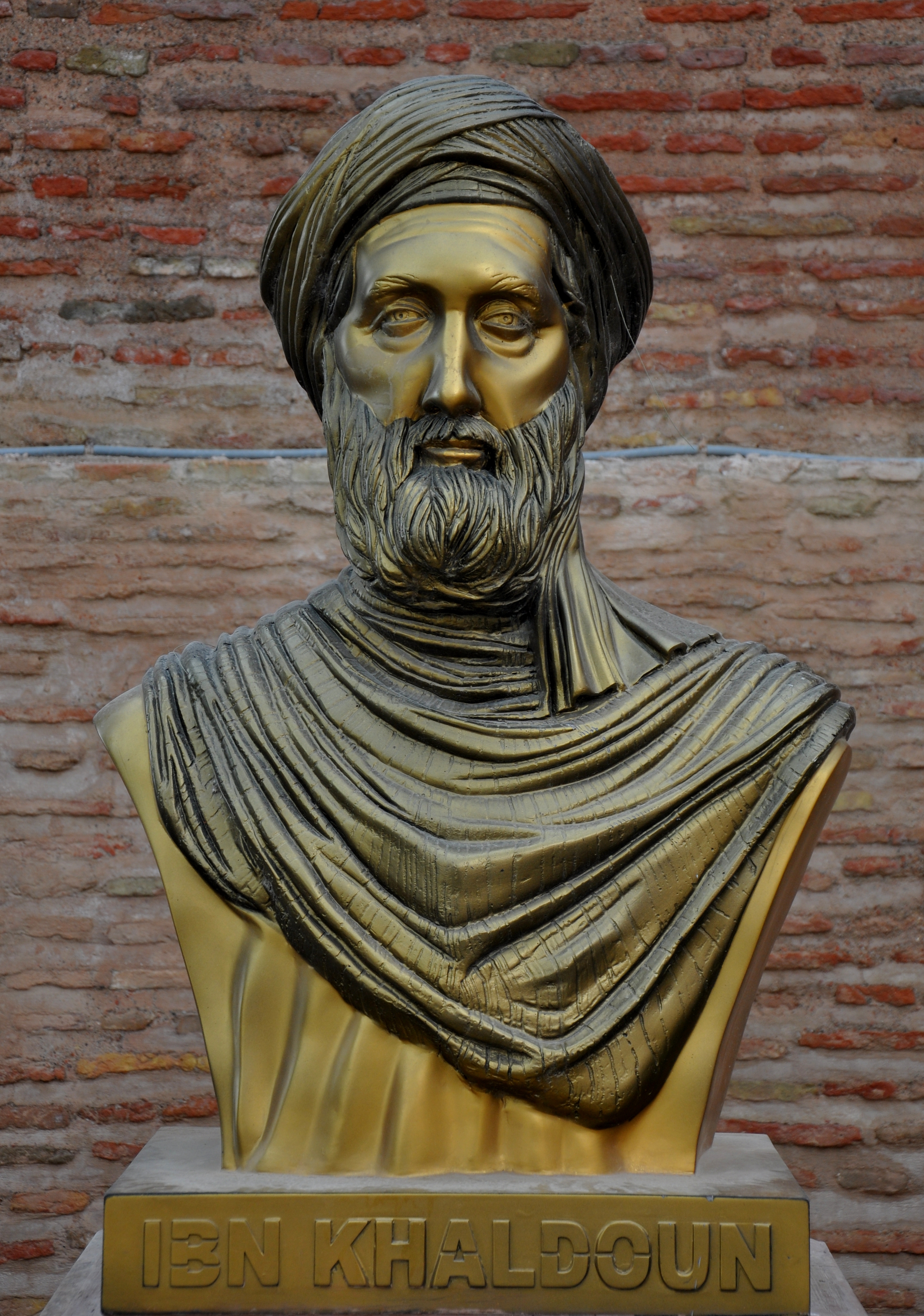
Ibn Khaldun

The 14th-century Arab historian and philosopher Ibn Khaldun has been identified as a significant early proponent of a labor theory of value. In his Muqaddimah, Khaldun argued that "profit is the value realized from human labour" and that labor is the source of all value and capital accumulation. He differentiated between the necessary labor required for a producer's own livelihood and the surplus labor that, when combined through the social division of labour, generates profits and allows for the accumulation of capital. Khaldun also articulated a sophisticated understanding of how prices could deviate from a commodity's labor-value due to the forces of supply and demand in the market.

The existence of Khaldun's theory has been interpreted as a challenge to Marx's argument in Capital, based on his analysis of Aristotle, that a labor theory of value could not have emerged in a pre-capitalist society due to the lack of a generalized concept of human equality. Scholars Şahan Savaş Karataşli and Derek Clark contend that Khaldun was able to formulate his theory because, unlike Aristotle, he held a belief in the fundamental equality of human beings and their labor. Khaldun advanced a form of racial constructivism, arguing that perceived differences between human groups were not biological but were the result of environmental, historical, and political-economic factors. They also contend that the material conditions for such a theory were present, as 14th-century North Africa was already being integrated as a periphery into an emerging Italian-centered capitalist world-economy.

=== Mercantilism and the rise of production theories ===
With the expansion of commerce, the Mercantilist school shifted the focus from production to exchange. Mercantilist writers tended to identify a commodity's value with its market price, which they saw as determined by the forces of supply and demand. Writers like Nicholas Barbon in his A Discourse of Trade (1690) articulated this view, stating that "The Price of Wares is the present Value... The Market is the best Judge of Value". Barbon also emphasized utility as the source of value: "The Value of all Wares arise from their Use; Things of no Use, have no Value". This perspective reflected the concerns of merchants, whose profits were largely dependent on market fluctuations and "profit upon alienation"—buying cheap and selling dear.

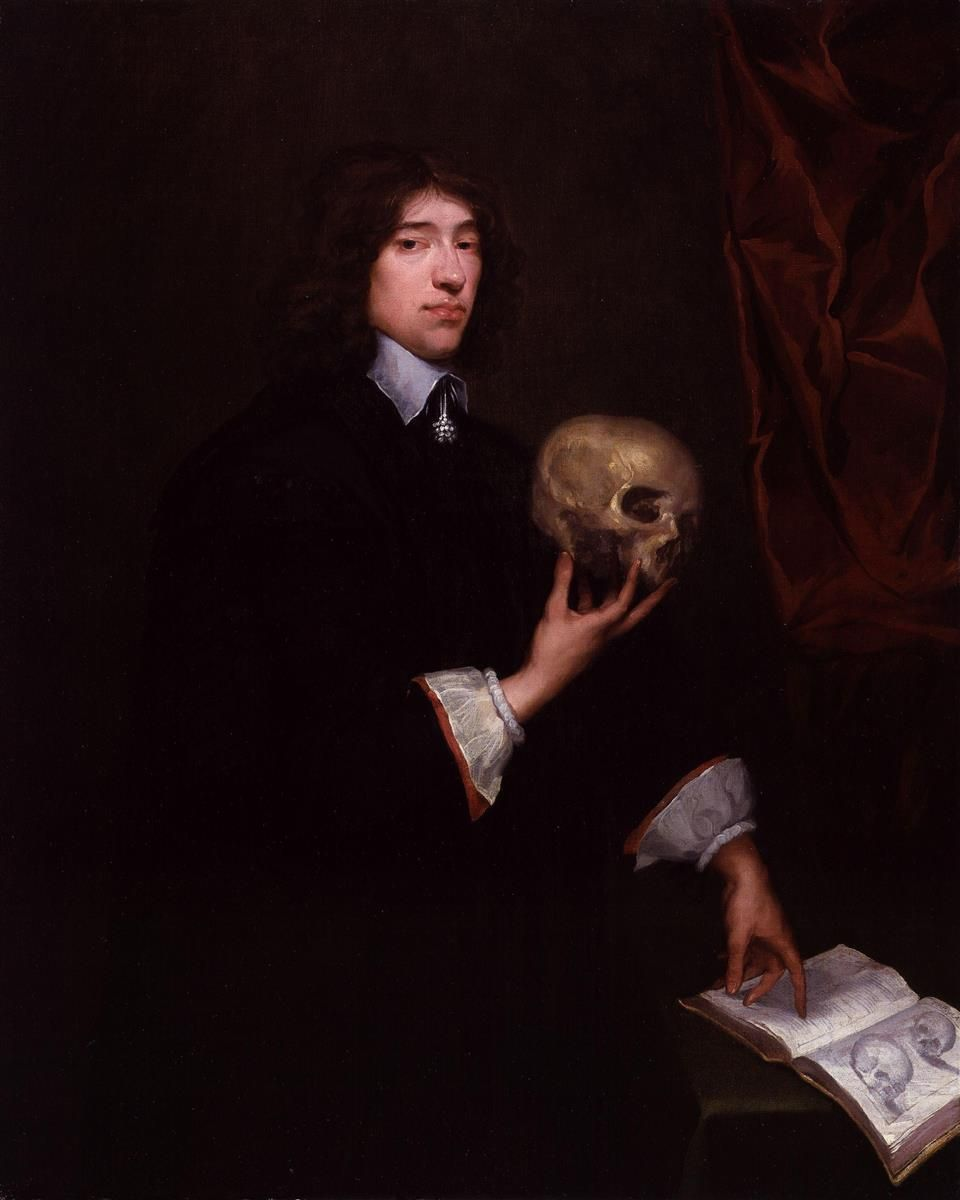
William Petty

The Aristotelian tradition was broken in British economic thought by Thomas Hobbes, who in Leviathan (1651) traced all commodities back to a state of nature in which material things were originally free gifts of God that cost labor only the trouble of gathering them. William Petty was a key transitional figure who developed Hobbes's idea into a more concrete theory, arguing that value originated not from utility but from production, declaring that "Labour is the Father and active principle of Wealth, as Lands are the Mother." He came remarkably close to the idea that exchange value is determined by the labor time required for production, stating: "If a man can bring to London an ounce of Silver out of the Earth in Peru, in the same time that he can produce a bushel of Corn, then one is the natural price of the other". Petty also introduced the concept of capital goods as the "effect of the former or past labour," a notion that would become central to later labor theories by eliminating capital as an independent source of value.

John Locke, in his Two Treatises of Government (1689), used a production theory of value to ground his labor theory of property. He argued that while land and materials are gifts of nature, it is labor that "puts the difference of value on everything." By tracing all the labor required to produce a loaf of bread—from the miners who extracted the iron for the plow to the sailors who transported the millstone—Locke concluded that 99/100ths of the value of products is due to "past labor." However, Locke distinguished this "intrinsic value" (originating from labor and usefulness) from "marketable value," which he saw as regulated by supply and demand. The concept of social labor as the determinant of value grew alongside the idea of the social division of labor, with writers like Bernard Mandeville and Benjamin Franklin arguing that commerce was essentially an exchange of labor for labor. The author of an anonymous 1738 pamphlet, Some Thoughts on the Interest of Money in General, provided a clear statement anticipating Smith: in early societies, the only rule for exchange was "the Quantity of Labour severally imployed in producing them".

=== Adam Smith ===
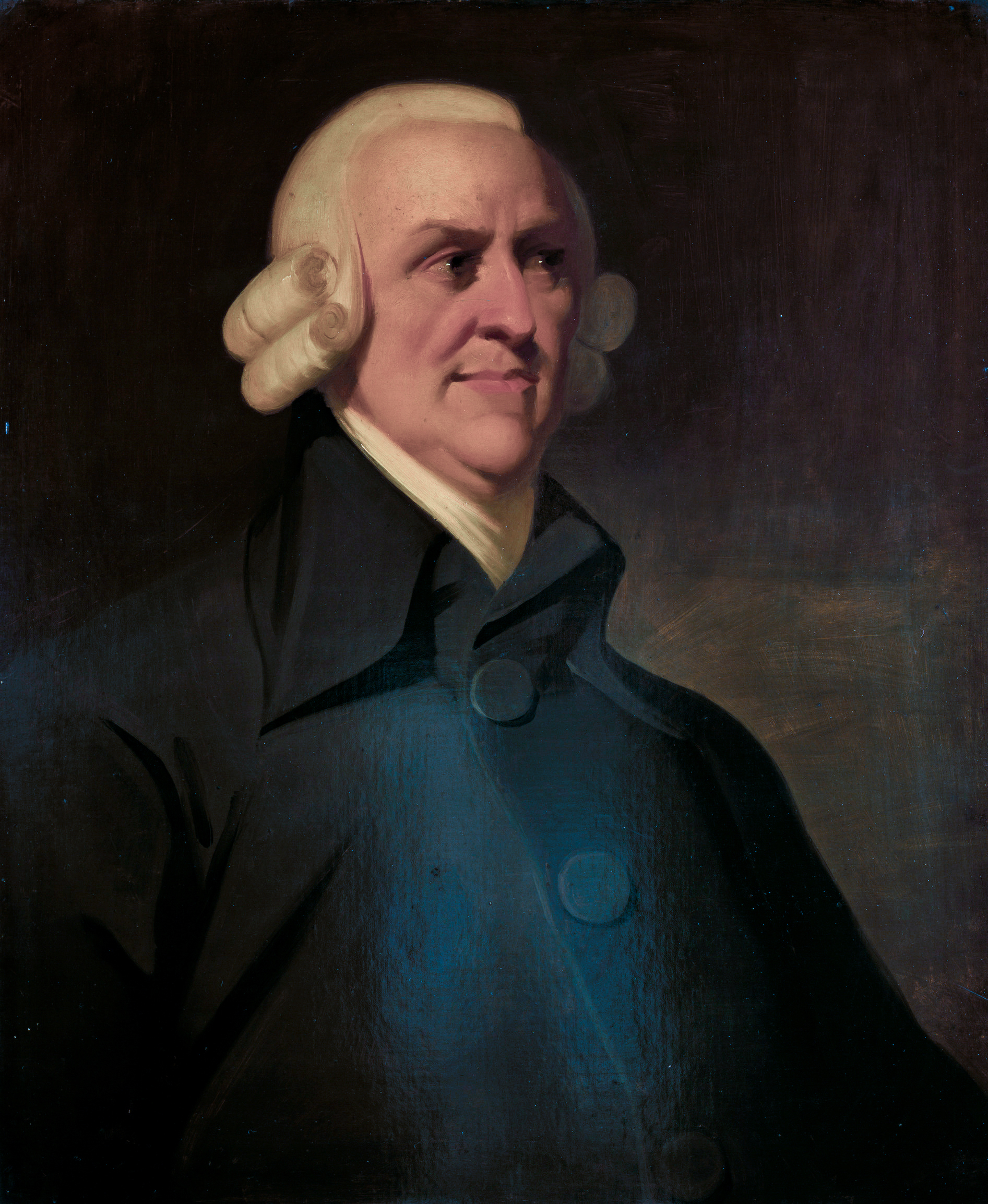
Adam Smith

Adam Smith, in The Wealth of Nations (1776), began with the assertion that "The annual labour of every nation is the fund which originally supplies it with all the necessaries and conveniencies of life." This established labor as the philosophical foundation and origin of value for classical economics, dropping land as a co-equal source as his predecessors Petty and Richard Cantillon had maintained. Smith's analysis, however, contains a tension between two different, and often contradictory, concepts of how labor determines value. His approach stemmed from his analysis of the division of labor in a "commercial society," where "every man thus lives by exchanging, or becomes in some measure a merchant." Smith's economic theory was an extension of his moral philosophy, articulated in The Theory of Moral Sentiments (1759), in which the "invisible hand" of the market acts as the objective mechanism that reconciles individual self-interest with the social good.

==== "Labor commanded" as the real measure of value ====
Smith's primary theory posits that the value of a commodity is measured by the quantity of labor it can command in exchange. He wrote: "The value of any commodity, therefore, to the person who possesses it...is equal to the quantity of labour which it enables him to purchase or command. Labour, therefore, is the real measure of the exchangeable value of all commodities." For Smith, labor was an invariable measure because the "toil and trouble" of labor—the sacrifice of "ease, liberty, and happiness"—remains constant. Smith's purpose in distinguishing this "real price" (in labor sacrifice) from the "nominal price" (in money) was to create a measure for comparing the wealth of nations over time. While the quantity of goods a given amount of labor can buy may vary, the value of the labor itself, from the perspective of the laborer, does not.

This "labor commanded" concept was intended as a universal measure of value applicable to all societies. However, much confusion arose from Smith's "switching his subject" from the perspective of the laborer acquiring a commodity to that of the commodity owner commanding the labor of others. For the commodity owner, the value of labor is not constant, which undermines the raison d'être of the measure.

==== "Labor embodied" as the regulator of value ====
Smith also proposed a second theory, stating that the value of a commodity is regulated by the quantity of labor embodied in its production. However, he argued that this principle only applies in "that early and rude state of society which precedes both the accumulation of stock and the appropriation of land." In such a society of independent producers, where the "whole produce of labour belongs to the labourer," the quantity of embodied labor would tend to equal the quantity of commandable labor.

In a more advanced capitalist society, Smith argued, the "natural price" of a commodity must also cover profit on capital and rent of land. Therefore, the price no longer corresponds solely to the labor embodied in the commodity. The commodity's price resolves into three components—wages, profit, and rent—which Smith called "the three original sources ... of all exchangeable value." This became known as his "adding-up" or cost-of-production theory of value, which stands in contradiction to his labor-embodied theory. Some scholars suggest that Smith's apparent contradictions can be understood through his "representational framework," in which value and its component parts (wages, profit, rent) are seen as mutually determining each other simultaneously, like mirror images, rather than one being the unidirectional cause of the other.

=== David Ricardo ===
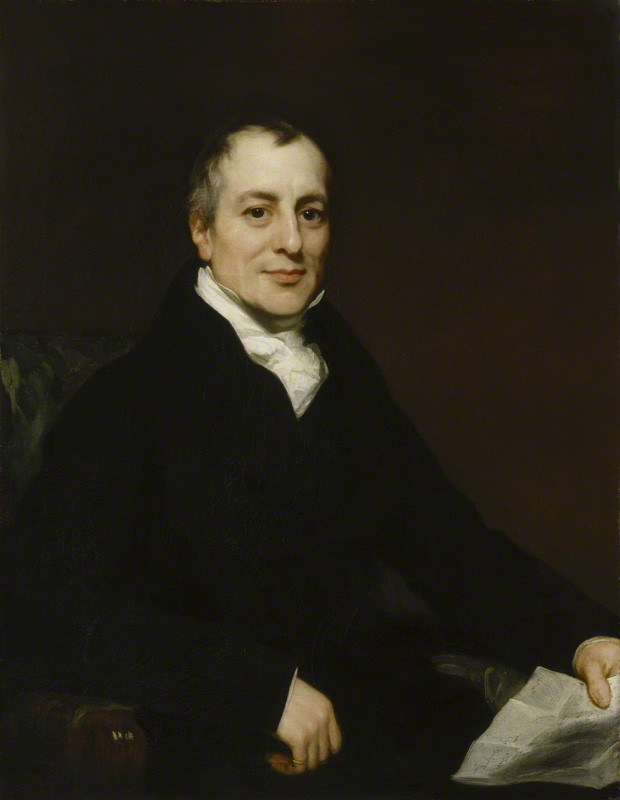
David Ricardo

David Ricardo, in his On the Principles of Political Economy and Taxation (1817), sought to resolve the inconsistencies in Smith's theory. Ricardo firmly established the quantity of embodied labor as the foundation of exchange value in all stages of society, not just in a primitive one. He stated unequivocally:

The value of a commodity, or the quantity of any other commodity for which it will exchange, depends on the relative quantity of labour which is necessary for its production, and not on the greater or less compensation which is paid for that labour.

Ricardo criticized Smith's "labor commanded" measure, arguing that it was no more invariable than the commodities it was supposed to measure. The value of labor itself, he contended, varies with the price of food and other necessaries. Unlike Smith, who tended to view capitalism as a "natural" order, Ricardo's analysis revealed the inherent class antagonisms of the system, particularly the inverse relationship between wages and profit.

==== Modifications to the theory ====
Ricardo recognized that his principle was not absolute and required "considerable modification." His primary focus became the search for the causes of changes in relative value. The main problem he grappled with was the effect of capital on relative prices. He demonstrated that a rise in wages would not cause all prices to rise, as Smith had thought. Instead, it would alter the relative prices of commodities produced with different proportions of fixed and circulating capital, or with capitals of different durability. For example, a rise in wages would lower the price of a commodity produced with a high proportion of durable machinery relative to a commodity produced mainly with direct labor. This was because the rise in wages would cause a fall in the general rate of profit, which would have a greater impact on the price of the more capital-intensive good. This issue, which exposed a contradiction between an embodied-labor theory of value and a cost-summation account of price, later became known as the transformation problem.

In his later work, Ricardo became increasingly concerned with finding an "invariable measure of value" to distinguish changes in a commodity's value caused by changes in its own production process from those caused by changes in the production of the money commodity. This search led him to develop the concept of "absolute value," which he tended to identify with the quantity of embodied labor. He viewed the effect of distribution changes (i.e., a rise in wages and fall in profit) on relative prices not as a separate "real" cause of value, but as an "apparent" cause resulting from the lack of a perfect, invariable measure. For Ricardo, the labor theory of value was ultimately not as central to his system as it would later be for Marx.

=== Karl Marx ===
Karl Marx

Karl Marx adopted and radically developed the labor theory of value, making it the cornerstone of his critique of political economy. For Marx, the LTV was not merely a theory of relative prices but a tool to uncover the social relations of production underlying the capitalist economy. His purpose was to expose the "hidden nexus" that exists between individual producers and to discover the "economic law of motion" of the capitalist mode of production. He argued that "the mode of exchange of products depends upon the mode of exchange of the productive forces," and the labor theory of value was the key to understanding how this occurred. While his analysis of capitalist dynamics was primarily functional, his value theory was essentialist, seeking to uncover the "inner essence" of price relations.

Unlike the classical economists who treated capitalist relations as natural and eternal, Marx, influenced by precursors like Richard Jones, emphasized the historically specific character of economic categories like value, money, and capital. Marx did not see his work as a continuation of classical political economy, but as a critique of it. He criticized Ricardo, for instance, for positing an undifferentiated, transhistorical concept of labor and failing to examine the historically specific form of labor that creates value.

==== Value, abstract labor, and fetishism ====
In the first chapter of Capital (1867), Marx begins his analysis with the commodity, which he identifies as the "simplest social form in which the product of labour presents itself in contemporary society". He makes a crucial distinction between "use value", the utility of a commodity, and "exchange value", the proportion in which it exchanges for other commodities. He argues that for commodities to be exchangeable, they must possess a common substance. This substance cannot be any physical property, since that relates to use value. By abstracting from their use values, the only property commodities have in common is that they are products of labor.

This is not the concrete, useful labor that creates specific use values (e.g., tailoring, weaving), but abstract labor—undifferentiated human labor in general, which is the substance of value. The "equalisation of all types of labour through market equalisation of all the products of labour as values," argued the Marxist economist Isaak Rubin, is what Marx meant by abstract labor; it is a "social and historical concept," not a physiological one. In this view, abstract labor is not just a mental generalization but a real social practice that acts as a unique form of social mediation in capitalist society, replacing the direct social relations (of kinship, dominance, etc.) that characterize other societies. The magnitude of this value is determined by the "socially necessary labor time", the average time required for production.

Because value appears only in the exchange of products, the underlying social relations between producers are disguised. Labor appears not as a direct social relation between individuals but as a "material relation between persons and a social relation between things." Marx called this phenomenon the "fetishism of commodities", where the economic categories of bourgeois society seem to be natural properties of things rather than expressions of a specific, historical mode of production. According to some interpretations, this means that the abstract social structures of capitalism (like value and capital) are not simply a veil for "real" class relations, but are the real, fundamental, albeit alienated, relations of that society, which possess a quasi-objective character. Marx's critique of this "fetishism" was central to his argument that his value theory was not metaphysical, but anti-metaphysical, as it aimed to unmask the social character of what appeared to be natural or objective properties.

==== Surplus value and prices of production ====
Diagram illustrating Marx's theory of surplus value

Marx applied the LTV to explain the origin of profit. He argued that under capitalism, the worker's capacity to labor—their "labor power"—becomes a commodity. Its value, like that of any other commodity, is determined by the labor-time necessary for its reproduction (i.e., the value of the subsistence goods required to maintain the worker). However, the use value of labor-power is that it can create new value. The capitalist buys labor-power at its value but is able to make the worker labor for longer than is necessary to reproduce that value. The value created during this extra, unpaid labor time is "surplus value", which is the source of profit, rent, and interest. This explanation of exploitation does not rely on cheating or unequal exchange; it occurs even when all commodities, including labor-power, are bought and sold at their values. According to Marx, the sale of labor-power, and the resulting alienation of the worker's own life-activity, is the key to understanding the dehumanization inherent in capitalism.

In Volume III of Capital (1894), Marx addressed the issue that Ricardo had struggled with: the divergence of prices from values in developed capitalism. He showed that due to competition between capitals, commodities do not sell at their individual values but at "prices of production", which are equal to their cost-price (cost of materials and wages) plus the average rate of profit on the total capital advanced. This means that capital-intensive industries will receive more profit than the surplus value they produce, while labor-intensive industries will receive less. Marx argued that this did not invalidate the law of value. Instead, prices of production were simply a "transformed form" of values. The total surplus value produced in the economy determines the total profit, which is then redistributed among capitalists according to the size of their capital. Thus, on the level of the economy as a whole, the sum of prices of production equals the sum of values, and the sum of profits equals the sum of surplus value. Some modern interpretations reframe the transformation not as a problem of converting values to prices, but as a theoretical shift between two levels of analysis: from "production in itself" (Volume I) to the "complex unity of production and circulation" (Volume III). From this perspective, the transformation problem is central to understanding the articulated structure of the capitalist economy, rather than a mere technical puzzle.

== Critique and later developments ==
=== Marginal Revolution and its critique ===
Beginning in the 1870s, the "Marginal Revolution", led by economists like William Stanley Jevons, Carl Menger, and Léon Walras, offered a new approach to value theory that largely supplanted the classical labor theory in mainstream economics. This new subjective theory of value located value not in the objective conditions of production but in the subjective utility that consumers derive from a good. The value of a good was determined by its "marginal utility", or the satisfaction gained from consuming one additional unit.

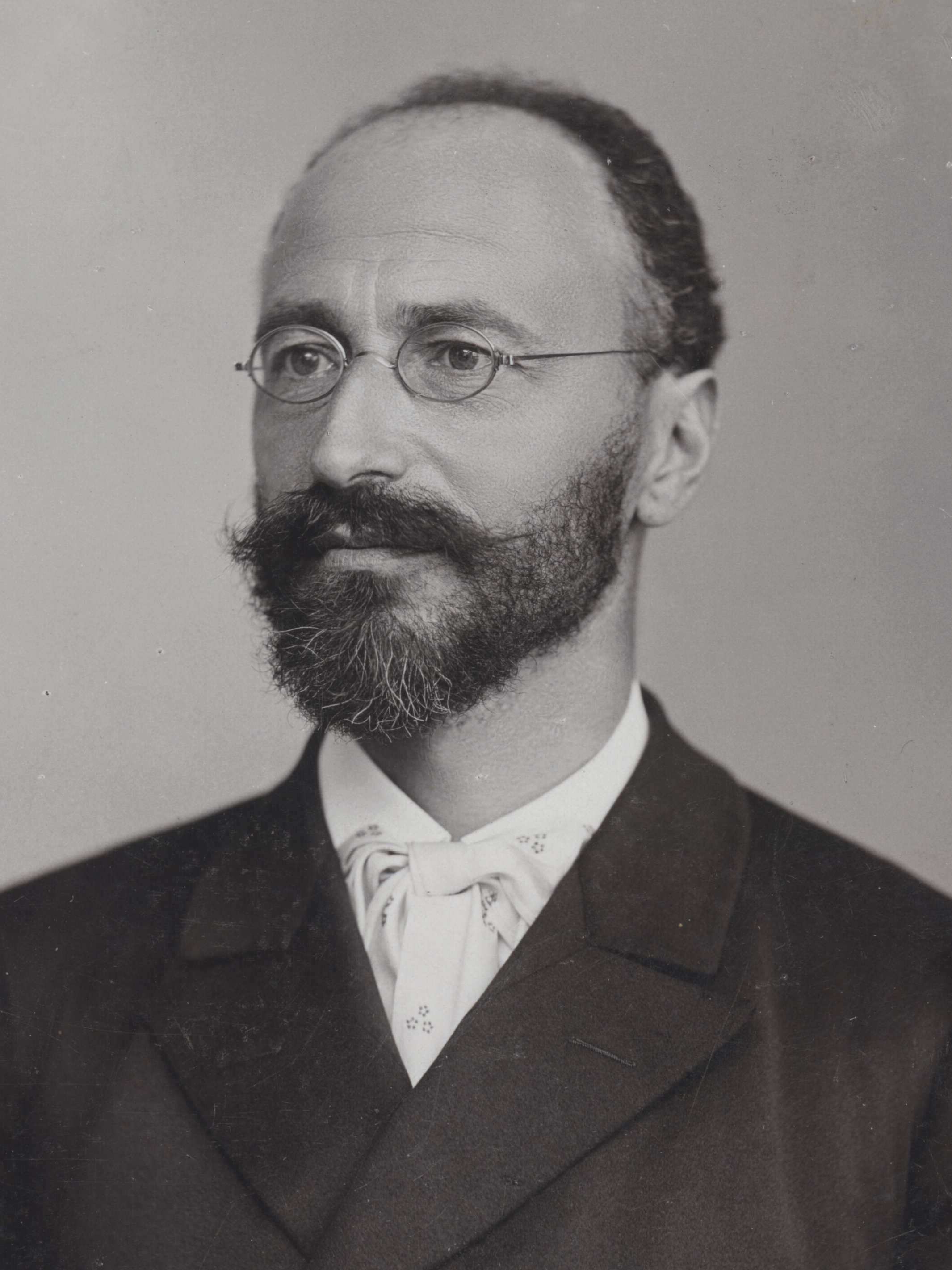
Eugen von Böhm-Bawerk, a leading figure of the Austrian School and an influential critic of Marx's labor theory of value

Thinkers of the Austrian School, such as Eugen von Böhm-Bawerk, were prominent critics of Marx's theory. Böhm-Bawerk attacked what he saw as a contradiction between Marx's value theory in Volume I of Capital (where commodities exchange at their values) and his price theory in Volume III (where they exchange at prices of production). He argued that Marx had failed to logically transform the values of the input commodities into prices of production and that the theory was therefore internally inconsistent. He also critiqued Marx's starting point, arguing that in deducing labor as the common element of value, Marx had illegitimately narrowed his analysis to only "products of labor" (excluding natural resources) and arbitrarily dismissed "general usefulness" (utility) as a possible common element. Other critics, such as Vilfredo Pareto, argued that Marx's theory was a "pure abstraction" that ignored the role of supply and demand.

Early Marxists responded that the marginalist approach was itself a flawed abstraction, and that Böhm-Bawerk's critique was based on a misunderstanding of Marx's dialectical method, which he misread as a "purely logical proof". They argued that the different treatment of labor and use-value was not a logical error but a reflection of their different real natures in a capitalist economy: labor can be generalized into "abstract labor" whose form of existence is money, whereas utility has no such general, real existence apart from the specific use-values of commodities. Conrad Schmidt argued that the subjective theory was circular, as it presupposed the existence of market prices to explain how individuals allocate their income based on marginal utility, while also claiming that those same subjective decisions determine prices. Isaak Rubin later characterized the Austrian school as a theory based on the individualistic psychology of the consumer ("Robinson Crusoes") which corresponded to the "ideology of the bourgeoisie in the epoch of capitalism’s decline" and served as an "acute theoretical weapon for the struggle against Marxism".

=== 20th-century perspectives ===
In the 20th century, Marxist and non-Marxist economists continued to debate the theory. Revisionists like Eduard Bernstein argued that the LTV was a "pure abstract concept" and that the fact of surplus labor was an empirical observation that did not require a deductive value theory to prove it. Other critics, such as A. D. Lindsay and Benedetto Croce, reinterpreted the theory not as an explanation of market prices but as a theory of "natural right" or an ideal "term of comparison" to critique capitalist society. Economists like Oskar R. Lange and Rudolf Schlesinger argued that the essential insights of Marx's analysis of capitalist development could be retained without the labor theory of value, which they saw as a "static theory of general economic equilibrium" that was not necessary for his dynamic analysis. Joan Robinson dismissed the LTV as "metaphysics" and argued that the key concepts of Marxism could be expressed more effectively without it. Leszek Kołakowski characterized Marx's theory of value as a "philosophic anthropology" or "social metaphysics" rather than an economic hypothesis that meets the normal requirements of scientific falsifiability. The theory, in this view, is a "metaphysical" hunt for the "substance" of value, a hidden quality that purports to explain empirical phenomena but which itself cannot be verified.

The "second phase" of the value controversy emerged in the 1960s and 1970s, leading to a split between different schools of Marxian thought.

- The "neo-Ricardian" school, following the work of Piero Sraffa, developed a powerful critique of Marx's LTV. Sraffa's system determines relative prices from physical input-output data without reference to value, rendering the concept redundant. According to neo-Ricardians, the calculation of prices directly from physical technical coefficients is the primary analysis, and deriving values first is an unnecessary "detour". Ian Steedman, a prominent neo-Ricardian, argued that Marx's value analysis was not only redundant but logically inconsistent, particularly in its inability to handle complexities like joint production, where it could lead to the anomaly of negative surplus-value coexisting with positive profits. Proponents of this view hold that the redundancy of value is a consequence of "simultaneous valuation"—valuing inputs and outputs at the same set of prices—which makes prices and the rate of profit dependent only on physical quantities, not labor-time.

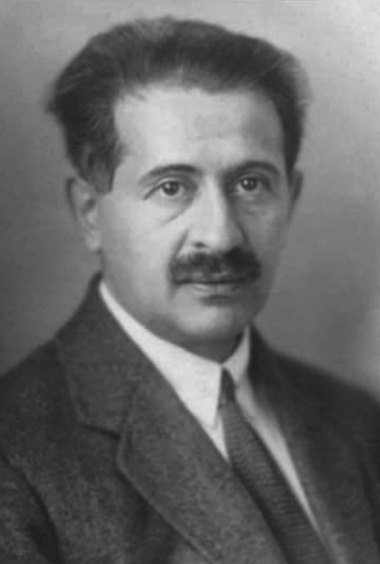
Isaak Rubin, a key figure in the value-form school which emphasizes the LTV's focus on value as a social form, rather than as an embodied substance

- The "value-form" school responded by shifting the focus from the magnitude of value to its form. They re-emphasized Marx's analysis of commodity fetishism and argued that the LTV is fundamentally a critique of the social forms of capitalism, not a theory of price. This approach, which developed in the 1970s as a reaction to both the Sraffian critique and what were seen as overly simplistic interpretations of Marx, was prefigured in the early 20th century by the work of Marxists such as Rubin. Theorists in this camp argued that the Sraffian critique applies to Ricardo's concept of embodied labor, but not to Marx's distinct theory of abstract labor and the value-form. They see the "anomalies" not as flaws in Marx's theory but as expressions of the "real contradictions of capitalist society." An influential branch of this school is the German "New Reading of Marx" (Neue Marx-Lektüre), which developed from the Frankfurt School tradition. It interprets Marx's project not as an alternative economic theory but as a "critique of political economy as a critical theory of society". This approach emphasizes that value is inseparable from its monetary form and is constituted through a "real abstraction" rooted in the social practice of commodity exchange. Moishe Postone, a prominent value-form theorist, argued that Marx's critique is aimed at the character of labor itself in capitalism and the abstract, impersonal form of domination it generates. This provides a critique of "actually existing socialism" as well as traditional capitalism, as both can be based on this same form of social mediation by labor.
- The "fundamentalist" school sought to defend both the form and the magnitude aspects of Marx's theory. Thinkers like Paul Sweezy argued that value theory is indispensable because key concepts, such as the rate of surplus-value, "disappear, vanish without a trace, from an analysis made in terms of prices." Anwar Shaikh, and proponents of the Temporal Single-System Interpretation (TSSI) like Andrew Kliman, developed "temporal" approaches to the transformation problem. They argued that the alleged inconsistencies arose from the static, equilibrium-based "simultaneous" valuation methods used by critics, which were alien to Marx's own dynamic, conflict-driven method. The TSSI holds that by determining input and output prices sequentially (temporally) within a single system, the apparent contradictions in Marx's theory disappear. According to this interpretation, all of Marx's aggregate equalities (total price equals total value, etc.) are preserved, and his theory is shown to be logically consistent.
- The "macro-monetary" interpretation, advanced by Fred Moseley, also argues for the logical consistency of Marx's theory by rejecting the standard "dual-system" reading. This school posits that Marx's analysis is a "single-system" theory whose logical framework is the circuit of money capital (M–C...M'). In this view, the initial "givens" are not physical quantities but the actual quantities of money capital advanced at the start of the circuit. The components of this capital—constant and variable capital—are therefore also given monetary magnitudes. The transformation problem is resolved because these same given monetary quantities are used in both the value analysis (Volume I) and the price analysis (Volume III), meaning there is no "transformation of inputs" to be performed and thus no error in Marx's procedure. While sharing the TSSI's emphasis on sequential determination, the macro-monetary interpretation differs by maintaining that prices of production are long-run equilibrium centers of gravity, not a series of short-run prices.

=== Exploitation and the LTV ===
A key purpose of the labor theory of value within Marxism is to explain exploitation. However, the precise relationship between the two has been a subject of considerable debate. Traditional interpretations hold that the LTV is indispensable for the theory of exploitation. The argument proceeds from the premise that "Labour and labour alone creates value." Since the worker receives in wages only the value of their labor-power, which is less than the total value they create in a working day, the capitalist is able to appropriate the remaining "surplus-value." This appropriation of value created by the worker is defined as exploitation. However, thinkers like Leszek Kołakowski argue that the concept of exploitation can be defined without recourse to the LTV. Exploitation, in this view, consists not in the appropriation of unpaid labor per se, but in the fact that society has no control over the use of the surplus product, with its distribution being decided exclusively by the owners of the means of production. It is thus a political question of control rather than a purely economic one.

Analytical Marxists such as the philosopher G.A. Cohen argued for a "mutual irrelevance" between the two concepts. Cohen contended that the traditional argument is flawed because its key premise—that labor creates value—is not a consequence of the strict labor theory of value (that socially necessary labor time determines the magnitude of value). He argues that if the LTV is true, then value is determined by the labor time currently required for production, not by the labor actually expended in the past. Therefore, he concludes, "if the labour theory of value is true, labour does not create value." Cohen argues that the real basis for the charge of exploitation is not that workers create value, but the simpler and "fairly obvious truth" that workers create the product—that which has value. The exploitative nature of capitalism, in this view, lies in the fact that the capitalist appropriates a portion of the value of what the worker produces, while the capitalist, as a non-producer, contributes nothing to its creation. John Roemer also questioned the necessity of the concept of labor in explaining surplus, arguing that surplus value can be explained in terms of input factors other than labor.

Erik Olin Wright, in response, initially argued that the LTV, and its focus on surplus labor, provides a crucial link between class structure and exploitation that is missing in alternative frameworks. He contended that the LTV allows for a concept of class rooted in the social relations of production (specifically, the appropriation of surplus labor), whereas theories that reject it, like the Sraffian approach, tend to lead to a Weberian "market-class" concept based on relations of domination in the market. Critics of this view, such as Geoff Hodgson, argued that Wright's defense was circular, as it defined class in terms of surplus labor appropriation and then used that definition to justify the analytical primacy of surplus labor. In a later reconsideration, Wright conceded that his initial argument was "overstated" and that a Sraffian framework could also generate a production-based concept of class. The key difference, he concluded, was that a Marxist concept of class is built around exploitation (the appropriation of surplus labor), while a Sraffian-derived concept would be built around domination within production (control over the labor process).

=== Applications under socialism and monopoly capitalism ===
The question of the LTV's relevance to post-capitalist societies has also been a subject of debate. Marx and Friedrich Engels argued that in a socialist society, where commodity production is abolished, the law of value would cease to operate. Social labor would be distributed directly by a plan, and products would not take the form of commodities with exchange value. In the Soviet Union, however, Joseph Stalin argued in Economic Problems of Socialism in the USSR (1951) that because commodity production continued to exist (particularly in the exchange between state industry and collective farms), the law of value still operated, though in a "transformed" and limited way.

In the context of monopoly capitalism, the LTV's explanatory power has been questioned. Under monopoly, prices are no longer determined by competitive conditions but by the firm's ability to restrict output. Marx himself noted that a monopoly price would "transfer a portion of the profit of the other producers of commodities to the commodities with a monopoly price," leaving the total surplus value unchanged. However, as monopoly became the dominant form of market structure, some Marxists, particularly those of the Monthly Review school like Paul A. Baran and Paul Sweezy, argued that the traditional LTV needed to be modified. They developed the concept of an "economic surplus" to analyze a system dominated by large corporations and argued that the central problem was not production but the "absorption" of this rising surplus.

== See also ==
- Entitlement theory
- Ricardian socialism
