= Historical determinism =

Philosophical view that events are entirely determined by history

Historical determinism is the belief that events in history are entirely determined or constrained by various prior forces and, therefore, in a certain sense, inevitable. It is the philosophical view of determinism applied to the process or direction by which history unfolds. Historical determinism places the cause of the event behind it.

The concept of determinism appeared in the 19th century. The main idea is that certain factors determine the existence of humans and therefore limit the scope of their free will. In history, this is an approach that holds that history is intrinsically meaningful. Used as a pejorative, it is normally meant to designate a rigid finalist or mechanist conception of historical unfolding that makes the future appear as an inevitable and predetermined result of the past.

== Relationship to historical materialism ==
Historical determinism has been opposed by historical materialists such as Karl Marx, who have argued that people make their own decisions, even if the decisions are influenced by material conditions.

== See also ==
- Determinism
- Dialectical materialism
- Economic determinism
- Environmental determinism
- Free will
- Geographic determinism
- Hegelianism
- Historical materialism
- Marxism
- Myth of progress
- Technological determinism

== Bibliography ==
- Adcock, Robert (2007). "Who's Afraid of Determinism? The Ambivalence of Macro-Historical Inquiry". Journal of the Philosophy of History. 1 (3): 346–364. doi:10.1163/187226307X229407.
- Banerjee, Abhijit V.; Duflo, Esther (2014). "Under the Thumb of History? Political institutions and the Scope for Action" (PDF). Annual Review of Economics. 6 (1): 951–971. doi:10.1146/annurev-economics-080213-041110. ISSN 1941-1391. S2CID 154623830.
- Brites Pereira, Luis; Luiz, John Manuel (2019). "Institutional drivers, historical determinism, and economic development in Mozambique" (PDF). International Journal of Emerging Markets. 15 (4): 767–789. doi:10.1108/ijoem-01-2019-0024. S2CID 210054631.
- Dray, William H. (1993) [1964]. "Historical Determinism". Philosophy of History. Prentice Hall. pp. 114–140. ISBN 0-13-012816-3. LCCN 92-24133.
- Gurpegui, José Antonio (2018). "Historical Determinism in the 1812 Constitutions of the United States and Spain". Complutense Journal of English Studies. 26: 9–25. doi:10.5209/cjes.62380. ISSN 2386-3935.
- Grünbaum, Adolf (1956). "Historical Determinism, Social Activism, and Predictions in the Social Sciences". British Journal for the Philosophy of Science. 7 (27): 236–240. doi:10.1093/bjps/VII.27.236. ISSN 1464-3537.
- Hook, Sidney (27 January 1955). "Historical Determinism and Political Fiat in Soviet Communism". Proceedings of the American Philosophical Society. 99 (1): 1–10. ISSN 0003-049X. JSTOR 3143687.
- Hunt, Ronald J. (1985). "Marxism's Unseen Hand: Friedrich Engels & the Rise of Historical Determinism". Polity. 18 (2): 340–349. doi:10.2307/3234954. JSTOR 3234954. S2CID 201392052.
- Martin, Ruhr (1995). "Cohen versus Gouldner: historical materialism as a determinism". South African Journal of Sociology. 26 (1): 26–34. doi:10.1080/02580144.1995.10431711.
- Misztal, Barbara; Freundlieb, Dieter (August 2003). "The Curious Historical Determinism of Randall Collins". European Journal of Sociology. 44 (2): 247–269. doi:10.1017/S0003975603001267. S2CID 144914434.
- Nagel, Ernest (March 1960). "Determinism in History". Philosophy and Phenomenological Research. 20 (3): 291–317. doi:10.2307/2105051. ISSN 1933-1592. JSTOR 2105051.
