= Organic composition of capital =

Concept created by Karl Marx

The organic composition of capital (OCC) is a concept developed by Karl Marx in his theory of capital, which was simultaneously his critique of political economy. It is derived from his more basic concepts of 'value composition of capital' and 'technical composition of capital'. Marx defines the organic composition of capital as "the value-composition of capital, in so far as it is determined by its technical composition and mirrors the changes of the latter". The 'technical composition of capital' measures the relation between the elements of constant capital (plant, equipment and materials) and variable capital (wage workers). It is 'technical' because no valuation is here involved. In contrast, the 'value composition of capital' is the ratio between the value of the elements of constant capital involved in production and the value of the labor. Marx found that the special concept of 'organic composition of capital' was sometimes useful in analysis, since it assumes that the relative values of all the elements of capital are constant.

== Overview ==
In Volume I of Capital, Marx made the simplifying assumption that all valuation was in terms of what is often called labor-values (and he called 'values'). In Volume III, however, he states that equilibrium values between industries could not be directly proportional to their labor content. The latter only determined equilibrium values in his pre-capitalist 'Simple Commodity Production', where the producers owned their means of production and natural resources were used freely. In Volume III, first he assumed that land could be used freely and showed that the equilibrium prices were his 'prices of production'. Later, when he introduced land ownership and the rent on land, the equilibrium prices were to be 'modified production prices' that took the rent of land into account. The implication of this is that the valuation used for the 'value composition of capital' had to be accordingly modified, since the labor-values used throughout Volume I was an expedient he used in order to not excessively complicate the communication of this theory. But Marx was not able to complete to his satisfaction Volumes II and III.

The various distinct concepts related to the composition of capital are often used in contemporary Marxian economics as a theoretical alternative to similar neo-classical concepts. The neoclassical concept most similar to the increasing organic composition of capital is capital deepening. Marx's concept of constant capital is the monetary value of the plant, equipment and materials that are tied up in the production process. And his concept of variable capital is the money value that is tied up in the payment of wages. The concept of OCC does not apply to all capital assets, only to those invested in production (i.e. it excludes assets that are in the 'sphere of consumption', such as homes).

In Volume III Marx demonstrates that the organic composition of capital decisively influences industrial profitability. According to him, the OCC expresses the specific form which the capitalist mode of production gives to the relationship between means of production and labor power, determining the productivity of labor and the creation of a surplus product. This relationship has both technical and social aspects, reflecting the fact that simultaneously consumable use values and commercial exchange-values are being produced.

Marx argues that a rising organic composition of capital is a necessary effect of capital accumulation and competition in the sphere of production, at least in the long term. This means that the share of constant capital in the total capital outlay increases, and that labor input per product unit declines.

In his discussion, Marx leaves out of account components of capital other than labour-power and means of production invested in, such as the faux frais of production (incidental expenses). The full importance of the OCC emerges in chapter 8 of Volume III of Das Kapital.

== Ratios ==
The value composition of capital (VCC) is usually expressed as a ratio of constant capital to variable capital, or ${c \over v}$. Other measures are also used in the Marxian literature. One is ${c \over {s+v}}$. This is the ratio of constant capital to newly produced value (roughly, what modern economists call "value added"), i.e., the sum of surplus-value and variable capital, which is close to the concept of a capital/output ratio. Less common is the measure used by Paul M. Sweezy, i.e., ${c \over {c+v}}$, the ratio of constant capital to the total capital invested.

The total capital tied up by a capitalist enterprise includes more than fixed assets, materials and wages/salaries; it also includes liquid funds, reserves and other financial assets. For instance, an employer must normally reserve funds to pay for ongoing operating expenses, until these are recouped from product sales.

== Measures ==
An empirical proxy measure for the technical composition of capital (TCC) is the average amount of fixed equipment and materials used per worker (capital intensity), or the ratio of the average amount of equipment and materials used to the total hours worked. The value composition of capital (VCC) is usually measured by summing the value of fixed capital ("Cf") and intermediate expenditures (circulating capital or "Cc") and dividing the total by the value of labour costs (V). The estimation procedure is not simple, for example because compensation of employees includes more than wages and part of the tax levy constitutes an element of surplus value.

In modern national accounts, an empirical proxy of the flow of variable capital is the wage-payments associated with productive activity in an accounting period, and a proxy for constant capital (flow measure) is depreciation charges + intermediate consumption; a stock measure of constant capital would be the fixed capital stock plus the average value of inventories held during the period of account (usually a year). However, because the "circulating" component of constant capital (denoted "Cc") includes purchases of external services and other operating costs, the stock of Cc is sometimes measured as the flow of intermediate consumption divided by the average inventory level.

The variable capital actually tied up by an enterprise at any point in time will usually be less than the annual flow value, because wages can in part be paid out of revenues received from ongoing product sales. Thus, the capital reserves held by an enterprise for paying wages may, at any time, be only 1/10 or so of their annual flow value.

The most accurate quantitative estimates for the OCC refer to the outlays in specific sectors, e.g. manufacturing.

== Examples ==
By any of these measures, the plant- and machinery-intensive oil industry would have a high organic composition of capital, while labor-intensive businesses such as catering would tend to have a low OCC. The OCC varies according to differences in production technology, between sectors of an economy, or according to changes in production technology over time.

== The OCC and crises ==
The magnitude of the OCC is important in Marxist crisis theory because of its impact on the average rate of profit. The implication of a rise in the organic composition of capital is a declining rate of profit; for every new increase in surplus-value realised as profit from sales, an even larger corresponding increase in constant capital investment becomes necessary.

But this represents only a tendency, Marx argues, because the fall of the rate of profit can be offset by counteracting influences. The main ones include:

- buying constant capital inputs at a lower cost.
- an increase in the rate of exploitation and productivity of labour power (including the intensity of work).
- a reduction of the turnover-time of constant capital inputs.
- the reduction of salaries and labour costs paid.
- a pool of abundant cheap labor, at home or abroad.
- foreign trade which reduces constant capital-input costs.
- technological innovations which reduce constant capital-input costs.
- the specific distribution of surplus-value as profit, interest, rent, taxes and fees, and the division between distributed and undistributed components of the new value added.
- market expansion (more sales, in less time).
- monopolistic or oligopolistic pricing of outputs, or in some way artificially raising output prices.
- reduction of the tax burden
- criminal methods to reduce costs and increase sales and profits

Because numerous different factors can affect profitability, the overall effects of a rising OCC on average industrial profitability therefore really have to be evaluated empirically in a longer time-span, e.g. 20–25 years.

Insofar as the trajectory of capitalist development is, as Marx argues, ruled by the quest for extra surplus-value, the economic fate of the system can be summarised as an interaction between the tendency of the profit rate to decline, and the factors that counteract it: in other words, the permanent battle to reduce costs, increase sales and increase profits.

The hypothetical final result of the rising OCC would be full automation of the production process, in which case labour-costs would be near-zero. This is argued to herald the end of capitalism's functioning as both a profit generating economic system for capitalists, and as a social system, among other things because the capitalist system does not contain a means for distributing incomes other than that based on labour-effort, and full automation would negate the concept of exploitation.

== Marx and Ricardo ==
The different organic compositions of capital of different branches of industry raised a problem for the classical economic schema of David Ricardo and others, who could not reconcile their labor-cost theory of price with the existence of differences in the OCC between sectors. The latter imply different profit rates in different industries. Also, while market competition would establish a ruling price level for a type of output, different enterprises would use more or less labour to produce it. For these reasons, values produced and prices realised by different producers would quantitatively diverge.

Marx either solved this problem with his theory of prices of production and the tendency for profitability differentials to be levelled out through competition, or he failed to solve it, according to which side of the debate over the transformation problem one finds convincing.

Others see this "problem" (the development of a mathematical relationship between prices and labor-values) as a false one, rejecting the idea that Marx aimed to use his labor theory value to understand relative prices. Here the argument is that he aimed to reveal only the social nature or "deep structure" of capitalist society.

In a third interpretation, Marx aspired both to relate values and prices, and offer a social critique, because both of these were necessary to make his case truly convincing. Here, the separate concepts of product-values and product-prices are regarded as essential for a theory of market dynamics and capitalist competition; it is argued that price behaviour in aggregate cannot be understood or theorised about at all without reference to value-relations, explicitly or implicitly.

== Historical trends ==
There has been a lengthy theoretical and statistical dispute among Marxian economists about whether the organic composition of capital really does tend to, or has to rise historically, as Marx predicted, or, to put it differently, whether in aggregate technological progress has a "labor-saving bias", and causes the average profit rate to decline.

One sort of question asked is, why capitalists would introduce new technology, if doing so would result specifically in a lower profit rate on capital invested? Marx's reply is essentially that:

- when a successful new technology or product is first introduced on the market, the pioneering producers typically obtain an additional profit (or superprofit), but when the use of the innovation spreads and is more generally applied, profitability declines for all producers.
- competition between capitalists forces the introduction of new technologies, whether they like it or not, since the productivity gains of competitors threaten to put them out of business, or reduce their market-shares.
- while average profit rates on capital invested may decline as a result, profit margins (or profit volumes) will increase, because more output can be produced and sold in a given accounting period, using the new technologies (implying unit-costs for products made will decline).

The statistical and historical evidence about the Kondratiev waves of capitalist development from the 1830s onwards is certainly favourable to Marx's theory of the rising organic composition of capital. It is difficult to find industries where the secular historical trend is one of an increase in the share of wages in the total capital outlay. Generally, the opposite is the case.

However, it has been argued that the value of physical capital is notoriously difficult to measure empirically in an accurate way; and statistical time-series for economic variables over long periods are also susceptible to errors and distortions. The owners of a business may not even know exactly what the physical assets they use are currently worth, or what their business is currently worth, as a going concern. That worth is hypothetical until such time as the business is sold and paid for. However, the modern trend in official accounting standards is certainly for assets to be valued more and more at their current market value, or current replacement cost, rather than at historic (original acquisition) cost.

In addition, during severe economic slumps, physical capital assets are subject to devaluation, lie idle or are destroyed, while workers become unemployed; the empirical effect is to reduce the organic composition of capital. Likewise, non-profitable war production can also lower the average OCC.

Finally, a technological revolution can also radically change the proportions between constant and variable capital, reducing the cost of constant capital, and lowering the OCC. In that case, operating costs are reduced in a short span of time, or cheaper alternatives substitute for the inputs traditionally used.

Much less discussed in the economic literature is the effect on the organic composition of capital of the growth of the services sector in the developed countries. For example, does the widespread use of computers in labour-intensive services lower the OCC?

== See also ==
- Law of value

== Sources ==
- Karl Marx (1867). "The General Law of Capitalist Accumulation". Das Kapital. Vol. 1.
- Anwar Shaikh; Ahmet Tonak (2010). Measuring the Wealth of Nations. Cambridge University Press.
- Reati, Angelo (1986). "The Rate of Profit and the Organic Composition of Capital in the Post-1945 Long Wave: The Case of British Industry from 1959 to 1981". Review. 9 (4): 515–571. JSTOR 40241039. Wikidata Q141178652.
- Ramin Ramtin (1991). Capitalism and Automation – Revolution in Technology and Capitalist Breakdown. London: Pluto Press.
- Reati, Angelo (1986). "The Rate of Profit and the Organic Composition of Capital in West German Industry from 1960 to 1981". Review of Radical Political Economics. 18 (1–2): 56–86. doi:10.1177/048661348601800104. Wikidata Q141178682.
- Christian Girschner (2003). Die Dienstleistungsgesellschaft. Zur Kritik einer fixen Idee (in German). Köln: PapyRossa Verlag.
