= Tendency of the rate of profit to fall =

Hypothesis in Marxist economics

Rates of profit in six core countries from 1850 to 2010, as charted by Esteban Maito

The tendency of the rate of profit to fall (TRPF) is a theory in the crisis theory of political economy, according to which the average rate of profit—the ratio of the profit to the amount of invested capital—decreases over time. This hypothesis gained additional prominence from its discussion by Karl Marx in Chapter 13 of Capital, Volume III, but economists as diverse as Adam Smith, John Stuart Mill, David Ricardo and William Stanley Jevons referred explicitly to the TRPF as an empirical phenomenon that demanded further theoretical explanation, although they differed on the reasons why the TRPF should necessarily occur. Some scholars, such as David Harvey, argue against the TRPF as a quantitative phenomenon, arguing it is an internal logic driving the movement of capital itself.

Geoffrey Hodgson stated that the theory of the TRPF "has been regarded, by most Marxists, as the backbone of revolutionary Marxism. According to this view, its refutation or removal would lead to reformism in theory and practice". Stephen Cullenberg stated that the TRPF "remains one of the most important and highly debated issues of all of economics" because it raises "the fundamental question of whether, as capitalism grows, this very process of growth will undermine its conditions of existence and thereby engender periodic or secular crises."

== Causal explanations ==
=== Karl Marx ===
In Marx's critique of political economy, the value of a commodity is the median amount of labour that is socially necessary to produce that commodity. Marx argued that technological innovation enabled more efficient means of production. In the short run, physical productivity would increase as a result, allowing the early adopting capitalists to produce greater use values (i.e., physical output). In the long run, if demand remains the same and the more productive methods are adopted across the entire economy, the amount of labour required (as a ratio to capital, i.e. the organic composition of capital) would decrease. Now, assuming value is tied to the amount of labor necessary, the value of the physical output would decrease relative to the value of production capital invested. In response, the average rate of industrial profit would therefore tend to decline in the longer term.

In the “unhindered” advance of capitalist production lurks a threat to capitalism that is much graver than crises. It is the threat of the constant fall of the rate of profit, resulting not from the contradiction between production and exchange, but from the growth of the productivity of labor itself.

— Rosa Luxemburg, in her 1899 pamphlet Social Reform or Revolution?

It declined in the long run, Marx argued, paradoxically not because productivity decreased, but instead because it increased, with the aid of a bigger investment in equipment and materials.

The central idea that Marx had was that overall technological progress has a long-term "labor-saving bias", and that the overall long-term effect of saving labor time in producing commodities with the aid of more and more machinery had to be a falling rate of profit on production capital, quite regardless of market fluctuations or financial constructions.

==== Countertendencies ====
Marx regarded the TRPF as a general tendency in the development of the capitalist mode of production. Marx maintained that it was only a tendency, and that there are also "counteracting factors" operating which had to be studied as well. The counteracting factors were factors that would normally raise the rate of profit. In his draft manuscript edited by Friedrich Engels, Marx cited six of them:

- More intense exploitation of labor (raising the rate of exploitation of workers).
- Reduction of wages below the value of labor power (the immiseration thesis).
- Cheapening the elements of constant capital by various means.
- The growth of a relative surplus population (the reserve army of labor) which remained unemployed.
- Foreign trade reducing the cost of industrial inputs and consumer goods.
- The increase in the use of share capital by joint-stock companies, which devolves part of the costs of using capital in production on others.

Nevertheless, Marx thought the countervailing tendencies ultimately could not prevent the average rate of profit in industries from falling; the tendency was intrinsic to the capitalist mode of production. In the end, none of the conceivable counteracting factors could stem the tendency toward falling profits from production.

=== Capital stock growth ===
In Adam Smith's TRPF theory, the falling tendency results from the growth of capital which is accompanied by increased competition. The growth of capital stock itself would drive down the average rate of profit.

=== Other influences ===
There could also be several other factors involved in profitability which Marx and others did not discuss in detail, including:

- Reductions in the turnover time of industrial capital generally (and especially fixed capital investment).
- Accelerated depreciation and faster throughput.
- The level of price inflation for different types of goods and services.
- Taxes, levies, subsidies and credit policies of governments, interest and rent costs.
- Capital investment into areas of (previously) non-capitalist production, where a lower organic composition of capital prevailed.
- Military wars or military spending causing capital assets to be inoperative or destroyed, or spurring war production (see permanent arms economy).
- Demographic factors.
- Advances in technology and technological revolutions which rapidly reduce input costs.
- Particularly in the era of globalization, the national and international freight rate (shipping, trucking, railfreight, airfreight).
- Substituted natural resource inputs, or marginal increased cost of non-substituted natural resource inputs.
- Consolidation of mature industries into an oligarchy of survivors. Mature industries do not attract new capital because of low returns. Mature companies with large amounts of capital invested and brand recognition can also try to block new competitors in their markets. See also secular stagnation theory.
- The use of credit instruments to reduce capital costs for new production.

The scholarly controversy about the TRPF among Marxists and non-Marxists has continued for a hundred years. There exist nowadays several thousands of academic publications on the TRPF worldwide, both for and against. No available book provides an exposition of all the different arguments that have been made. Professor Michael C. Howard stated that "The connection between profit and economic theory is an intimate one. (...) However, a generally accepted theory of profit has not emerged at any stage in the history of economics... theoretical controversies remain intense."

== Mathematical explanation ==
Marx defines the rate of profit $p^\prime$ as:

$p^\prime = \frac{s}{v + c}$

Where $s$ is surplus value, $v$ is variable capital, and $c$ is constant capital.

Since rate of exploitation can be written as $e = s/v$, and the organic composition of capital is $OCC = c/v$, then evaluating $p^\prime$ in terms of $e$ and $OCC$ yields:

$p^\prime = \frac{e}{1 + OCC}$

Therefore, a rising organic composition of capital leads to a declining rate of profit, cet. par.

Keep in mind that a rising organic composition of capital $OCC$ is often, in whole or part, offset by a rise in the rate of exploitation (or rate of surplus value) $e$, leading to misgivings and counter-arguments (see Michael Heinrich 2013).

== Disputes ==
=== Okishio's theorem ===
Japanese economist Nobuo Okishio argued in 1961, "if the newly introduced technique satisfies the cost criterion [i.e. if it reduces unit costs, given current prices] and the rate of real wage remains constant", then the rate of profit would increase.

Assuming constant real wages, technical change would lower the production cost per unit, thereby raising the innovator's rate of profit. The price of output would fall, and this would cause the other capitalists' costs to fall also. The new (equilibrium) rate of profit would therefore have to rise. By implication, the rate of profit could, in that case, fall if real wages rose in response to higher productivity, squeezing profits.

David Ricardo also claimed that a fall in the average rate of profit could ordinarily be brought about only by rising wages (one other scenario could be, that foreign competition would drive down the local market prices for outputs, causing falling profits).

==== Criticism to Okishio's Theorem ====
John E. Roemer criticized the absence of fixed capital in Okishio's model, and therefore modified Okishio's model, to include the effect of fixed capital. He concluded though that:

"... there is no hope for producing a falling rate of profit theory in a competitive, equilibrium environment with a constant real wage... this does not mean... that there cannot exist a theory of a falling rate of profit in capitalist economies. One must, however, relax some of the assumptions of the stark models discussed here, to achieve such a falling rate of profit theory."

It is also possible to construct an alternative Okishio-type model, in which the rising cost of land rents (or property rents) lowers the industrial rate of profit.

=== Michael Heinrich ===
Heinrich argues against giving a central place to the tendency of the rate of profit to fall, stating that Marx did not include the argument in his published theoretical work. In order to safely deduce a fall in profit as a general tendency, Marx's argument requires the presumption that the rate of surplus-value grows faster than the ratio of capital to value, which cannot be demonstrated from the concepts with which Marx is working. While the general direction of movement of both quantities may be known—both the rate of relative surplus-value, and the ratio of capital to value, are taken in ordinary capitalist conditions to increase—neither can grow without limit, and easy conclusions about their comparative rates of growth are not forthcoming. Over a decade after he wrote the manuscript that became, in Engels' edition, the third volume of Capital, Marx composed a mathematical manuscript where he deals at length with the case of rising profit-rates under an increasing value-composition of capital.

Along these lines, Heinrich challenges the identification of Marx's theories of crisis with the law of the tendency of the rate of profit to fall, a reading he attributes principally to Engels having edited the third volume of Capital so as to condense all the fragmentary discussion of crisis under the chapter title "Development of the Law's Internal Contradictions", suggesting all crisis for Marx flows from declining profit rates. Instead, Heinrich suggests we ought to follow the direction of Marx's remarks on the role of crisis in mediating breakdowns of relationships between production and consumption, and extend these arguments through more careful attention to a theory of money and credit. Further, Heinrich is sceptical of the suggestion that crisis for Marx necessarily begets collapse, arguing that the collapse theory "has historically always had an excusatory function: regardless of how bad contemporary defeats were, the opponent's end was a certainty". Heinrich argues that such a theory is not found in Marx beyond a possible trace of one in the Grundrisse, one which is not taken up in Marx's later work.

=== Competition ===
David Ricardo, interpreting Adam Smith's falling rate of profit theory to be that increased competition drives down the average rate of profit, argued that competition could only level out differences in profit rates on investments in production, but not lower the general profit rate (the grand-average profit rate) as a whole. Apart from a few exceptional cases, Ricardo claimed, the average rate of profit could only fall if wages rose.

In Capital, Karl Marx criticized Ricardo's idea. Marx argued that, instead, the tendency of the rate of profit to fall is "an expression peculiar to the capitalist mode of production of the progressive development of the social productivity of labor". Marx never denied that profits could contingently fall for a myriad of reasons, but he believed there was also a structural reason for the TRPF, regardless of current market fluctuations.

=== Productivity ===
By raising productivity, labor-saving technologies can increase the average industrial rate of profit rather than lowering it, insofar as fewer workers can produce more output at a lower cost, enabling more sales in less time. Ladislaus von Bortkiewicz stated: "Marx’s own proof of his law of the falling rate of profit errs principally in disregarding the mathematical relationship between the productivity of labour and the rate of surplus value." Jürgen Habermas argued in 1973–74 that the TRPF might have existed in 19th century liberal capitalism, but no longer existed in late capitalism, because of the expansion of "reflexive labor" ("labor applied to itself with the aim of increasing the productivity of labor"). Michael Heinrich has also argued that Marx did not adequately demonstrate that the rate of profit would fall when increases in productivity are taken into account.

=== Labor theory of value ===
Steve Keen argues that if you assume the labor theory of value is wrong, then this obviates the bulk of the critique. Keen suggests that the TRPF was based on the idea that only labor can create new value (following the labor theory of value), and that there was a tendency over time for ratio of capital to labor (in value terms) to rise. If surplus can be produced by all production inputs, then he believes there is no reason why an increase in the ratio of capital to labor inputs should cause the overall rate of surplus to decline.

Eugen Böhm von Bawerk and his critic Ladislaus Bortkiewicz (himself influenced by Vladimir Karpovich Dmitriev) claimed that Marx's argument about the distribution of profits from newly produced surplus value is mathematically faulty. This gave rise to a lengthy academic controversy. Critics claimed that Marx failed to reconcile the law of value with the reality of the distribution of capital and profits, a problem that had already preoccupied David Ricardo – who himself inherited the problem from Adam Smith, yet failed to solve it.

== Empirical research ==
=== Before 1970 ===
In the 1870s, Marx certainly wanted to test his theory of economic crises and profit-making econometrically, but adequate macroeconomic statistical data and mathematical tools did not exist to do so. Such scientific resources began to exist only half a century later.

In 1894, Friedrich Engels did mention the research of the émigré socialist Georg Christian Stiebeling, who compared profit, income, capital and output data in the U.S. census reports of 1870 and 1880, but Engels claimed that Stiebeling explained the results "in a completely false way" (Stiebeling's defence against Engels's criticism included two open letters submitted to the New Yorker Volkszeitung and Die Neue Zeit). Stiebeling's analysis represented "almost certainly the first systematic use of statistical sources in Marxian value theory."

Although Eugen Varga and the young Charles Bettelheim already studied the topic, and Josef Steindl began to tackle the problem in his 1952 book, the first major empirical analysis of long-term trends in profitability inspired by Marx was a 1957 study by Joseph Gillman. This study, reviewed by Ronald L. Meek and H. D. Dickinson, was extensively criticized by Shane Mage in 1963. Mage's work provided the first sophisticated disaggregate analysis of official national accounts data performed by a Marxist scholar.

=== After 1970 ===
There have been a number of non-Marxist empirical studies of the long-term trends in business profitability.

Particularly in the late 1970s and early 1980s, there were concerns among non-Marxist economists that the profit rate could be really falling.

Various efforts have been conducted since the 1970s to empirically examine the TRPF. Studies supporting it include those by Michael Roberts, Themistoklis Kalogerakos, Minqi Li, John Bradford, and Deepankar Basu (2012). Studies contradicting the TRPF include those by Òscar Jordà, Marcelo Resende, and Simcha Barkai. Other studies, such as those by Basu (2013), Elveren, Thomas Weiß and Ivan Trofimov, report mixed results or argue that the answer is not yet certain due to conflicting findings and issues with appropriately measuring the TRPF.

From time to time, the research units of banks and government departments produce studies of profitability in various sectors of industry. The Office for National Statistics releases company profitability statistics every quarter. In the UK, Ernst & Young (EY) nowadays provide a Profit Warning Stress Index for quoted companies. The Share Centre publishes the Profit Watch UK Report. In the US, Yardeni Research provides a briefing on S&P 500 profit margin trends, including comparisons with NIPA data.

== See also ==
- Crisis theory
- Critique of political economy
- Marginal utility § Law of diminishing marginal utility
- Diminishing returns – Economic theory
- Financial crisis
- Internal rate of return
- Iron law of wages – Proposed law of Economics
- Steady-state economy § Concept of the stationary state in classical economics
