= History of capitalist theory =

A theory of capitalism describes the essential features of capitalism and how it functions. The history of various such theories is the subject of this article.

== Overview ==
Conceptions of what constitutes capitalism have changed significantly over time, as well as being dependent on the political perspective and analytical approach adopted by the observer in question. Adam Smith focused on the role of enlightened self-interest (the "invisible hand") and the role of specialization in promoting the efficiency of capital accumulation. Ayn Rand defined capitalism as a social system based on the recognition of individual rights, including property rights, in which all property is privately owned, and called it the unknown ideal. Robert LeFevre, an American libertarian and primary theorist of autarchism, defined capitalism as savings and capital—in essence—as savings made by men, which are then invested in the tools of production. Some proponents of capitalism (like Milton Friedman) emphasize the role of free markets, which, they claim, promote freedom and democracy. For many (like Immanuel Wallerstein), capitalism hinges on the extension into a global dimension of an economic system in which goods and services are traded in markets and capital goods belong to non-state entities. For others (like Karl Marx), it is defined by the creation of a labor market in which most people must sell their labor power in order to make a living. Marx, along with others like Hilaire Belloc, also argued that capitalism differs from other market economies that feature private ownership because it features the concentration of the means of production in the hands of a few.

== Adam Smith ==
Adam Smith is considered the first theorist of what we commonly refer to as capitalism. His 1776 work, An Inquiry into the Nature and Causes of the Wealth of Nations, theorized that within a given stable system of commerce and evaluation, individuals would respond to the incentive of earning more by specializing their production. These individuals would naturally, without specific state intervention, "direct ... that industry in such a manner as its produce may be of the greatest value." This would enable the whole economy to become more productive, and it would therefore be wealthier. Smith argued that protecting particular producers would lead to inefficient production, and that a national hoarding of specie (i.e. cash in the form of coinage) would only increase prices, in an argument similar to that advanced by David Hume. His systematic treatment of how the exchange of goods, or a market, would create incentives to act in the general interest, became the basis of what was then called political economy and later economics. It was also the basis for a theory of law and government that gradually superseded the mercantilist regime then prevalent.

Smith asserts that when individuals make a trade they value what they are purchasing more than they value what they are giving in exchange for a commodity. If this were not the case, then they would not make the trade but retain ownership of the more valuable commodity. This notion underlies the concept of mutually-beneficial trade where it is held that both sides tend to benefit by an exchange.

Adam Smith is often described as the "father of capitalism" (and the "father of economics"). He described his own preferred economic system as "the system of natural liberty." Smith defined "capital" as stock, and "profit" as the just expectation of retaining the revenue from improvements made to that stock. Smith also viewed capital improvement as being the proper central aim of the economic and political system.

== Karl Marx ==
A critique of the results of capitalism was formulated by Karl Marx. According to Marx, the treatment of labor as a commodity led to people valuing things more in terms of their price rather than their usefulness (see commodity fetishism), and hence to an expansion of the system of commodities. Much of the history of late capitalism involves what David Harvey called the "system of flexible accumulation" in which more and more things become commodities, the value of which is determined through the process of exchange rather than their use. For example, not only pins are commodities; shares in the ownership of a factory that manufactures pins become commodities; then options on the stock issued in the company that operates the factory become commodities; then portions of the interest rate attached to bonds issued by the company become commodities, and so on. Speculation in these abstract commodities then drives the allocation of materials and labor.

Marx believed that the extension of the labor theory of value indicated that owners of productive means would exploit workers by depriving them of the full value that workers themselves create. According to Marx, surplus value is the difference between the value that the worker has created and the wage that the worker receives from his/her employer. Many economists have since used marginalism to dispute the Labour theory of Value.

== Historical development ==
During the course of the eighteenth and nineteenth centuries, there was a gradual movement in Europe and in the states that Europeans had founded, for the reduction of trade barriers, in particular restrictions on production and labor, the use of non-standard weights and measures, restrictions on the formation of new businesses, and royal prerogatives that interfered with the conduct of commerce. Two parallel doctrines emerged to describe and justify this process. One was the legal doctrine that the rightful owner of land or exerciser of a property right was the one that could make the best economic use of it, and that this principle must be reflected in the property laws of each nation. The other was the political doctrine of laissez-faire economics, namely that all coercive government regulation of the market represents unjustified interference, and that economies would perform best with government only playing a defensive role in order to ensure the operation of free markets.

The next major revision of the theoretical basis of capitalism began in the late 19th century with the expansion of corporations and finance, the globalization of production and markets, and the increasing desire to tap the productive capacity of the capital sectors of economies in order to secure the markets and resources required to continue economic growth. Many, particularly the wealthy, came to view the state as a vehicle for improving business conditions, securing markets, and gaining access to scarce materials—even when such objectives could only be achieved through military force. In the 1920s this philosophy found its most publicly prominent voice in President Calvin Coolidge's assertion that "the business of America is business". Critics of this period label it "corporatism", while its adherents generally regard it as a logical extension of the "laissez-faire" principles of natural liberty.

== Capitalism and imperialism ==
J. A. Hobson, a British liberal writing at the time of the fierce debate concerning imperialism during the Second Boer War, observed the spectacle of the "Scramble for Africa" and emphasized changes in European social structures and attitudes as well as capital flow, though his emphasis on the latter seems to have been the most influential and provocative. His so-called accumulation theory, very influential in its day, suggested that capitalism suffered from under-consumption due to the rise of monopoly capitalism and the resultant concentration of wealth in fewer hands, which he argued gave rise to a misdistribution of purchasing power. His thesis called attention to Europe's huge, impoverished industrial working class, which was typically far too poor to consume goods produced by an industrialized economy. His analysis of capital flight and the rise of mammoth cartels later influenced Vladimir Lenin in his book Imperialism: The Highest Stage of Capitalism, which has become a basis for the Marxist analysis of imperialism.

Contemporary World-Systems theorist Immanuel Wallerstein perhaps addresses better Hobson's counter-arguments without degrading Hobson's underlying inferences. Accordingly, Wallerstein's conception of imperialism as a part of a general and gradual extension of capital investment from the center of the industrial countries to an overseas periphery coincides with Hobson's. According to Wallerstein, Mercantilism became the major tool of semi-peripheral, newly industrialized countries such as Germany, France, Italy, and Belgium. Wallerstein thus perceives formal empire as performing a function that was analogous to that of the mercantilist drives of the late seventeenth and eighteenth centuries in England and France; consequently, the expansion of the Industrial Revolution contributed to the emergence of an era of aggressive national rivalry, leading to the late nineteenth-century scramble for Africa and the acquisition of formal empires.

== Democracy, the state, and legal frameworks ==
The relationship between the state, its formal mechanisms, and capitalist societies has been debated in many fields of social and political theory, with active discussion since the 19th century. Hernando de Soto (1941 - ) has argued that an important characteristic of capitalism is the functioning state protection of property rights in a formal property system where ownership and transactions are clearly recorded. According to de Soto, this is the process by which physical assets transform into capital, which in turn is used in many more ways and very efficiently in the market economy. A number of Marxian economists regard the inclosure acts in early-modern England (and similar legislation elsewhere) as an integral part of capitalist primitive accumulation and hold that specific legal frameworks of private land-ownership have been integral to the development of capitalism.

New institutional economics, a field pioneered by Douglass North (1920-2015), stresses the need of a legal framework in order for capitalism to function optimally, and focuses on the relationship between the historical development of capitalism and the development and maintenance of political and economic institutions. In new institutional economics and in other fields focusing on public policy, economists seek to judge when and whether governmental intervention (such as taxes, welfare, and regulation) can result in potential gains in efficiency. According to Gregory Mankiw (1958 - ), a New Keynesian economist, governmental intervention can improve on market outcomes under conditions of "market failure" or in situations in which the market on its own does not allocate resources efficiently. Market failure occurs when an externality is present and a market either underproduces a product with a positive externality, or overproduces a product that generates a negative externality. Air pollution, for instance, is a negative externality that cannot be incorporated into markets as the world's air is not owned and then sold for use to polluters. So, too much pollution could be emitted and people not involved in the production pay the cost of the pollution instead of the firm that initially emitted the air pollution. Critics of market-failure theory, like Ronald Coase (1910-2013), Harold Demsetz (1930-2019), and James M. Buchanan (1919-2013) argue that government programs and policies also fall short of absolute perfection. In this view, market failures are often small, and government failures are sometimes large. It is therefore the case that imperfect markets are often better than imperfect governmental alternatives. While all nation-states currently implement some kind of market regulations, the desirable degree of regulation is disputed.

The relationship between democracy and capitalism is a contentious area in theory and in popular political movements. The introduction of universal adult-male suffrage in 19th-century Britain occurred along with the development of industrial capitalism, and democracy became widespread at the same time as capitalism. Research on democratic peace theory further indicates that capitalist democracies rarely make war with one another and have little internal violence. However critics of the democratic peace theory note that democratic capitalist states may fight infrequently or never with other democratic capitalist states because of political similarity or political stability rather than because they are democratic (or capitalist).

Deleuze and Guattari detect "a tendency within capitalism to continually add more axioms" to its primary assumptions: "After the end of World War I, the joint influence of the world depression and the Russian Revolution forced capitalism to multiply its axioms, to invent new ones dealing with the working class, employment, union organization, social institutions, the role of the State, the foreign and domestic markets."

Some authoritarian regimes have been able to achieve economic growth without making concessions to greater political freedom.
