= Faux frais of production =

Incidental costs of production

Faux frais of production is a concept used by classical political economists and by Karl Marx in his critique of political economy. It refers to "incidental operating expenses" incurred in the productive investment of capital, which do not themselves add new value to output. In Marx's social accounting, the faux frais are a component of constant capital, or alternately are funded by a fraction of the new surplus value.

When owners of capital invest in production, they do not just invest in labor power, materials, buildings and equipment (or means of production). They must also meet a range of other operating expenses. These can include all kinds of things like bookkeeping, training, catering, cleaning & repairs, advertising, insurance, security services, bribes, taxes & levies etc. Marx has in mind mainly those circulation costs directly necessary and indispensable to keep production going, not "fringe benefits".

In modern medium-sized to large-sized business, fixed capital assets will "on average" be the largest single component of the annual tangible capital outlay. After that, materials and wages. But depending on the nature of the business, the faux frais might be a considerable proportion of the total capital outlay.

In general, Marx seems to have regarded net insurance and tax payments from gross production income as part of surplus value. But he never elaborated on this point in detail; presumably it depends on the nature of the tax and insurance claims themselves.

Professor Makoto Itoh comments:

"Unlike pure circulation costs such as bookkeeping and advertising costs which are faux frais specific only to a commodity economy, some portions of the costs of storage and transport belong substantially to production processes that are continued in the circulation sphere, and therefore add to the substance of value and surplus-value just as production costs. The rest of the costs of storage and transport, together with pure circulation costs, proceed from the mere change in the form of value, and cannot enter into the substance of value of commodities. Such circulation costs are faux frais which must be maintained by a part of surplus value."

== Illustration ==
In 2002, the US IRS tax-assessed capital costs of all US corporations with a positive net income included the following items:

- Depreciable assets (includes depletable and intangible assets) $4,715 billion
- Less: Accumulated depreciation (includes accumulated depletion and amortization) $2,330 billion
- Depreciation charged $411 billion
- Depletable assets $148 billion
- Less: Accumulated depletion $76 billion
- Depletion charged $6 billion
- Land $213 billion
- Intangible assets (amortizable) $1,411 billion
- Less: Accumulated amortization $269 billion
- Amortization charged $68 billion
- Other assets $2,396 billion
- Intermediate goods $7,541 billion
- Compensation of corporate officers $262 billion
- Salaries and wages $1,362 billion
- Employee benefit programs $167 billion
- Pension, profit-sharing, stock bonus, and annuity plans $99 billion
- Repairs $85 billion
- Bad debts $98 billion
- Rent paid on business property $260 billion
- Taxes paid $283 billion
- Interest paid $638 billion
- Advertising $160 billion
- Charitable contributions $10 billion
- Net loss, non-capital assets $15 billion
- Other deductible operating expenses $1,752 billion

In the NIPAs, the Bureau of Economic Analysis adds $26.2 billion worth of expensing on meals and entertainment, oilwell bonus payments written off, adjustments for insurance carriers and savings and loan associations, amortization of intangible assets, and tax-exempt interest income.

== See also ==
- Capital accumulation
- Constant capital
- Das Kapital
- Intermediate consumption
