= Cape Verde and the World Bank =

Cape Verde joined the World Bank on November 20, 1978, after declaring its independence from Portugal in 1975. The first agreement with the IDA occurred on February 8, 1983, supporting the Praia Port Project for the amount of $7,200,000. Since then 45 other projects have been approved through the World Bank totaling in $445,200,000. A majority of projects were focused around the central government, followed by industrial and trade services. Other projects were approved in transportation, energy, social protection, and ports. As of November 29, 2019, there are nine active projects funded by the IBRD and IDA totaling $156,000,000.

== World Bank fiscal strategy in the upcoming years ==
The World Bank contributes Cape Verde's growth to the increase in tourism, capital accumulation, poverty reduction, and more shared prosperity. Following these increases, Gross national income hit $3,630 allowing Cabo Verde to escape the United Nations' list of LDC's. The strategy set in place by the World Bank following this exclusion from the LDC list was described in their fiscal year 2015-2017 Country Partnership Strategy (CPS) which focused on enhancing macro-fiscal stability and improving competitiveness within private sector development. Private sector development will mainly include improvements in tourism, fisheries, technology, and agricultural sectors. Some problems that the World Bank outlined for Cape Verde to account for are government liability and national unemployment. With the population growing and less employment opportunities, the World Bank has a firm stance on closing the significant skill gaps within the employment market and a shift to promoting increased productivity within the country. Along with these issues it has been stated that Cape Verde needs to address reforms in the investment sector in order to increase their global competitiveness. Public spending in the health and education sectors are also within the World Bank's suggested fiscal strategy, and the positive outcomes from altering such public spending may result in an increase in capital and a reduction in national debt.
