= Constant and variable capital =

Capital invested in means of production

Constant capital (c; German: konstantes Kapital) is a concept created by Karl Marx and used in Marxian political economy. It refers to one of the forms of capital invested in production, which contrasts with variable capital (v; German: variables Kapital). The distinction between constant and variable refers to an aspect of the economic role of factors of production in creating a new value.

Constant capital includes (1) fixed assets, i.e. physical plant, machinery, land and buildings, (2) raw materials and ancillary operating expenses (including external services purchased), and (3) certain faux frais of production (incidental expenses). Variable capital, by contrast, refers to the capital outlay on labour costs insofar as they represent workers' earnings, the sum total of wages.

The concept of constant vs. variable capital contrasts with that of fixed vs. circulating capital (used not only by Marx but by David Ricardo and other classical economists). The latter distinction corresponds to the very common distinction in economics between fixed inputs (and costs) and variable inputs (and costs). It distinguishes inputs from the point of view of their user (the capitalist), in terms of the degree of flexibility that the user has in using them. On the other hand, constant capital refers to the non-human inputs into production, while variable capital refers to the human input (the hiring of labor power to do labor).

== Measurement ==
Constant capital can be measured as a stock magnitude, i.e., the total value of means of production in use at a specific point in time. It can also be measured as a flow magnitude, i.e., the total value of raw materials and fixed means of production used up in an accounting period. Which measure is used depends on the purposes and assumptions of one's analysis, for example, whether one is interested in the unit-costs of output or in the rate of return on capital invested.

The flow value divided by the stock value provides a measure of the number of rotations of the stock (the speed of turnover or turnover time) in an accounting period. It is strongly related to the actual depreciation rate of fixed capital. Alternatively, the stock value divided by the flow value is what Marx called the "turnover time".

The faster the turnover of constant capital (i.e., the shorter the turnover time), other things being equal, the higher the rate of profit.

The concept of "constant capital" is closely related to the concept of "real capital" which is used by Marx to distinguish physical capital goods from fictitious capital.

== Why "constant"? ==
Marx calls the constant part of the capital "constant" because according to his labour theory of value, constant capital inputs - once produced, purchased, withdrawn from the market and used to create new products - do not by themselves add new value to output, or increase in value in the production process. Instead, the value of equipment and materials being used in production is conserved and transferred to the new product by living labor. For example, if a machine that is used to make cars costs $1 million and it is used to make 10,000 cars before it is worn out and replaced, then each car would have $100 worth of that machine in it (constant capital involves both fixed costs and unit costs).

It is true that the ruling market prices for constant capital inputs could change after they have been bought for use in production, but normally this cannot affect those inputs (having been withdrawn from the market for use in production), only the market valuation of the outputs created from those inputs.

== Variable capital ==
Constant capital contrasts with variable capital, v, the cost incurred in hiring labor power. Marx argues that only living labour creates new value. The higher value of output, compared to input costs, is (other things being equal) attributable to the exploitation of living labor-power only. Variable capital is "variable" because its value changes (varies) within the production process, as the worker can produce value over and above what he needs to live (the "necessary labor time"), which is paid in wages. As the worker produces more than he is paid in wages, he thus creates new value. Although most commentaries on Marx do not acknowledge this, these changes could be both positive or negative. A misapplication of labour, or the devaluation of types of labour activity by the market can mean the loss of part of the capital invested, or all of it. However, Marx does generally assume that labour will accomplish the valorisation of capital.

An example of variable capital would be as follows: a worker is hired for $100 and uses $1000 of materials and components to create a product which is sold for $1300. This would be $1000 constant capital plus $100 variable capital plus $200 surplus value. The $200 surplus value was added solely by the activity of the worker - of the $1100 investment, only the $100 variable capital expanded. The $1000 constant capital was transferred from the materials and components to the product and thus produced no new value.

== Criticism ==
Critics of Marxian value theory object that labor is not the only source of value-added goods. Some of this disagreement is purely terminological: neo-classical theorists tend to understand “value” as a transhistorical phenomenon, whereas in Marx’s sense the value form is specific to the capital relation and is not synonymous with price, cost, or utility.

Examples of such arguments:

- devaluations or revaluations of types of assets in response to changing demand conditions, which are influenced by price inflation. In national accounts and business accounts, for example, the change in the value of inventories held is adjusted for changes in their current market prices, affecting the profit calculation.
- Steve Keen argues that "Essentially, Marx reached the result that the means of production cannot generate surplus value by confusing depreciation, or the loss of value by a machine, with value creation". His argument is, that a machine can add value to new output in excess of the value of economic depreciation charged. Keen uses an analogy with labor to demonstrate the problem:

If workers receive a subsistence wage, and if the working day exhausts the capacity to labor, then it could be argued that in a day a worker “depreciates” by an amount equivalent to the subsistence wage—the exchange-value of labor power. However this depreciation is not the limit of the amount of value that can be added by a worker in a day’s labor—the use-value of labor. Value added is unrelated to and greater than value lost; if it were not, there could be no surplus.

- Keen further argues that Marx speculated that machines could have a use-value greater than their exchange-value, much like labor. Keen argues that though Marx did not develop this point, if it was developed then this would mean that the amount of value a machine loses in depreciation will be less than the value it contributes to output, allowing it to be a source of surplus value alongside labor.
- Another argument is that Marx's theory does not account for things such as time. For example, yeast is added to crushed grapes to turn them into wine. No human labor is involved yet the value of the wine is higher than that of the grapes. Another example is that wine gains value as it ages, even though for Marx the aging process shouldn't add value. This would indicate value could arise from sources other than labor.
- It has also been argued that Marx's theory ignores time preference (the common preference for goods and services immediately rather than later). Workers generally prefer to be paid when their work is completed rather than when it is sold (which could be much later). For workers to be paid immediately, they must be given wages - thus their service has a value. It is argued that the labor theory of value would "have it both ways" - workers would receive the full future value of their product before it is actually sold.

== Marxist response ==
According to some Marxists, the first two types of objection above cut to the heart of the main dispute between Marx and mainstream economic theory—their different conceptions of value.

For Marx's critics, value, if it exists at all, is a technical feature of economic calculus or is simply another word for the price of a product.

For Marx, however, economic value is a social attribution, which expresses a social relation between people that is specific to certain historical conditions. Inanimate objects can only feature in value relations as tokens of prior human effort, since they are not social beings. Thus, it is not the machine with which new outputs are produced that itself adds value to those outputs, but rather the people operating the machine who permit its value to be conserved and who operate the transfer of part of its value to the new outputs.

Another clarification is that Marx may have used the terms fixed and variable capital to emphasize the idea that the input cost of compensation can be varied by the enterprise, which sets the compensation levels of its workers, whereas the price of the other input factors sold to the company is "fixed," insofar as it is set by external vendors.

== The particular fetish of the money commodity as capital ==
The fact that the productive force of labour appears within capitalism as the productive force of capital was for Marx an example of reification of the relations of production or of commodity fetishism. In other words, property (a "thing") is given human powers and characteristics which it does not truly have. Economists talk about the "productivity of capital" to describe the yield or return on capital, but capital itself "produces" nothing, people do that.

The fetish of capital is broken as soon as living labour is withdrawn; then it becomes clear that the constant part of capital produces nothing, and declines in value. Because of its role as a traditional money commodity some individuals give a reference display of this fetish by seeing gold as the only 'real' money, even in the current time when most money is lacking any substantial form whatsoever, even paper.

== Different capital compositions ==
The ratio, c/v is one measure of the organic composition of capital.

As noted above, the distinction between constant and variable capital overlaps with the distinction between fixed capital and circulating capital. Constant capital has both fixed and circulating components: for example, the fixed constant capital would include a factory and the machinery in it, while the circulating constant capital would include the raw materials used and the intermediate inputs produced by the factory.

Variable capital is almost exclusively a component of circulating capital. However, the salaries of some "overhead" employees (who have long-term security from being fired or laid off) are in effect, fixed elements of variable capital.

== See also ==
- Capital accumulation
- Division of labour
- Factors of production
- Faux frais of production
- Organic composition of capital
- Productive and unproductive labour
- Surplus value
- Surplus product
- Surplus labour
