= Ethiopian Horticulture Development Agency =

Horticultural association based in Addis Ababa, Ethiopia

The Ethiopian Horticulture Development Agency (EHDA) is a horticultural organization based in Addis Ababa, Ethiopia. This government agency aims to make Ethiopia a leading African country in export-led horticulture or the cultivation of Ethiopian flowers, vegetables, fruits, and herbs to be sold overseas. Its main objective is to ensure the fast and sustainable growth of the country's horticulture export industry by providing support to the three pillars of development: investment, capacity building (i.e. pre- and post-harvest management), and marketing.
