= Inventory investment =

Accumulation of unsold goods

Inventory investment (also private inventory) is a component of gross domestic product (GDP). What is produced in a certain country is naturally also sold eventually, but some of the goods produced in a given year may be sold in a later year rather than in the year they were produced. Conversely, some of the goods sold in a given year might have been produced in an earlier year. The difference between goods produced (production) and goods sold (sales) in a given year is called inventory investment. The concept can be applied to the economy as a whole or to an individual firm, however this concept is generally applied in macroeconomics (economy as a whole). Unintended unsold stock of goods increases inventory investment.

== Definition of inventory investment ==
- Inventory investment = production – sales

Thus, if production per unit time exceeds sales per unit time, then inventory investment per unit time is positive; as a result, at the end of that period of time the stock of inventory inventories on hand will be greater than it was at the beginning. The reverse is true if production is less than sales.

== Mathematical relationship of inventory investment to inventories ==
In discrete time, the end-of-period stock of inventories minus the beginning-of-period stock of inventories equals the flow of inventory investment per time period.

In continuous time, the time derivative of the stock of inventories equals the instantaneous flow of inventory investment.

== Intended and unintended inventory investment ==
A positive flow of intended inventory investment occurs when a firm expects that sales will be high enough that the current level of inventories on hand may be insufficient—perhaps because in the presence of very short-term fluctuations in the timing of customer purchases, there is a risk of temporarily being unable to supply the product when a customer demands it. To avoid that prospect, the firm deliberately builds up its inventories—that is, engages in positive intended inventory investment by deliberately producing more than it expects to sell. Economists view this positive intended inventory investment as a form of spending—in effect, the firm is buying inventories from itself.

Conversely, if a firm decides that its current level of inventories is unjustifiably high—some of the inventories are taking up costly warehouse space while exceeding what is needed to prevent stock-outs—then it will engage in a negative flow of intended inventory investment. It does this by deliberately producing less than what it expects to sell.

Positive or negative unintended inventory investment occurs when customers buy a different amount of the firm's product than the firm expected during a particular time period. If customers buy less than expected, inventories unexpectedly build up and unintended inventory investment turns out to have been positive. If customers buy more than expected, inventories unexpectedly decline and unintended inventory investment turns out to have been negative.

Either positive or negative intended inventory investment can coincide with either positive or negative unintended inventory investment. They are separate, unrelated events: one is based on deliberate actions to adjust the stock of inventories, while the other results from mispredictions of customer demand.

To help reduce costs associated with inventory management, (holding costs, shortage costs, spoilage costs, etc.) inventory management practices like vendor managed inventory have been adopted by retailers.

== Relationship to macroeconomic equilibrium ==
In macroeconomics, equilibrium in the goods market occurs when the supply of goods (output) equals the demand for goods (the sum of various types of expenditure—consumer expenditure, government expenditure on goods, net expenditures by people outside the country on the country's exports, fixed investment expenditure on physical capital, and intended inventory investment). If these are indeed equal for a particular time period, there is no unintended inventory investment and there is goods market equilibrium. If they are not equal, there is disequilibrium in the goods market. This is reflected in the presence of positive or negative unintended inventory investment.

== Inventory investment over the business cycle ==
A typical business cycle plays out in the following way. Starting from some point in the business cycle, some group (consumers, government, purchasers of exports, etc.) decides for some reason to have a sustained increase in their spending. This may come as a surprise to producers, who initially experience negative inventory investment as their sales have unexpectedly exceeded their production. Now their inventories are too low, for two reasons: (1) Inventories have accidentally gone down, and (2) the optimal level of inventories—what producers want to have on hand—has gone up because sustained customer demand has gone up and there is increased danger of temporary stock-outs. In order to build inventories up to an appropriate level, firms engage in positive intended inventory investment. This positive flow of intended inventory investment continues until the target level of inventories is reached. During this time, the economy is in a boom both due to the original sustained increase in spending and due to the positive flow of intended inventory investment.

At some point, there is a sustained decline in some type of spending for some reason. (One reason may simply be that, once inventories reach their desired level, there stops being positive intended inventory investment; but there may be other reasons as well.) Then there is positive unintended inventory investment as firms are caught by surprise by the external drop in demand and they fail to simultaneously lower their production. Now inventories are too high, for two reasons: (1) They have accidentally risen, and (2) the optimal level of inventories is lower now due to the new, lower level of sustained demand. So in order to lower their inventories, firms deliberately cut back their production to below the level of demand by their customers, thus causing inventories to be deliberately drawn down—that is, intended inventory investment is negative. Intended inventory investment remains negative until the target level of inventories is reached. During this time, the economy, having peaked out, is in a downturn (a recession) both due to the sustained decrease in non-inventory expenditure and due to the negative flow of intended inventory investment.

At some point, there is a sustained increase in some type of spending for some reason. (One reason may simply be that, once inventories sink to their desired level, there stops being negative intended inventory investment, which goes up from negative to zero; but again there may be other reasons as well.) At this point there is negative unintended inventory investment as firms are caught by surprise by the external increase in demand and they fail to simultaneously raise their production. Now inventories are too low, again for two reasons, and we are back where we started in the cycle. The recession has bottomed out, sustained spending is once again high, target inventory levels are higher than actual inventory levels, and intended inventory investment is positive.
