= Overaccumulation =

Cause of the crisis of capital accumulation and labor devaluation in a capitalist economy

Overaccumulation is one of the potential causes of the crisis of capital accumulation. In crisis theory, a crisis of capital occurs due to what Karl Marx refers to as the internal contradictions inherent in the capitalist system which result in the reconfiguration of production. The contradiction in this situation is realized because of the condition of capitalism that requires the accumulation of capital through the continual reinvestment of surplus value.

Accumulation can reach a point where the reinvestment of capital no longer produces returns. When a market becomes flooded with capital, a massive devaluation occurs. This overaccumulation is a condition that occurs when surpluses of devalued capital and labor exist side by side with seemingly no way to bring them together. The inability to procure adequate value stems from a lack of demand.

The term "overaccumulation" is also used in a neoclassical context.

== Examples ==
The Great Depression of the 1930s and 40s resulted, in part, due to major devaluation of capital and labor concluding in massive unemployment. The 1980s were also dangerous times for capitalist industrial nations when unemployment rose over 10 percent in 1983 and massive amounts of inventory lay unsold.

== Strategies ==
Capitalism has adapted to this crisis in two ways. The first solution to the problem is resolved using a "spatial fix." The regionality of overaccumulation allows the crisis to be relieved by moving capital or labor to a different territory and beginning new production. This solution relieves the surplus by moving it into a region that has a higher demand for it.

A second solution to overaccumulation involves the creation of new markets. If demand does not exist for the excess accumulation, then one can be created by opening up non-capitalist markets.

== See also ==
- Crisis theory
- Overproduction
- Underconsumption
- Capital accumulation
- Business cycle
- Capitalism
