= Stock and flow =

Types of quantities in financial fields

Stock vs. flow

Dynamic stock and flow diagram

Economics, business, accounting, and related fields often distinguish between quantities that are stocks and those that are flows. These differ in their units of measurement. A stock is measured at one specific time, and represents a quantity existing at that point in time (say, December 31, 2004), which may have accumulated in the past. A flow variable is measured over an interval of time. Therefore, a flow would be measured per unit of time (say a year). Flow is roughly analogous to rate or speed in this sense.

For example, U.S. nominal gross domestic product refers to a total number of dollars spent over a time period, such as a year. Therefore, it is a flow variable, and has units of dollars/year. In contrast, the U.S. nominal capital stock is the total value, in dollars, of equipment, buildings, and other real productive assets in the U.S. economy, and has units of dollars. The diagram provides an intuitive illustration of how the stock of capital currently available is increased by the flow of new investment and depleted by the flow of depreciation.

== Stocks and flows in accounting ==
Thus, a stock refers to the value of an asset at a balance date (or point in time), while a flow refers to the total value of transactions (sales or purchases, incomes or expenditures) during an accounting period. If the flow value of an economic activity is divided by the average stock value during an accounting period, we obtain a measure of the number of turnovers (or rotations) of a stock in that accounting period. Some accounting entries are normally always represented as a flow (e.g. profit or income), while others may be represented both as a stock or as a flow (e.g. capital).

A person or country might have stocks of money, financial assets, liabilities, wealth, real means of production, capital, inventories, and human capital (or labor power). Flow magnitudes include income, spending, saving, debt repayment, fixed investment, inventory investment, and labor utilization. These differ in their units of measurement. Capital is a stock concept which yields a periodic income which is a flow concept.

== Comparing stocks and flows ==
Stocks and flows have different units and are thus not commensurable – they cannot be meaningfully compared, equated, added, or subtracted. However, one may meaningfully take ratios of stocks and flows, or multiply or divide them. This is a point of some confusion for some economics students, as some confuse taking ratios (valid) with comparing (invalid).

The ratio of a stock over a flow has units of (units)/(units/time) = time. For example, the debt to GDP ratio has units of years (as GDP is measured in, for example, dollars per year whereas debt is measured in dollars), which yields the interpretation of the debt to GDP ratio as "number of years to pay off all debt, assuming all GDP devoted to debt repayment".

The ratio of a flow to a stock has units 1/time. For example, the velocity of money is defined as nominal GDP / nominal money supply; it has units of (dollars / year) / dollars = 1/year.

In discrete time, the change in a stock variable from one point in time to another point in time one time unit later (the first difference of the stock) is equal to the corresponding flow variable per unit of time. For example, if a country's stock of physical capital on January 1, 2010 is 20 machines and on January 1, 2011 is 23 machines, then the flow of net investment during 2010 was 3 machines per year. If it then has 27 machines on January 1, 2012, the flow of net investment during 2010 and 2011 averaged $3 \tfrac{1}{2}$ machines per year.

In continuous time, the time derivative of a stock variable is a flow variable.

== More general uses ==
Stocks and flows also have natural meanings in many contexts outside of economics, business and related fields. The concepts apply to many conserved quantities such as energy, and to materials such as in stoichiometry, water reservoir management, and greenhouse gases and other durable pollutants that accumulate in the environment or in organisms. Climate change mitigation, for example, is a fairly straightforward stock and flow problem with the primary goal of reducing the stock (the concentration of durable greenhouse gases in the atmosphere) by manipulating the flows (reducing inflows such as greenhouse gas emissions into the atmosphere, and increasing outflows such as carbon dioxide removal). In living systems, such as the human body, energy homeostasis describes the linear relationship between flows (the food we eat and the energy we expend along with the wastes we excrete) and the stock (manifesting as our gain or loss of body weight over time). In Earth system science, many stock and flow problems arise, such as in the carbon cycle, the nitrogen cycle, the water cycle, and Earth's energy budget. Thus stocks and flows are the basic building blocks of system dynamics models. Jay Forrester originally referred to them as "levels" rather than stocks, together with "rates" or "rates of flow".

A stock (or "level variable") in this broader sense is some entity that is accumulated over time by inflows and/or depleted by outflows. Stocks can only be changed via flows. Mathematically a stock can be seen as an accumulation or integration of flows over time – with outflows subtracting from the stock. Stocks typically have a certain value at each moment of time – e.g. the number of population at a certain moment, or the quantity of water in a reservoir.

A flow (or "rate") changes a stock over time. Usually we can clearly distinguish inflows (adding to the stock) and outflows (subtracting from the stock). Flows typically are measured over a certain interval of time – e.g., the number of births over a day or month.

Synonyms

Stock	Flow
Level	Rate
Integral	Derivative
State Variable	

== Examples ==
=== Accounting, finance, etc. ===
"Stock"	Possible units of stock	"Inflow(s)"	"Outflow(s)"	Possible units of flow
bank balance	yen	deposits interest	withdrawals	yen per month
inventory of lumber	board feet	incoming lumber	outgoing lumber	board feet per week
housing stock	dollars or housing units	housing investment or new homes built	housing depreciation or housing units lost	dollars per year or units of housing
equity shareholdings	company shares	purchases of shares	sales of shares	shares per month

=== Other contexts ===
"Stock"	Possible units of stock	"Inflow(s)"	"Outflow(s)"	Possible units of flow
CO_{2} in atmosphere	tons	tons emitted	tons sequestered	tons per day
guests in a hotel	persons	guests arriving	guests leaving	persons per day
population	persons	births immigration	deaths emigration	persons per year
water in bathtub	liters	water pouring in	water draining out	liters per second
waste in disposal site	tons	dumping waste	decay of waste	tons per week
fuel tank	gallons	refueling	fuel consumption	gallons per month

== Calculus interpretation ==
If the quantity of some stock variable at time $\,t\,$ is $\,Q(t)\,$, then the derivative $\,\frac{dQ(t)}{dt}\,$ is the flow of changes in the stock. Likewise, the stock at some time $t$ is the integral of the flow from some moment set as zero until time $t$.

For example, if the capital stock $\,K(t)\,$ is increased gradually over time by a flow of gross investment $\,I^g(t)\,$ and decreased gradually over time by a flow of depreciation $\,D(t)\,$, then the instantaneous rate of change in the capital stock is given by

$$\frac{dK(t)}{dt} = I^g(t) - D(t) = I^n(t)$$

where the notation $\,I^n(t)\,$ refers to the flow of net investment, which is the difference between gross investment and depreciation.

== Example of dynamic stock and flow diagram ==
Dynamic stock and flow diagram

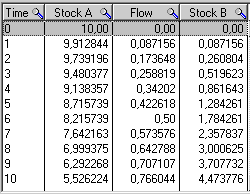
Ten first stocks and flow values

Equations that change the two stocks via the flow are:

$$\ \text{Stock A} = \int_0^t -\text{Flow }\,dt$$

$$\ \text{Stock B} = \int_0^t \text{Flow }\,dt$$

List of all the equations, in their order of execution in each time, from time = 1 to 36:

$$1) \ \text{Flow}= \sin( 5t )$$

$$2.1) \ \text{Stock A}\ -= \text{Flow}\$$

$$2.2) \ \text{Stock B}\ += \text{Flow}\$$

== History ==
The distinction between a stock and a flow variable is elementary, and dates back centuries in accounting practice (distinction between an asset and income, for instance). In economics, the distinction was formalized and terms were set in (Fisher 1896), in which Irving Fisher formalized capital (as a stock).

Polish economist Michał Kalecki emphasized the centrality of the distinction of stocks and flows, caustically calling economics "the science of confusing stocks with flows" in his critique of the quantity theory of money (circa 1936, frequently quoted by Joan Robinson).

== See also ==
- Flow (disambiguation)
- Intensive and extensive properties
- Stock (disambiguation)
- Stock-Flow consistent model
- Systems thinking
- System dynamics
- Wealth (economics)
