= Fixed capital =

Long-lived physical assets used repeatedly in production

In accounting, fixed capital is any kind of real, physical asset that is used repeatedly in the production of a product. In economics, fixed capital is a type of capital good that as a real, physical asset is used as a means of production which is durable or isn't fully consumed in a single time period. It contrasts with circulating capital such as raw materials, operating expenses etc.

The concept was first theoretically analyzed in some depth by the economist Adam Smith in The Wealth of Nations (1776) and by David Ricardo in On the Principles of Political Economy and Taxation (1821). Ricardo studied the use of machines in place of labor and concluded that workers' fear of technology replacing them might be justified.

Thus fixed capital is that portion of the total capital outlay that is invested in fixed assets (such as land improvements, buildings, vehicles, plant, and equipment), that stay in the business almost permanently—or at the very least, for more than one accounting period. Fixed assets can be purchased by a business, in which case the business owns them. They can also be leased, hired or rented, if that is cheaper or more convenient, or if owning the fixed asset is practically impossible (for legal or technical reasons).

Refining the classical distinction between fixed and circulating capital in Das Kapital, Karl Marx emphasizes that the distinction is really purely relative, i.e. it refers only to the comparative rotation speeds (turnover time) of different types of physical capital assets. Fixed capital also "circulates", except that the circulation time is much longer, because a fixed asset may be held for 5, 10 or 20 years before it has yielded its value and is discarded for its salvage value. A fixed asset may also be resold and re-used, which often happens with vehicles and planes.

In national accounts, fixed capital is conventionally defined as the stock of tangible, durable fixed assets owned or used by resident enterprises for more than one year. This includes plant, machinery, vehicles and equipment, installations and physical infrastructures, the value of land improvements, and buildings.

The European system of national and regional accounts (ESA95) explicitly includes produced intangible assets (e.g. mineral rights, computer software, copyright protected entertainment, literary and artistics originals) within the definition of fixed assets.

Land itself is not included in the statistical concept of fixed capital, even though it is a fixed asset. The main reason is that land is not regarded as a product (a reproducible good). But the value of land improvements is included in the statistical concept of fixed capital, is regarded as the creation of value-added through production.

== Estimating the value ==
There are two primary methods for estimating the stock of fixed capital in any nation: direct measurement of the capital stock and perpetual inventory calculations. Attempts have been made to estimate the value of the stock of fixed capital for the whole economy using direct enterprise surveys of "book value", administrative business records, tax assessments, and data on gross fixed capital formation, price inflation and depreciation schedules. A pioneer in this area was the economist Simon Kuznets.

The "perpetual inventory method" (PIM) used to estimate fixed capital stocks was invented by Raymond W. Goldsmith in 1951 and subsequently used around the world. The basic idea of the PIM method is, that one starts off from a benchmark asset figure, and adds on the net additions to fixed assets year by year (using gross fixed capital formation data), while deducting annual estimates of economic depreciation based upon an explicit service life assumption, all data being adjusted for price inflation using a capital expenditure price index. In this way, one obtains a time series of annual fixed capital stocks. This data series can also be modified further with various other adjustments for prices, economic depreciation, etc. (several variants of the PIM approach are nowadays used by economic historians and statisticians).

Estimates of fixed nonresidential business capital have been prepared in varying detail by the United States Bureau of Economic Analysis (BEA) since the mid-1950s, and estimates of residential capital have been prepared since 1970. (The bureau produces )... annual estimates for the years since 1925 of gross and net stocks, depreciation, discards, ratios of net to gross stocks, and average ages of ВИвнgross and net stocks in historical, constant, and current cost valuations by legal form of organization (financial corporations, nonfinancial corporations, sole proprietorships and partnerships, other private business). The fixed nonresidential business capital estimates are also available within each legal form by major industry group (farm, manufacturing, nonfarm nonmanufacturing), and the residential estimates are also available by tenure group (owner-occupied and tenant-occupied). Estimates of capital stocks (capital goods) and related measures by detailed types of assets are also available.

== Economic depreciation ==
Depreciation as an economic concept distinguishes between "...the value of the stock of capital assets and the annual value of that asset's services, distinguishing between depreciation and inflation as sources of the change in asset value, and distinguishing between the depreciation in asset values and deterioration in an asset's physical productivity." Depreciation is the cost of the stock of capital assets allocated over their service lives in proportion to estimates of their service lives, net of maintenance and repair costs.

In theory, the service life used in determining the allocation is the physical life-the length of time it is physically possible to use the asset. In some instances, this is longer than the economic life-the length of time it is economically feasible to use the asset. (The service life estimate does not)... reflect the effect of obsolescence. ... (and)... charged when the asset is retired. The reason for this treatment is that obsolescence has little if any effect on the time pattern of services provided by the asset before retirement, even though it is a determinant of the timing of retirement. The charge for obsolescence at retirement writes off the remainder of the asset as a component of capital consumption and in effect replaces the physical life with the economic service life.

Economic depreciation, therefore, is "...the decline in asset price (or shadow price) is due to aging and varies with age" Economic depreciation is also characterized by an " ... age-price relationship in which the largest rate of price decline occurs in the early years of asset life." The depreciation write-off permitted for tax purposes may also diverge from that of economic depreciation or "real" depreciation rates. The key factor is the estimate of "economic service life". Economic depreciation can, however, be estimated with "...sufficient precision to be useful in policy analysis."

Economic analysis of growth and production, as well as the distribution of income, requires accurate estimates of capital stocks and of capital income. The estimation of capital stocks in turn requires an estimate of the quantity of capital used up in production, and the estimation of capital income requires an estimate of the corresponding loss in capital value. Thus, even if depreciation policy ignores economic depreciation, we must still try to measure economic depreciation for use in national income and wealth accounting.

== Investment risk ==
A business executive who invests in or accumulates fixed capital is tying up wealth in a fixed asset, hoping to make a future profit. Thus, such investment usually implies a risk. Sometimes depreciation write-offs are also viewed partly as compensation for this risk. Often leasing or renting a fixed asset (such as a vehicle) rather than buying it is preferred by enterprises because the cost of using it is lowered thereby, and the real owner may be able to obtain special tax advantages.

== Sources of funding for fixed capital investment ==
An owner can obtain funding for the purchase of fixed capital assets from the aptly named capital market, where loans are given on a long-term basis. Funding can also come from reserve funds, the selling of shares, and the issuing of debentures, bonds or other promissory notes.

== Factors which influence fixed-capital requirements ==
- The nature of the undertaking- the nature of the business, certainly plays a role in determining fixed capital requirements. A florist, for example, needs less fixed capital than a vehicle-assembly factory.
- The size of the undertaking- a general rule that states: the bigger the business, the higher the need for fixed capital.
- The stage of development of the undertaking- the requirement of capital for a new undertaking is usually greater than that needed for an established business that has reached optimum size.

== See also ==
- Capital
- Capital accumulation
- Capital formation
- Consumption of fixed capital
- Fixed investment
- Gross fixed capital formation
- Organic composition of capital
- (Capital) stock and flow

§ Listed in The New Palgrave Dictionary of Economics
