= Circulating capital =

Items that exist only to create services or goods

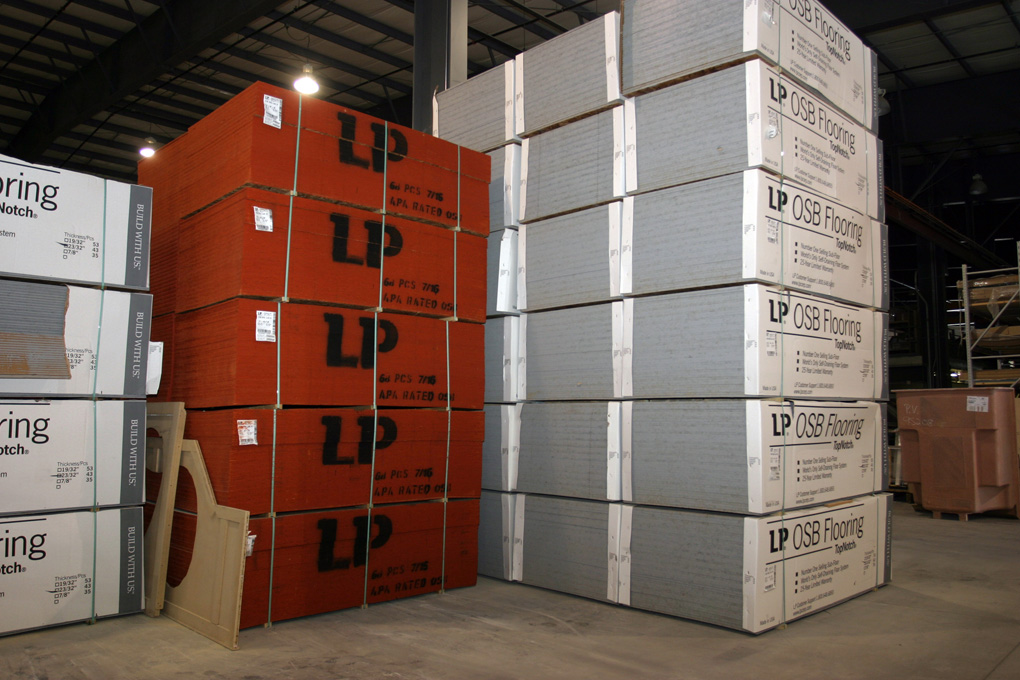
Bulk material to be used up in the production of manufactured goods

Circulating capital includes intermediate goods and operating expenses, i.e., short-lived items that are used in production and used up in the process of creating other goods or services. This is roughly equal to intermediate consumption. Finer distinctions include raw materials, intermediate goods, inventories, ancillary operating expenses and (working capital). It is contrasted with fixed capital. The term was used in more specialized ways by classical economists such as Adam Smith, David Ricardo and Karl Marx.

Where the distinction is used, circulating capital is a component of (total) capital, also including fixed capital used in a single cycle of production. In contrast to fixed capital, it is used up in every cycle (raw materials, basic and intermediate materials, combustible, energy…). In accounting, the circulating capital comes under the heading of current assets.

Building on the work of Quesnay and Turgot, Adam Smith (1776) made the first explicit distinction between fixed and circulating capital. In his usage, circulating capital includes wages and labour maintenance, money, and inputs from land, mines, and fisheries associated with production.

According to Karl Marx (second volume of Das Kapital, end of chapter 7) the turnover of capital influences "the processes of production and self-expansion", the two new forms of capital, circulating and fixed, "accrue to capital from the process of circulation and affect the form of its turnover". In the following chapter Marx defines fixed capital and circulating capital. In chapter 9 he claims: "We have here not alone quantitative but also qualitative difference."

Conventionally, (physical) capital assets held by a business for more than one year are regarded in annual accounting statements as "fixed", the rest as "circulating". In modern economies such as the United States, roughly half of the intermediate inputs bought or used by businesses are in fact services, and not goods.
