= Rate of exploitation =

Concept in Marxian economics

In Marxian economics, the rate of exploitation is the ratio of the total amount of unpaid labor done (surplus-value) to the total amount of wages paid (the value of labour power). The rate of exploitation is often also called the rate of surplus-value.

== Divergence of the two rates ==
Marx did not regard the rate of surplus value and the rate of exploitation as necessarily identical, insofar as there was a divergence between surplus value realised and surplus value produced. Thus, the quantity of surplus labour performed by workers in an enterprise might correspond to a value higher or lower than the surplus value actually realised as profit income upon sales of output. The implication is that if the gross profit volume was related to wage costs to establish the rate of surplus value, this might overstate or understate the real rate of labor-exploitation. Although this is a subtle point, it has sometimes played an important role in wage bargaining negotiations by trade unions. For an extreme example, workers might work extremely hard in an enterprise which nevertheless operates at a loss. For another extreme example, workers might work less hard, knowing that their product will sell like hotcakes in a seller's market at sharply inflated prices, yielding profits disproportionate to labour input. The divergence between surplus value realised and surplus value produced becomes even more marked if surplus value is viewed in terms of the net incomes of social classes, i.e. net labor income and net property income. Marx identified five different formulae for the rate of surplus value (see surplus value).

== See also ==
- Exploitation of labour
- Marginal product of labor
- Rate of profit
- Technological unemployment
