= Rate of profit =

Relative profitability of a project

In economics and finance, the profit rate is the relative profitability of an investment project, a capitalist enterprise or a whole capitalist economy. It is similar to the concept of rate of return on investment. Scholarship has shown that the profit rate has fallen since 1945, especially after the Great Recession.

Entrepreneurship drives a need to maintain (a) the rate of profit and (b) "meeting a finite payoff period on capital investment."

== Factors ==
The rate of profit depends on the definition of capital invested, and taxable income.

In today's complicated tax environment, with tax avoidance strategies, variable tariffs, and international tax shelters, much of a company's after-tax income can be much lower or much higher than it appears.

== A prisoner's dilemma ==
If firms achieve higher sales per worker the more they invest per worker, they will try to increase investments per worker, as long as this raises their rate of profit. If some capitalists do this, all capitalists must do it, because those who do not will fall behind in competition.

This, however, means that replacement cost of capital per worker invested, now calculated at the replacement cost necessary to keep up with the competition, tends to be increased by firms more so than sales per worker before. This squeeze, that investments per worker tend to be driven up by competition more so than before sales per worker have been increased, causes the tendency of the rate of profit to fall. Thus, capitalists are caught in a prisoner's dilemma or rationality trap.

This "new" rate of profit (r'), which tends to fall, would be measured as

r' = (surplus-value)/(capital to be invested for the next period of production in order to remain competitive).

== Marxian economics ==
In Marxian political economy, the rate of profit (r) would be measured as

r = (surplus value)/(capital invested).

where surplus value corresponds to unpaid labor in the production process or to profits, interest, and rent (property income). This formula can be further deconstructed into smaller constituent parts. As noted, Marxian economic theory predicted the falling rate of profit.

== See also ==
- Capital accumulation – Dynamic that motivates pursuit of profit
- Internal rate of return – Method of calculating an investment's rate of return
- Okishio's theorem – Economic theorem regarding rate of profit
- Profit (accounting) – Income distributed to BSC
- Profit (economics) – Concept in economics
- Rate of exploitation – Concept in Marxian economics
- Return on capital – Measure of profitability relative to invested capital
- Tax avoidance – Financial optimization technique
- Tax shelter – Method of reducing taxes owed
- Tendency of the rate of profit to fall – Hypothesis in Marxist economics
