= Physical capital =

Tangible man-made goods that help and support production

Physical capital represents in economics one of the three primary factors of production. Physical capital is the apparatus used to produce a good and services. Physical capital represents the tangible man-made goods that help and support the production. Inventory, cash, equipment or real estate are all examples of physical capital.

== Definition ==
N.G. Mankiw definition from the book Economics: Capital is the equipment and structures used to produce goods and services. Physical capital consists of man-made goods (or input into the process of production) that assist in the production process. Cash, real estate, equipment, and inventory are examples of physical capital.

Capital goods represents one of the key factors of corporation function. Generally, capital allows a company to preserve liquidity while growing operations, it refers to physical assets in business and the way a company have reached their physical capital. While referring how companies have obtained their capital it is important to consider both - physical capital and human capital. Based on economic theory, physical capital represents one of the three primary factors of production, that is also recognized as inputs production function. The others are natural resources (including land), and labour. The word "Physical" is used to distinguish physical capital from human capital and financial capital. "Physical capital" denote to fixed capital, all other sorts of real physical asset that are not included in the production of a product is distinguished from circulating capital.

== Physical capital in accounting ==
Biased on the order of solvency of a physical capital, it is listed on the balance sheet. The impact of investments of human capital and physical capital can be measured and analysed with the same ratios to measure and analyse the investment performance of physical assets. Both of these investments lead to fundamental improvements in the business model and better overall decision-making. The balance sheet provides an overview, which consist of both physical and human capital, of the value of all physical and some non-physical assets, but it also provides an overview of the capital raised to pay for those assets. Physical capital is noted on the balance sheet as an asset at historical cost, not market value. As a result, the book value of assets is generally higher than market value. Accountants refer to physical capital as a tangible asset. Compering the physical capital and human capital is easy to find on the balance, but the human capital is often only assumed. In addition to goodwill, analysts can value the impact of human capital on operations with efficiency ratios, such as return on assets (ROA) and return on equity (ROE). The value of human capital can be also determined by the investors in the mark-up on products sold or the industry premium on salary, for instance a company is willing to pay more for an experienced programmer who can produce a higher-margin product. In this case the value of the programmer's experience is the amount the company is willing to pay over and above the market price.

== Production function ==
Production function definition by N.G. Mankiw: Production function is the relationship between the quantity of inputs used to make a good and the quantity of output of that good.

Co-operation of four factors of production capital, land, labor and organization crates the result in production of goods, biased on this fact no goods can be produced without the help of these four factors, actually all four are usually used in some technical proportion, with the aim to maximize profit with a minimal cost by the best combination of factors of production. Best combination for producer is enabled by applying the principles of equip-marginal returns and substitution. The principle of equip-marginal returns states that, any producer can have maximum production only when the marginal returns of all the factors of production are equal. For instance, when the marginal product of the land is equal to that of labour, capital and organisation, the production becomes maximum. Production function shoes how much output producer can expect in exact proportion of labour and capital as well as of labour etc. Differently, production function is an indicator of the physical relationship between the inputs and output of a firm. Like the demand function a production function is for a definite period. It shows the flow of inputs resulting into a flow of output during some time. The production function of a firm depends on the state of technology. With every development in technology the production function of the firm undergoes a change. The new production function brought about by developing technology displays same inputs and more output or the same output with lesser inputs. Sometimes a new production function of the firm may be adverse as it takes more inputs to produce the same output. Mathematical description of basic relationship between inputs and outputs:

Q = f (L, C, N) Q = Quantity of output L = Labour C = Capital N = Land

The level of output (Q) depends on the quantities of different inputs (L, C, N) available to the firm. In the simplest case, where there are only two inputs, labour (L) and capital (C) and one output (Q), the production function becomes. Q =f (L, C) The production function is a technical or engineering relation between input and output. If the natural laws of technology remain unchanged, the production function remains unchanged.

== Features of production function ==
The production function consists of 3 main features – Substitutability, Complementarity and Specificity. 1. Substitutability: By changing the number and amount of some inputs, while the others stay unchanged, we achieve the possibility, to modify the total output. It is the substitutability of the factors of production that gives rise to the laws of variable proportions. 2. Complementarity: is that two or more inputs are to be used together as nothing will be produced if the quantity of either of the inputs used in the production process is zero. Another example of complementarity is the principles of returns to scale of inputs as it reveals that the quantity of all inputs has to increased simultaneously in order to attain a higher scale of total output. 3. Specificity: Every product has its own specific number and type of inputs. Machines and equipment's, specialized workers and raw materials or commodities are a few examples of the specificity of factors of production. This reveals that in the production process none of the factors can be ignored and in some cases ignorance to even slightest extent is not possible if the factors are perfectly specific. Production consists of time; hence, the way the inputs are combined is determined to a large extent by the time period under consideration. The greater the time period, the greater the freedom the producer must vary the quantities of various inputs used in the production process. In the production function, variation in total output by varying the quantities of all inputs is possible only in the long run whereas the variation in total output by varying the quantity of single input may be possible even in the short run.

== See also ==
- Human capital
- Capital (economics)
- Capital good
