= Fixed investment =

Purchasing of newly produced fixed capital

Fixed investment in economics is the purchase of newly produced physical asset, or, fixed capital. It is measured as a flow variable – that is, as an amount per unit of time.

Thus, fixed investment is the sum of physical assets such as machinery, land, buildings, installations, vehicles, or technology. Normally, a company balance sheet will state both the amount of expenditure on fixed assets during the quarter or year, and the total value of the stock of fixed assets owned.

Fixed investment contrasts with investments in labour, ongoing operating expenses, materials or financial assets. Financial assets may also be held for a fixed term (for example, bonds) but they are not usually called "fixed investment" because they do not involve the purchase of physical fixed assets. The more usual term for such financial investments is "fixed-term investments". Bank deposits committed for a fixed term such as one or two years in a savings account are similarly called "fixed-term deposits".

Statistical measures of fixed investment, such as provided by the Bureau of Economic Analysis in the United States, Eurostat in Europe, and other national and international statistical offices (e.g., the International Monetary Fund), are often considered by economists to be important indicators of longer-term economic growth (the growth of output and employment) and potential productivity.

The more fixed capital is used per worker, the more productive the worker can be, other things being equal. For example, a worker who tills the soil only with a spade is normally less productive than a worker who uses a tractor-driven plough to do the same work, because with a tractor one can plough more land in less time, and thus produce more in less time, even if a tractor costs more than a spade. Obviously one would not normally use a tractor to plough a small garden, but in large-scale farming the income earned using a tractor by far outweighs the expense of using a tractor. It is not economical to use a spade for large-scale ploughing, unless the labour is extremely cheap, and the supply of labour is plentiful.

The level of fixed investment by businesses also indicates something about the level of confidence that business owners or managers have about the ability to earn more income from sales in the next few years. The reasoning is that they would be unlikely to tie up additional capital in fixed assets for several years or more, unless they thought it would be a commercially viable proposition in the longer term. If there is too much uncertainty about whether their fixed investment will pay off, they are unlikely to engage in it.

In recent decades, the growth rate of fixed investment in the US, Europe and Japan was relatively low, but in China for example it is relatively high. Often the relativities are expressed as a ratio between gross fixed capital formation and GDP, or fixed investment per worker employed or per capita.

== Why fixed? ==
The use of the term "fixed" does necessarily not mean the asset "stays in one place", i.e., it does not mean that it is physically immobile, but it refers rather to the circulation (rotation) of flows of capital.

Normally, for the purpose of accounting, fixed investment refers to "physical assets held for one year or more". The investment capital is therefore "fixed", in the precise sense that the capital is tied up in physical assets for a longer time, and thus cannot be used for other purposes. This contrasts with, for example, investment capital in the form of liquid bank deposits earning interest, or investment in raw materials completely used up in (say) five weeks to produce products which, upon sale, earn income the following month.

The term "fixed investment" may be somewhat ambiguous, because it could refer to the value of a stock of fixed assets being held at a balance date, or as in economics, to the value of a flow of expenditures on fixed assets across an accounting interval, such as a year. The distinction is not always clearly stated in statistical tabulations—they might refer either to the stock of capital tied up in fixed assets at a balance date, or to how much was spent on fixed equipment during a quarter or year.

== Measurement ==
The amount of fixed investment may be stated "gross" (before taking into account depreciation) or "net" (after depreciation). By subtracting disposals of fixed assets from additions to fixed assets in an accounting period, we obtain a measure of the net (fixed) capital formation.

In official statistics, attempts are often made to estimate the value of fixed capital assets in a nation, the value of their depreciation (or consumption of fixed capital) and the value of gross fixed capital formation by sector and type of asset. Fixed assets depreciate over time, due to wear and tear and market obsolescence. At the end of their useful lifetime (perhaps 7–10 years), they possess only a scrap-value (or at the very least must undergo maintenance work or repairs).

The concept of "gross fixed capital formation" (GFCF) used in official statistics however does not refer to total fixed investment in a country.

- Firstly GFCF measures only the value of additions to the fixed capital stock less the value of disposals of scrapped fixed assets. So normally total fixed investment in a year is in fact a larger value than GFCF. "Total fixed investment" (gross) is not usually a published statistical measure, since economists are interested primarily in the contribution of fixed investment to value added, i.e., they are interested in the net additions made to the total fixed capital stock (additions less withdrawals). If, hypothetically, the amount of fixed investment and the amount of scrapped fixed assets are equal in value, then the total fixed investment figure would tell us only that the scrapped fixed assets have been replaced. If we want to know by how much the fixed capital stock has increased, we need to know the relationship between fixed assets purchased and disposals of fixed assets.
- Secondly, GFCF does not include land purchases, only investments in land improvement, mainly because land purchased by one person or company from another does not normally increase the total amount of land there is (except in cases of land reclamation such as polders). All that happens is that the same land changes owners. If land is sold, it may yield a capital gain for the seller, but such profits from land sales are not usually made explicit in official statistics, in part because a standard valuation of what the land was previously worth is often difficult to operationalize, in particular if the land was improved or developed by the seller. The value of land can increase or decline due to all kinds of factors, and land valuations may differ from place to place. At best one could estimate the total value of land sales in an accounting interval.

For statistical purposes, investment in fixed capital must be distinguished from investment in intermediate goods. Unlike fixed assets, intermediate goods (for example, commodities like oil, electricity, timber, steel and grain) are completely used up in production (usually within a year). But this distinction is not always easy to draw, for example:

- if raw materials are held for more than one year before they are used,
- if expenditure occurs to install, service, insure or repair fixed assets (which can be part of the purchase contract)
- if physical "fixed" assets are sold off again in less than one year.

In official statistics, various accounting conventions are adopted to deal with these problems in a standardized way. A further complication is that scrapped fixed assets, being second-hand goods, may be resold and re-used again (for example, second-hand vehicles).

== Theories of fixed investment determination ==
One theory of the determination of fixed investment focuses on the discrepancy between the current quantity of the fixed capital stock and the optimal or target capital stock. The target capital stock—the level at which a firm's profits would be highest if actual fixed capital holdings equaled that level—is determined as the level at which the marginal product of capital equals the marginal cost of capital. Then the flow of net investment per unit of time is determined by balancing losses from having a less-than-optimal level of capital with the adjustment costs of installing new capital; these adjustment costs in per-unit terms may be an increasing function of the speed of installation.

Another theory of fixed investment determination is based on Tobin's q, the ratio of the market value to the acquisition cost of an additional unit of physical capital; investment is hypothesized to be an increasing function of this ratio.

== Trends ==
Fixed investments nowadays can be enormous (for example, a nuclear power plant might be built for three billion dollars). This creates more risk and means that many financial guarantees and insurance arrangements become necessary.

== See also ==
- Capex
- Capital accumulation
- Capital formation
- Consumption of fixed capital
- Depreciation
- Economics terminology that differs from common usage
- Fixed capital
- Gross fixed capital formation
- Inventory investment
- Opex
- Opportunity cost
- Sunk cost
