= Labour power =

Capacity to do work in Marxism

Labour power (German: Arbeitskraft; French: force de travail) is the capacity to work, a key concept used by Karl Marx in his critique of capitalist political economy. Marx distinguished between the capacity to do the work, i.e. labour power, and the physical act of working, i.e. labour. Human labour power exists in any kind of society, but on what terms it is traded or combined with means of production to produce goods and services has historically varied greatly.

The general idea of labour-power had existed previously in classical political economy. Adam Smith's The Wealth of Nations and David Ricardo's On the Principles of Political Economy and Taxation already referred to the "productive powers of labour". However, Marx made the concept much more precise, critically examining the functions of labour-power in production, how labour-power is used, organized and exploited, and how it is typically valued and priced in bourgeois society.

Under capitalism, according to Marx, the productive powers of labour appear as the creative power of capital. Indeed, "labour power at work" becomes a component of capital, it functions as working capital. Work becomes just work, workers become an abstract labour force, labour becomes an economic input or a factor of production, and the control over work becomes mainly a management prerogative.

== Definition ==
Karl Marx introduces the concept in chapter 6 of the first volume of Capital, as follows:

"By labour-power or capacity for labour is to be understood the aggregate of those mental and physical capabilities existing in a human being, which he exercises whenever he produces a use-value of any description."

He adds further on that:

"Labour-power, however, becomes a reality only by its exercise; it sets itself in action only by working. But thereby a definite quantity of human muscle, nerve. brain, &c., is wasted, and these require to be restored."

Another explanation of labour-power can be found in the introduction and second chapter of Marx's Wage Labour and Capital (1847). Marx also provided a short exposition of labour power in Value, Price and Profit (1865).

== Labour power and labour ==
For Marx, Arbeitskraft, which he sometimes instead refers to as Arbeitsvermögen ("labour-ability" or "labour-capacity") refers to a "force of nature": the physical ability of human beings and other living things to perform work, including mental labour and skills such as manual dexterity, in addition to sheer physical exertion. Labour power is, in this sense, also the aspect of labour that becomes a commodity within capitalist society and is alienated from labourers when it is sold to capitalists.

By contrast, "labour" may refer to all or any activity by humans (and other living creatures) that is concerned with producing goods or services (or what Marx calls use-values). In this sense, the usage of labour (per se) in Marxian economics is somewhat similar to the later concept, in neoclassical economics, of "labour services".

The distinction between labour and labour-power, according to Marx, helped to solve a problem that David Ricardo had failed to solve, i.e. explaining why the surplus value resulting from profit normally arises out of the process of production itself—rather than in the investment of capital (e.g. the advance of money-capital in the form of wages) in labour-power (acquired from labourers).

According to Marx,

"The profit that the capitalist makes, the surplus-value which he realises, springs precisely from the fact that the labourer has sold to him not labour realised in a commodity, but his labour power itself as a commodity. If he had confronted the capitalist in the first form, as a possessor of commodities, the capitalist would not have been able to make any profit, to realise any surplus-value, since according to the law of value exchange is between equivalents, an equal quantity of labour for an equal quantity of labour. The capitalist’s surplus arises precisely from the fact that he buys from the labourer not a commodity but his labour-power itself, and this has less value than the product of this labour-power, or, what is the same thing, realises itself in more materialised labour than is realised in itself."

Marx's concept of labour power is sometimes compared to that of human capital. However, Marx himself would most likely have considered a concept such as "human capital" to be a reification, the purpose of which was to suggest that workers were really capitalist investors. In Capital, Vol. 2, Marx writes sarcastically:

Apologetic economists... say:... [the worker's] labour-power, then, represents his capital in commodity-form, which yields him a continuous revenue. Labour-power is indeed his property (ever self-renewing, reproductive), not his capital. It is the only commodity which he can and must sell continually in order to live, and which acts as capital (variable) only in the hands of the buyer, the capitalist. The fact that a man is continually compelled to sell his labour-power, i.e., himself, to another man proves, according to those economists, that he is a capitalist, because he constantly has "commodities" (himself) for sale. In that sense a slave is also a capitalist, although he is sold by another once and for all as a commodity; for it is in the nature of this commodity, a labouring slave, that its buyer does not only make it work anew every day, but also provides it with the means of subsistence that enable it to work ever anew."

== Labour power as commodity ==
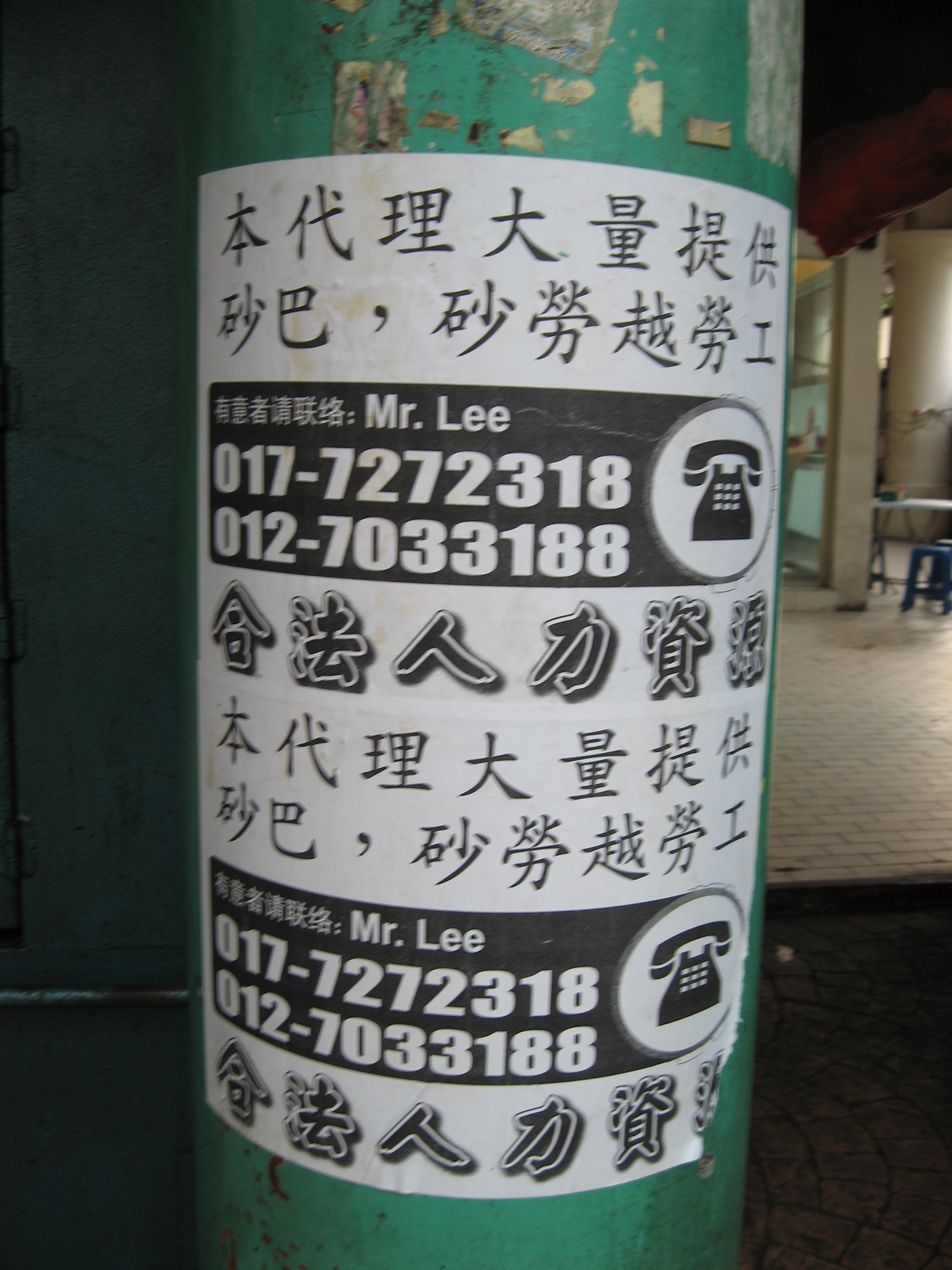
An advertisement for labour from Sabah and Sarawak, seen in Jalan Petaling, Kuala Lumpur

Under capitalism, according to Marx, labour-power becomes a commodity – it is sold and bought on the market. A worker tries to sell his or her labour-power to an employer, in exchange for a wage or salary. If successful (the only alternative being unemployment), this exchange involves submitting to the authority of the capitalist for a specific period of time.

During that time, the worker does actual labour, producing goods and services. The capitalist can then sell these and obtain surplus value; since the wages paid to the workers are lower than the value of the goods or services they produce for the capitalist.

Labour power can also be sold by the worker on "own account", in which case he is self-employed, or it can be sold by an intermediary, such as a hiring agency. In principle a group of workers can also sell their labour-power as an independent contracting party. Some labour contracts are very complex, involving a number of different intermediaries.

Normally, the worker is legally the owner of his labour power, and can sell it freely according to his own wishes. However, most often the trade in labour power is regulated by legislation, and the sale may not be truly "free"—it may be a forced sale for one reason or another, and indeed it may be bought and sold against the real wishes of the worker even although he owns his own labour power. Various gradations of freedom and unfreedom are possible, and free wage labour can combine with slave labour or semi-slavery.

The concept of labour power as a commodity was first explicitly stated by Friedrich Engels in The Principles of Communism (1847):

"Labor [power] is a commodity, like any other, and its price is therefore determined by exactly the same laws that apply to other commodities. In a regime of big industry or of free competition—as we shall see, the two come to the same thing—the price of a commodity is, on the average, always equal to its cost of production. Hence, the price of labor is also equal to the cost of production of labor. But, the costs of production of labor consist of precisely the quantity of means of subsistence necessary to enable the worker to continue working, and to prevent the working class from dying out. The worker will therefore get no more for his labor than is necessary for this purpose; the price of labor, or the wage, will, in other words, be the lowest, the minimum, required for the maintenance of life.

Marx considered the sale and purchase of labour-power "the absolute foundation of capitalist production"; the reason was that "[m]aterial wealth transforms itself into capital simply and solely because the worker sells his labour-power in order to live."

== The value of labor power ==
Labour power is a peculiar commodity, because it is an attribute of living persons, who own it themselves in their living bodies. Because they own it within themselves, they cannot permanently sell it to someone else; in that case, they would be a slave, and a slave does not own himself. Yet, although workers can hire themselves out, they cannot "hire out" or "lease" their labour, since they cannot reclaim or repossess the labour at some point after the work is done, in the same way as rental equipment is returned to the owner. Once labour has been expended, it is gone, and the only remaining issue is who benefits from the results, and by how much.

Labour power can become a marketable object, sold for a specific period, only if the owners are constituted in law as legal subjects who are free to sell it, and can enter into labour contracts. Once actualised and consumed through working, the capacity to work is exhausted, and must be replenished and restored.

In general, Marx argues that, in capitalism, the value of labour power (as distinct from fluctuating market prices for work effort) is equal to its normal or average (re-)production cost, i.e. the cost of meeting the established human needs which must be satisfied in order for the worker to turn up for work each day fit to work. This involves goods and services representing a quantity of labour equal to necessary labour or the necessary product. It represents an average cost of living and an average living standard.

The general concept of the "value of labour power" is necessary because both the conditions of the sale of labour power, and the conditions under which goods and services are purchased by the worker with money from a salary, can be affected by numerous circumstances. If, for example, the state imposes a tax on consumer goods and services (an indirect tax or consumption tax such as value-added tax or goods and services tax), then what the worker can buy with his wage-money is reduced. Or, if price inflation increases, then again the worker can buy less with his wage money. This can occur independently of how much a worker is actually paid. Therefore, the standard of living of a worker can rise or fall quite independently of how much he is paid—simply because goods and services become more expensive or cheaper to buy, or because he is blocked from access to goods and services.

Included in the value of labour power is both a physical component (the minimum physical requirements for a healthy worker) and a moral-historical component (the satisfaction of needs beyond the physical minimum which have become an established part of the lifestyle of the average worker). The value of labour power is thus a historical norm, which is the outcome of a combination of factors: productivity; the supply and demand for labour; the assertion of human needs; the costs of acquiring skills; state laws stipulating minimum or maximum wages, the balance of power between social classes, etc.

Buying labour power usually becomes a commercially interesting proposition only if it can yield more value than it costs to buy, i.e. employing it yields a net positive return on capital invested. However, in Marx's theory, the value-creating function of labour power is not its only function; it also importantly conserves and transfers capital value. If labour is withdrawn from the workplace for any reason, typically the value of capital assets deteriorates; it takes a continual stream of work effort to maintain and preserve their value. When materials are used to make new products, part of the value of materials is also transferred to the new products.

Consequently, labour power may be hired not "because it creates more value than it costs to buy", but simply because it conserves the value of a capital asset which, if this labour did not occur, would decline in value by an even greater amount than the labour cost involved in maintaining its value; or because it is a necessary expense which transfers the value of a capital asset from one owner to another. Marx regards such labour as "unproductive" in the sense that it creates no new net addition to total capital value, but it may be essential and indispensable labour, because without it a capital value would reduce or disappear. The larger the stock of assets which is neither an input nor an output to real production, and the wealthier society's elite becomes, the more labour is devoted only to maintaining the mass of capital assets rather than increasing its value.

== Wages and labour costs ==
Marx regards money-wages and salaries as the price of labour power (though workers can also be paid "in kind"), normally related to hours worked or output produced. That price may contingently be higher or lower than the value of labour power, depending on market forces of supply and demand, on skill monopolies, legal rules, the ability of negotiate, etc. Normally, unless government action prevents it, high unemployment will lower wages, and full employment will raise wages, in accordance with the laws of supply and demand. But wages can also be reduced through high price inflation and consumer taxes. Therefore, a distinction must always be drawn between nominal gross wages and real wages adjusted for tax and price inflation, and indirect tax imposts must be considered.

The labour-costs of an employer are not the same as the real buying power a worker acquires through working. An employer usually also has to pay taxes & levies to the government in respect of workers hired, which may include social security contributions or superannuation benefits. In addition there are often also administrative costs. So, in the United States for example, out of the total expenditure on labour by employers, the workers get about 60% as take-home pay, but about 40% consists of taxes, benefits and ancillary costs. Employers may be able to claim back part of the surcharge on labour by means of various tax credits, or because the tax on business income is lowered.

There is typically a constant conflict over the level of wages between employers and employees, since employers seek to limit or reduce wage-costs, while workers seek to increase their wages, or at least maintain them. How the level of wages develops depends on the demand for labour, the level of unemployment, and the ability of workers and employers to organise and take action with regard to pay claims.

Marx regarded wages as the "external form" of the value of labour power. The compensation of workers in capitalist society could take all kinds of different forms, but there was always both a paid and unpaid component of labour performed. The "ideal" form of wages for capitalism, he argued, were piece wages because in that case the capitalist paid only for labour which directly created those outputs adding value to his capital. It was the most efficient form of exploitation of labour power.

== Workers' consumption ==
When labour power has been purchased and an employment contract signed, normally it is not yet paid for. First, labour power must be put to work in the production process. The employment contract is only a condition for uniting labour power with the means of production. From that point on, Marx argues, labour power at work is transformed into capital, specifically variable capital which accomplishes the valorisation process.

Functioning as variable capital, living labour creates both use values and new value, conserves the value of constant capital assets, and transfers part of the value of materials and equipment used to the new products. The result aimed for is the valorisation of invested capital, i.e. other things being equal, the value of capital is maintained and has also increased through the activity of living labour.

At the end of the working day, labour power has been more or less consumed, and must be restored through rest, eating and drinking, and recreation.

Medical estimates of the average holiday time necessary for fulltime workers to fully recuperate in a physiological and psychological sense from work stress during the year differ from country to country; but as an approximate gauge, three weeks continuous holiday is physiologically optimal for the average worker.

ILO statistics show a wide range of average hours worked and average holidays for different countries; for example, Korean workers work the most hours per year, and Americans have fewer formal holidays than West Europeans.

Several researchers have questioned however to what extent additional hours worked really increase the marginal productivity of labour; particularly in services, the work that gets done in five days could often also be done in four. The most difficult aspect to measure is the intensity of work, though some argue the incidence of work accidents are a reliable yardstick. If workers are laid off by an organization, but the organization continues to produce the same amount of output or services as before, or even more, with the same technology, we can often conclude that the intensity of work must have increased.

== The reproduction of workers ==
Marx himself argued that:

"The maintenance and reproduction of the working-class is, and must ever be, a necessary condition to the reproduction of capital. But the capitalist may safely leave its fulfilment to the labourer's instincts of self-preservation and of propagation. All the capitalist cares for, is to reduce the labourer's individual consumption as far as possible to what is strictly necessary..."

This understanding, however, only captures the sense in which the reproduction of labour power comes at no cost to capitalists, like the reproduction of ecological conditions, but unlike the reproduction of, say, machine bolts and plastic wrap. Elites and governments have always sought to actively intervene or mediate in the process of the reproduction of labour power, through family legislation, laws regulating sexual conduct, medical provisions, education policies, and housing policies. Such interventions always carry an economic cost, but that cost can be socialized or forced upon workers themselves, especially women. In these areas of civil society, there has been a constant battle between conservatives, social reformists and radicals.

Marxist-Feminists have argued that in reality, household (domestic) labour by housewives which forms, maintains and restores the capacity to work is a large "free gift" to the capitalist economy. Time use surveys show that formally unpaid and voluntary labour is a very large part of the total hours worked in a society. Markets depend on that unpaid labour to function at all. Some feminists have therefore demanded that the government pay "wages for housework". This demand conflicts with the legal framework of the government in capitalist society, which usually assumes a financial responsibility only for the upkeep of "citizens" and "families" lacking other sources of income or subsistence.

Other social scientists have tackled this issue from a supercapitalist perspective. Economist Shirley P. Burggraf's parental dividend concept proposes the replacement of existing government payments to the elderly based on an individual's payroll tax contributions (e.g. US Social Security), with a new system granting retirement benefits proportional to the income of one's own children. Such a system could theoretically introduce a return on investment for reproductive labor, thereby incentivizing the care and rearing of children.

== State management of labour relations ==
The state can influence both the value and price of labour-power in numerous different ways, and normally it regulates wages and working conditions in the labour market to a greater or lesser extent. It can do so for example by:

- Stipulating minimum and maximum wage rates for work.
- Stipulating maximum and minimum working hours, and the retirement age.
- Stipulating minimum requirements for working conditions, workplace health and safety issues and the like.
- Stipulating requirements for labour contracts, trade union organization and wage bargaining.
- Legally defining the civil rights and entitlements of the workers.
- Adjusting direct and indirect tax rates, levies and tariffs for wage earners and employers in various ways.
- Adjusting social insurance policies, pension charges/claims and the like.
- Instituting and adjusting unemployment benefits and other social benefits.
- Subsidizing workers or their employers in various ways through eligibility to various benefits or supplements to salary.
- Influencing the general price level, by means of fiscal policy and monetary policy, or by instituting price controls for consumer goods and services.
- Regulating the consumption of goods and services by workers.
- Policing workers on the job and off-work, and prosecuting criminal activity with respect to workers' lives.
- Requiring military service from young workers at fixed pay rates.
- Creating additional jobs and employment by means of various policies, or, permitting unemployment to grow.
- Encouraging or preventing labour mobility and job mobility.
- Permitting or preventing the inflow of immigrant workers, or the emigration of workers.
- Stipulating legal requirements relating to the accommodation, health, sex life, family situation and pregnancy of workers.
- Organizing training schemes for workers.

Marx was very aware of this and in Das Kapital provides many illustrations, often taken from the Blue Books and factory inspector's reports. Part of the role of the state is to secure those general (collective) conditions for the reproduction and maintenance of workers which individuals and private enterprise cannot secure by themselves for one reason or another—for example, because:

- providing those conditions practically requires an authority which stands above competing interests.
- meeting the conditions is too costly for private agencies, requiring investment funds not available to them.
- it is technically not possible to privatize those conditions.
- the conditions that have to be supplied are not sufficiently profitable, or too risky for private agencies.
- there is a specific political or moral reason why the state should intervene.

However, Marx did not provide a general theory of the state and the labour market. He intended to write a separate book on the subject of wages and the labour market (see Capital Vol. 1, Penguin edition, p. 683), but did not accomplish it, mainly because of bad health. Nevertheless, Marx made quite clear his belief that capitalism "overturns all the legal or traditional barriers that would prevent it from buying this or that kind of labour-power as it sees fit, or from appropriating this or that kind of labour" (Ibid., p. 1013). It is possible—apart from bad health—that he did not write a general critique of the state, because he lived himself as an exile in Britain, and therefore, he might have got into major trouble personally, if he had criticized the state publicly in his writings in ways not acceptable to the British state.

In modern times, the fact that the state has a big effect on wages and the value of labour power has given rise to the concepts of the social wage and collective consumption. If the state claims just as much money from workers through taxes and levies as it pays out to them, then it is of course doubtful whether the state really "pays a social wage". However, more often the state redistributes income from one group or workers to another, reducing the income of some and increasing that of others.

== Quotation by Marx on the value of labour power and classical political economy ==
"Classical Political Economy borrowed from every-day life the category "price of labour" without further criticism, and then simply asked the question, how is this price determined? It soon recognized that the change in the relations of demand and supply explained in regard to the price of labour, as of all other commodities, nothing except its changes i.e., the oscillations of the market-price above or below a certain mean. If demand and supply balance, the oscillation of prices ceases, all other conditions remaining the same. But then demand and supply also cease to explain anything. The price of labour, at the moment when demand and supply are in equilibrium, is its natural price, determined independently of the relation of demand and supply. And how this price is determined is just the question. Or a larger period of oscillations in the market-price is taken, e.g., a year, and they are found to cancel one the other, leaving a mean average quantity, a relatively constant magnitude. This had naturally to be determined otherwise than by its own compensating variations. This price which always finally predominates over the accidental market-prices of labour and regulates them, this "necessary price" (Physiocrats) or "natural price" of labour (Adam Smith) can, as with all other commodities, be nothing else than its value expressed in money. In this way Political Economy expected to penetrate to the value of labour through the medium of the accidental prices of labour. As with other commodities, this value was then further determined by the cost of production. But what is the cost of production-of the labourer, i.e., the cost of producing or reproducing the labourer himself? This question unconsciously substituted itself in Political Economy for the original one; for the search after the cost of production of labour as such turned in a circle and never left the spot. What economists therefore call value of labour, is in fact the value of labour-power, as it exists in the personality of the labourer, which is as different from its function, labour, as a machine is from the work it performs. Occupied with the difference between the market-price of labour and its so-called value, with the relation of this value to the rate of profit, and to the values of the commodities produced by means of labour, &c., they never discovered that the course of the analysis had led not only from the market-prices of labour to its presumed value, but had led to the resolution of this value of labour itself into the value of labour-power. Classical economy never arrived at a consciousness of the results of its own analysis; it accepted uncritically the categories "value of labour," "natural price of labour," &c.,. as final and as adequate expressions for the value-relation under consideration, and was thus led, as will be seen later, into inextricable confusion and contradiction, while it offered to the vulgar economists a secure basis of operations for their shallowness, which on principle worships appearances only."

— Marx, Capital Vol. 1, chapter 19

== Labour market flexibilisation ==
The commercial value of human labour power is strongly linked to the assertion of human needs by workers as citizens. It is not simply a question of supply and demand here, but of human needs which must be met. Therefore, labour costs have never been simply an "economic" or "commercial" matter, but also a moral, cultural and political issue.

In turn, this has meant that governments have typically strongly regulated the sale of labour power with laws and rules for labour contracts. These laws and rules affect e.g. the minimum wage, wage bargaining, the operation of trade unions, the obligations of employers in respect of employees, hiring and firing procedures, labour taxes, and unemployment benefits.

This has led to repeated criticism from employers that labour markets are over-regulated, and that the costs and obligations of hiring labour weigh too heavily on employers. Moreover, it is argued that over-regulation prevents the free movement of labour to where it is really necessary. If labour markets were deregulated by removing excessive legal restrictions, it is argued that costs to business would be reduced and more labour could be hired, thereby increasing employment opportunities and economic growth.

However, trade union representatives often argue that the real effect of deregulation is to reduce wages and conditions for workers, with the effect of reducing market demand for products. In turn, the effect would be lower economic growth and a decline in living standards, with increased casualisation of labour and more "contingent labour". It is argued that, because the positions of employees and employers in the market are unequal (it is usually easier for an employer to loose an employee than an employee to loose an employer), employees must be legally protected against undue exploitation. Otherwise employers will simply hire workers as and when it suits them, without regard for their needs as citizens. A further twist in some countries is that unions are part of the political establishment, and not interested in collecting complaints and suggestions from individual employees, employing staff in proportion to dues received, backing employees' legal cases, or rocking the boat in their public statements. For example, in China some workers are in prison for criticising the official unions.

Often the demand for "labour market flexibility" is combined with the demand for strong immigration controls, to block any movement of labour which would be only a burden for capital accumulation. The term "flexibility" is used because, while capital must be able to move freely around the globe, the movement of labour must be strictly controlled. If that control does not exist, it is argued, it could mean additional costs to employers and taxpayers.

== Criticism ==
It has been argued by Ian Steedman that Marx's own concept of labour power was in truth very similar to that of David Ricardo and Adam Smith and, therefore, that Marx was not saying anything really new. However, Marx's interpretation is (as he himself said) different from the "natural price of labour" of the classical political economists, because the "free play of market forces" does not gravitate spontaneously and automatically toward the "natural price" (the value) of labour power. Precisely because labour power is a unique and peculiar commodity, being lodged in the living worker, it does not conform to all the same laws as other kinds of commodities. Depending on social conditions, labour power may durably trade at prices well above, or below, its real value. Marx only assumed that labour power traded at its value, in order to show that even if that was the case, the worker was still economically exploited. But he was well aware that often labour power did not trade at its value, either because of unfavourable wage-bargaining conditions or because of labour scarcity.

A recent criticism by Prof. Marcel van der Linden is as follows: "Marx's thesis is based on two dubious assumptions, namely that labour needs to be offered for sale by the person who is the actual bearer and owner of such labour, and that the person who sells the labour sells nothing else. Why does this have to be the case? Why can labour not be sold by a party other than the bearer? What prevents the person who provides labour (his or her own or that of somebody else) from offering packages combining the labour with labour means? And why can a slave not perform wage labour for his master at the estate of some third party?" This difficulty was first noted in research conducted during the 1980s by Tom Brass, gathered together in his 1999 book.

The buying and selling of human work effort can and has taken many more different forms than Marx acknowledges—especially in the area of services. A modern information society makes possible all kinds of new forms of hustling. Marx said himself that "Above all [capitalism] overturns all the legal or traditional barriers that would prevent it from buying this or that kind of labour-power as it sees fit, or from appropriating this or that kind of labour". The concept of the value of labour power referred to the underlying economic relationship, not to be confused with the formalities of all the kinds of labour contracts which are possible.

== See also ==
- Abstract labour and concrete labour
- Compensation of employees
- Reserve army of labour
- Surplus labour
- Surplus product
- Wage labour
