= Capital accumulation =

Dynamic that motivates pursuit of profit

Capital accumulation is the dynamic that motivates the pursuit of profit, involving the investment of money or any financial asset with the goal of increasing the initial monetary value of said asset as a financial return whether in the form of profit, rent, interest, royalties or capital gains. The goal of accumulation of capital is to create new fixed capital and working capital, broaden and modernize the existing ones, grow the material basis of social-cultural activities, as well as constituting the necessary resource for reserve and insurance. The process of capital accumulation forms the basis of capitalism, and is one of the defining characteristics of a capitalist economic system.

== Definition ==
In economics and accounting, capital accumulation is often equated with investment of profit income or savings, especially in real capital goods. The concentration and centralisation of capital are two of the results of such accumulation (see below).

Capital accumulation refers ordinarily to:

- Real investment in tangible means of production, such as acquisitions, research and development, etc. that can increase the capital flow.
- Investment in financial assets represented on paper, yielding profit, interest, rent, royalties, fees or capital gains.
- Investment in non-productive physical assets such as residential real estate or works of art that appreciate in value.

and by extension to:

- Human capital, i.e., new education and training increasing the skills of the (potential) labour force which can increase earnings from work.
- Social capital, i.e. the wealth and productive capacity that the people in a society hold in common, rather than as individuals or corporations.

Both non-financial and financial capital accumulation is usually needed for economic growth, since additional production usually requires additional funds to enlarge the scale of production. Smarter and more productive organization of production can also increase production without increased capital. Capital can be created without increased investment by inventions or improved organization that increase productivity, discoveries of new assets (oil, gold, minerals, etc.), the sale of property, etc.

In modern macroeconomics and econometrics the term capital formation is often used in preference to "accumulation", though the United Nations Conference on Trade and Development (UNCTAD) refers nowadays to "accumulation". The term is occasionally used in national accounts.

=== Measurement of accumulation ===
Accumulation can be measured as the monetary value of investments, the amount of income that is reinvested, or as the change in the value of assets owned (the increase in the value of the capital stock). Using company balance sheets, tax data and direct surveys as a basis, government statisticians estimate total investments and assets for the purpose of national accounts, national balance of payments and flow of funds statistics. Usually, the reserve banks and the Treasury provide interpretations and analysis of this data. Standard indicators include capital formation, gross fixed capital formation, fixed capital, household asset wealth, and foreign direct investment.

== Demand-led growth models ==
In macroeconomics, following the Harrod–Domar model, the savings ratio ($s$) and the capital coefficient ($k$) are regarded as critical factors for accumulation and growth, assuming that all saving is used to finance fixed investment. The rate of growth of the real stock of fixed capital ($K$) is:

$${{\Delta K} \over K} = {{{\Delta K} \over Y} \over {K \over Y}} = {s \over k }$$

where $Y$ is the real national income. If the capital-output ratio or capital coefficient ($k={K \over Y}$) is constant, the rate of growth of $Y$ is equal to the rate of growth of $K$. This is determined by $s$ (the ratio of net fixed investment or saving to $Y$) and $k$.

A country might, for example, save and invest 12% of its national income, and then if the capital coefficient is 4:1 (i.e. $4 billion must be invested to increase the national income by 1 billion) the rate of growth of the national income might be 3% annually. However, as Keynesian economics points out, savings do not automatically mean investment (as liquid funds may be hoarded for example). Investment may also not be investment in fixed capital (see above).

Assuming that the turnover of total production capital invested remains constant, the proportion of total investment which just maintains the stock of total capital, rather than enlarging it, will typically increase as the total stock increases. The growth rate of incomes and net new investments must then also increase, in order to accelerate the growth of the capital stock. Simply put, the bigger capital grows, the more capital it takes to keep it growing and the more markets must expand.

The Harrodian model has a problem of unstable static equilibrium, since if the growth rate is not equal to the Harrodian warranted rate, the production will tend to extreme points (infinite or zero production). The Neo-Kaleckians models do not suffer from the Harrodian instability but fails to deliver a convergence dynamic of the effective capacity utilization to the planned capacity utilization. For its turn, the model of the Sraffian Supermultiplier grants a static stable equilibrium and a convergence to the planned capacity utilization. The Sraffian Supermultiplier model diverges from the Harrodian model since it takes the investment as induced and not as autonomous. The autonomous components in this model are the Autonomous Non-Capacity Creating Expenditures, such as exports, credit led consumption and public spending. The growth rate of these expenditures determines the long run rate of capital accumulation and product growth.

== Marxist concept ==
Karl Marx borrowed the idea of capital accumulation or the concentration of capital from early socialist writers such as Charles Fourier, Louis Blanc, Victor Considerant, and Constantin Pecqueur. In Marx's critique of political economy, capital accumulation is the operation whereby profits are reinvested into the economy, increasing the total quantity of capital. Capital was understood by Marx to be expanding value; this is seen as a sum of capital, usually expressed in money, that is transformed through human labor into a larger value and extracted as profits. Here, capital is defined essentially as economic or commercial asset value that is used by capitalists to obtain additional value (surplus-value). This requires property relations which enable objects of value to be appropriated and owned, and trading rights to be established. Marx argued that capital has the tendency for concentration and centralization in the hands of richest capitalists.

According to Marxism during periods of stagnation in capitalism, the accumulation process is increasingly oriented towards investment on military and security forces, real estate, financial speculation, and luxury consumption. In that case, income from value-adding production will decline in favour of interest, rent and tax income, with as a corollary an increase in the level of permanent unemployment. Capital accumulation of the means of production in Marxist thought leads to the formation of the bourgeoisie.

"Accumulation of capital" sometimes also refers in Marxist writings to the reproduction of capitalist social relations (institutions) on a larger scale over time, i.e., the expansion of the size of the proletariat and of the wealth owned by the bourgeoisie. In the first volume of Das Kapital Marx had illustrated this idea with reference to Edward Gibbon Wakefield's theory of colonisation, and further refers to the "fetishism of capital" reaching its highest point with interest-bearing capital, because of how capital appeared to grow almost of its own accord.

The Marxist analysis of capital accumulation and the development of capitalism identifies systemic issues with the process that arise with expansion of the productive forces. A crisis of overaccumulation of capital occurs when the rate of profit is greater than the rate of new profitable investment outlets in the economy, arising from increasing productivity from a rising organic composition of capital (higher capital input to labor input ratio). This depresses the wage bill, leading to stagnant wages and high rates of unemployment for the working class while excess profits search for new profitable investment opportunities. Marx believed that this cyclical process would be the fundamental cause for the dissolution of capitalism and its replacement by socialism, which would operate according to a different economic dynamic. Anarchists hold that the state always maintains a form of capital accumulation to the elite, even in self proclaimed socialist states and that for true equality the state should be abolished.

== Effects ==
The effects of wealth accumulation results in increased savings for the individual. If economic growth is shared unevenly between different groups of the population wealth inequality emerges. Extreme wealth inequality can result in oligarchy, in which super rich individuals hold most power and money in society.

== See also ==
- Business cycle – Intervals of expansion and recession in economic activity
- Capitalist mode of production – Systems of organizing production and distribution within capitalist societies
- Charity (practice) – Voluntary giving of help to those in need
- Commodity fetishism – Concept in Marxist analysis
- Constant and variable capital – Capital invested in means of production
- Constant purchasing power accounting – Accounting model
- Culture of capitalism – Overview of the culture of a capitalist system
- Dual-sector model – Model in developmental economics
- History of capitalist theory
- Internal contradictions of capital accumulation
- Investment-specific technological progress – Investment in new equipment
- Matthew effect – The rich get richer and the poor get poorer
- Organic crisis – Scenario of complete instability of a system
- Preferential attachment – Stochastic process formalizing cumulative advantage
- Prices of production – Price levels at which goods and services must be sold
- Primitive socialist accumulation – Counterpart to the process of the primitive accumulation of capital
- Productive and unproductive labour – Concepts used in classical political economy
- Proletarianization – Social process of becoming a wage laborer
- Property income – Income received by virtue of owning property
- Relations of production – Concept in Marxism
- Return on capital – Measure of profitability relative to invested capital
- Simple commodity production – Concept in economic theory
- Social reproduction – Reproduction of social structures and systems
- Surplus value – Concept in economics
- The rich get richer and the poor get poorer – Aphorism due to Percy Bysshe Shelley
- Unearned income – Income gained through ownership of land and other monopoly
- Unequal exchange – Term in Marxist economics
- Value investing – Investment paradigm
