= Criticism of Marxism =

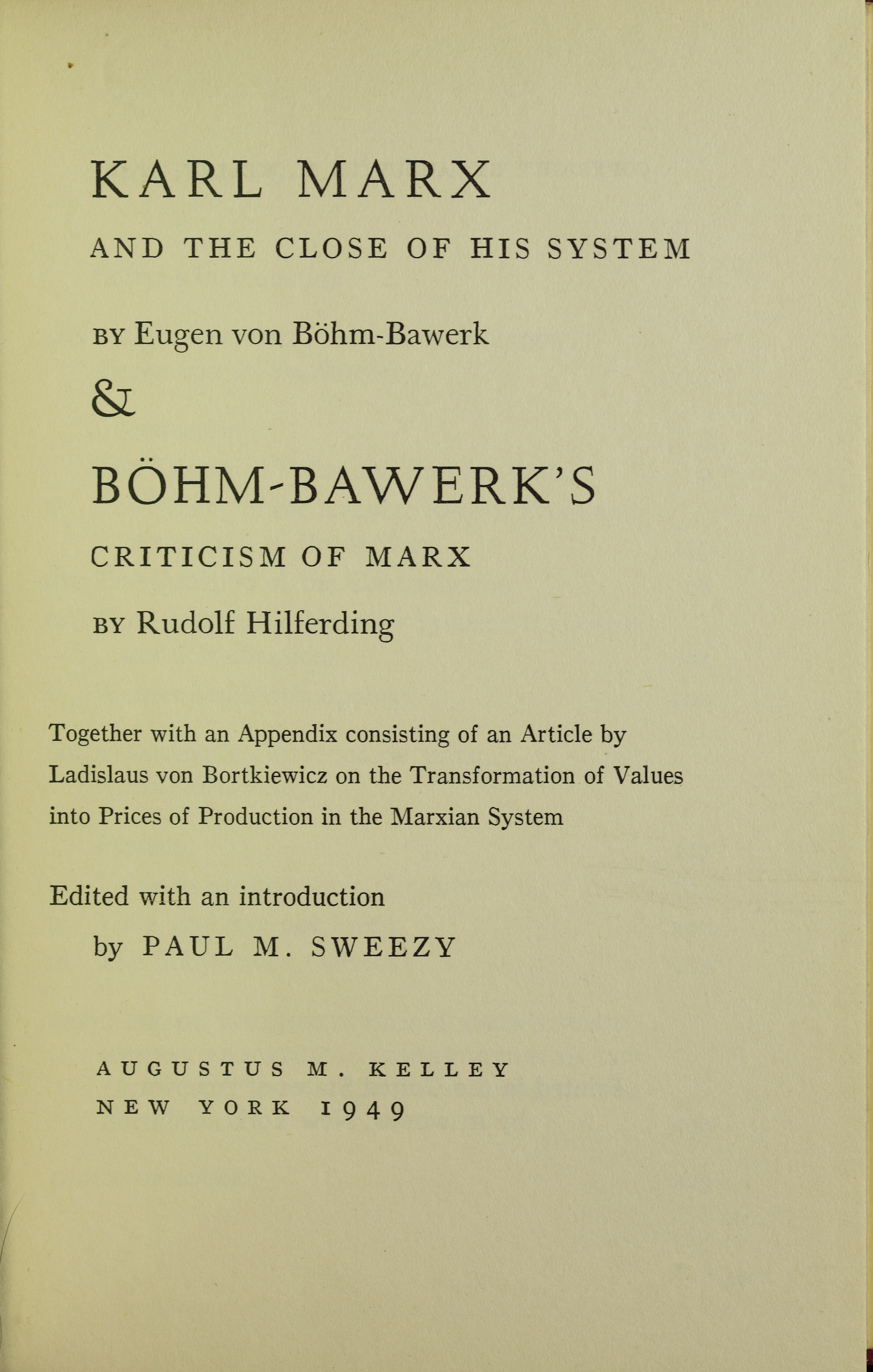
Karl Marx and the Close of His System is a book published in 1896 by the Austrian economist Eugen von Bohm-Bawerk, which represented one of the earliest detailed critiques of Marxism.

Criticism of Marxism has come from various political ideologies, campaigns and academic disciplines. This includes general intellectual criticism about dogmatism, a lack of internal consistency, criticism related to materialism (both philosophical and historical), arguments that Marxism is a type of historical determinism or that it necessitates a suppression of individual rights, issues with the implementation of communism and economic issues such as the distortion or absence of price signals and reduced incentives.

In addition, critics have raised empirical and epistemological concerns, arguing that Marxism relies on vague or unfalsifiable theories, resists refutation through dialectical reinterpretation, and has failed key predictions about capitalist collapse and socialist revolution.

== General criticism ==
Some democratic socialists and social democrats reject the idea that societies can achieve socialism only through class conflict and a proletarian revolution. Many anarchists reject the need for a transitory state phase. Some thinkers have rejected the fundamentals of Marxist theory, such as historical materialism and the labor theory of value and have gone on to criticize capitalism and advocate socialism using other arguments.

Some contemporary supporters of Marxism see many aspects of Marxist thought as viable, but contend that the corpus is incomplete or outdated in regard to certain aspects of economic, political or social theory. They may therefore combine Marxist concepts with the ideas of other theorists such as Max Weber—the Frankfurt School provides one example of this approach.

Paul Johnson in his 1988 book Intellectuals wrote that Marx "developed traits characteristic of a certain type of scholar, especially Talmudic ones: a tendency to accumulate immense masses of half-assimilated materials and to plan encyclopaedic works which were never completed; a withering contempt for all non-scholars; and extreme assertiveness and irascibility in dealing with other scholars. Virtually all his work, indeed, has the hallmark of Talmudic study: it is essentially a commentary on, a critique of the work of others in his field."

He continues: "The truth is, even the most superficial inquiry into Marx's use of evidence forces one to treat with skepticism everything he wrote which relies on factual data". For example, Johnson stated: "The whole of the key Chapter Eight of Capital is a deliberate and systematic falsification to prove a thesis which an objective examination of the facts showed was untenable".

Paul Johnson's criticism of Marx has itself been subject to criticism by Marxian economist Richard D. Wolff. In a 1991 academic paper, Wolff describes Johnson's book as "Criticism as malicious gossip [...] a right-wing tirade of rage is vented against left-wing social critics, intellectuals in general, Jews, women, and most of the others who compose the usual targets of such mentalities."

John Maynard Keynes described Marxism as being "founded upon nothing better than a misunderstanding of [David] Ricardo".

== Historical materialism ==
Historical materialism remains one of the bases of Marxism. It proposes that technological advances in modes of production inevitably lead to changes in the social relations of production. This economic "base" of society supports, is reflected by and influences the ideological "superstructure" which encompasses culture, religion, politics, and all other aspects of humanity's social consciousness. It thus looks for the causes of developments and changes in human history in economic, technological and, more broadly, material factors as well as the clashes of material interests among tribes, social classes, and nations. Law, politics, the arts, literature, morality and religion are understood by Marx to make up the superstructure as reflections of the economic base of society. Many critics have argued that this is an oversimplification of the nature of society and claim that the influence of ideas, culture and other aspects of what Marx called the superstructure are just as important as the economic base to the course of society, if not more so. However, Marxism does not claim that the economic base of society is the only determining element in society as demonstrated by the following letter written by Friedrich Engels, Marx's long-time contributor:

According to the materialist conception of history, the ultimately determining element in history is the production and reproduction of real life. More than this neither Marx nor I ever asserted. Hence if somebody twists this into saying that the economic element is the only determining one he transforms that proposition into a meaningless, abstract, senseless phrase.

According to critics, this also creates another problem for Marxism. If the superstructure also influences the base then there is no need for Marx's constant assertions that the history of society is one of economic class conflict. This then becomes a classic chicken or the egg argument as to whether the base or the superstructure comes first. Peter Singer proposes that the way to solve this problem is to understand that Marx saw the economic base as ultimately real. Marx believed that humanity's defining characteristic was its means of production and thus the only way for man to free himself from oppression was for him to take control of the means of production. According to Marx, this is the goal of history and the elements of the superstructure act as tools of history.

Marx held that the relationship between material base and ideological superstructure was a determination relation and not a causal relation. However, some critics of Marx have insisted that Marx claimed the superstructure was an effect caused by the base. For instance, Anarcho-capitalist Murray Rothbard criticized historical materialism by arguing that Marx claimed the "base" of society (its technology and social relations) determined its "consciousness" in the superstructure.

== Historical determinism ==
Marx's theory of history has been considered a variant of historical determinism linked to his reliance on dialectical materialism as an endogenous mechanism for social change. Marx wrote:

At a certain stage of development, the material productive forces of society come into conflict with the existing relations of production or – this merely expresses the same thing in legal terms – with the property relations within the framework of which they have operated hitherto. From forms of development of the productive forces these relations turn into their fetters. Then begins an era of social revolution. The changes in the economic foundation lead sooner or later to the transformation of the whole immense superstructure.

The concept of the dialectic first emerged from the dialogues of the ancient Greek philosophers, but it was revived by Georg Wilhelm Friedrich Hegel in the early 19th century as a conceptual framework for describing the often-opposing forces of historical evolution. Historical determinism has also been associated with scholars like Arnold Toynbee and Oswald Spengler, but in recent times this conceptual approach has fallen into disuse.

Terry Eagleton writes that Marx's writings "should not be taken to mean that everything that has ever happened is a matter of class struggle. It means, rather, that class struggle is most fundamental to human history".

Academic Peter Stillman believes Marx's status as a determinist is a "myth". Friedrich Engels himself cautioned against interpreting Marxism as strictly deterministic, emphasizing that while economic factors are foundational, they are not the sole forces shaping history. On another occasion, Engels remarked that "younger people sometimes lay more stress on the economic side than is due to it".

In an effort to reassert this approach to an understanding of the forces of history, Prabhat Ranjan Sarkar criticised what he considered the narrow conceptual basis of Marx's ideas on historical evolution. In the 1978 book The Downfall of Capitalism and Communism, Ravi Batra pointed out crucial differences in the historical determinist approaches of Sarkar and Marx:

Sarkar's main concern with the human element is what imparts universality to his thesis. Thus while social evolution according to Marx is governed chiefly by economic conditions, to Sarkar this dynamic is propelled by forces varying with time and space: sometimes physical prowess and high-spiritedness, sometimes intellect applied to dogmas and sometimes intellect applied to the accumulation of capital (p. 38). [...] The main line of defence of the Sarkarian hypothesis is that unlike the dogmas now in disrepute, it does not emphasise one particular point to the exclusion of all others: it is based on the sum total of human experience – the totality of human nature. Whenever a single factor, however important and fundamental, is called upon to illuminate the entire past and by implication the future, it simply invites disbelief, and after closer inspection, rejection. Marx committed that folly, and to some extent so did Toynbee. They both offered an easy prey to the critics, and the result is that today historical determinism is regarded by most scholars as an idea so bankrupt that it can never be solvent again.

== Suppression of individual rights ==
Various thinkers have argued that a communist state would by its very nature erode the rights of its citizens due to the postulated violent revolution and dictatorship of proletariat, its collectivist nature, reliance on "the masses" rather than individuals, historical materialism and centrally planned economy. These points have also been debated by various thinkers, who argue that we currently exist in a Dictatorship of the Bourgeoisie and that Marxism is not deterministic.

The American neoclassical economist Milton Friedman argued that the absence of a free market economy under socialism would inevitably lead to an authoritarian political regime. Friedman's view was shared by Friedrich Hayek, who also believed that capitalism is a precondition for freedom to flourish in a nation state. David Harvey has responded to such claims by suggesting that socialism enables individual freedom, stating that "the achievement of individual liberties and freedoms is, I argued, a central aim of such emancipatory projects. But that achievement requires collectively building a society where each one of us has adequate life chances and life possibilities to realize each one of our own potentialities." In contrast, Jonathan Chait writes that "Marxist governments trample on individual rights because Marxist theory does not care about individual rights. Marxism is a theory of class justice... Unlike liberalism, which sees rights as a positive-sum good that can expand or contract for society as a whole, Marxists (and other left-wing critics of liberalism) think of political rights as a zero-sum conflict. Either they are exercised on behalf of oppression or against it."

Anarchists have also argued that centralized communism would inevitably create coercion and state domination. Mikhail Bakunin believed Marxist regimes would lead to the "despotic control of the populace by a new and not at all numerous aristocracy". Even if this new aristocracy were to have originated from among the ranks of the proletariat, Bakunin argued that their new-found power would fundamentally change their view of society and thus lead them to "look down at the plain working masses".

== Economic ==
Marxian economics have been criticized for a number of reasons. Some critics point to the Marxian analysis of capitalism while others argue that the economic system proposed by Marxism is unworkable.

There are also doubts that the rate of profit in capitalism would tend to fall as Marx predicted. In 1961, Marxian economist Nobuo Okishio devised a theorem (Okishio's theorem) showing that if capitalists pursue cost-cutting techniques and if the real wage does not rise, the rate of profit must rise.

=== Labor theory of value ===
The labor theory of value is one of the most commonly criticized core tenets of Marxism.

The Austrian School argues that this fundamental theory of classical economics is false and prefers the subsequent and modern subjective theory of value put forward by Carl Menger in his book Principles of Economics. The Austrian School was not alone in criticizing the Marxian and classical belief in the labor theory of value. British economist Alfred Marshall attacked Marx, saying: "It is not true that the spinning of yarn in a factory [...] is the product of the labour of the operatives. It is the product of their labour, together with that of the employer and subordinate managers, and of the capital employed". Marshall points to the capitalist as sacrificing the money he could be using now for investment in business, which ultimately produces work. By this logic, the capitalist contributes to the work and productivity of the factory because he delays his gratification through investment. Through the law of supply and demand, Marshall attacked Marxian theory of value. According to Marshall, price or value is determined not just by supply, but by the demand of the consumer. Labor does contribute to cost, but so do the wants and needs of consumers. The shift from labor being the source of all value to subjective individual evaluations creating all value undermines Marx's economic conclusions and some of his social theories.

Shimshon Bichler and Jonathan Nitzan argue that most studies purporting to show empirical evidence of the labor theory of value often make methodological errors by comparing the total labor value to total price of multiple economic sectors, which results in a strong overall correlation but this is a statistical exaggeration; the authors argue that the correlations between labor value and price in each sector are often very small if not insignificant. Bichler and Nitzan also argue that because it is difficult to quantify a way to measure abstract labor, researchers are forced to make assumptions. However, Bichler and Nitzan argue these assumptions involve circular reasoning:

The most important of these assumptions are that the value of labour power is proportionate to the actual wage rate, that the ratio of variable capital to surplus value is given by the price ratio of wages to profit, and occasionally also that the value of the depreciated constant capital is equal to a fraction of the capital's money price. In other words, the researcher assumes precisely what the labour theory of value is supposed to demonstrate.

=== Distorted or absent price signals ===
The economic calculation problem is a criticism of socialist economics or, more precisely, of centralized socialist planned economies. It was first proposed by Austrian School economist Ludwig von Mises in 1920 and later expounded by Friedrich Hayek. The problem referred to is that of how to distribute resources rationally in an economy. The free market solution is the price mechanism, wherein people individually have the ability to decide how a good should be distributed based on their willingness to give money for it. The price conveys embedded information about the abundance of resources as well as their desirability which in turn allows on the basis of individual consensual decisions corrections that prevent shortages and surpluses. Mises and Hayek argued that this is the only possible solution and, without the information provided by market prices, socialism lacks a method to rationally allocate resources. The debate raged in the 1920s and 1930s and that specific period of the debate has come to be known by economic historians as the socialist calculation debate. In practice, socialist states like the Soviet Union used mathematical techniques to determine and set prices with mixed results.

=== Reduced incentives ===
Some critics of socialism argue that income sharing reduces individual incentives to work and therefore incomes should be individualised as much as possible. Critics of socialism have argued that in any society where everyone holds equal wealth there can be no material incentive to work because one does not receive rewards for work well done. They further argue that incentives increase productivity for all people and that the loss of those effects would lead to stagnation. In Principles of Political Economy (1848), John Stuart Mill said:

It is the common error of Socialists to overlook the natural indolence of mankind; their tendency to be passive, to be the slaves of habit, to persist indefinitely in a course once chosen. Let them once attain any state of existence which they consider tolerable, and the danger to be apprehended is that they will thenceforth stagnate; will not exert themselves to improve, and by letting their faculties rust, will lose even the energy required to preserve them from deterioration. Competition may not be the best conceivable stimulus, but it is at present a necessary one, and no one can foresee the time when it will not be indispensable to progress.

However, he later altered his views and became more sympathetic to socialism, particularly Fourierism, adding chapters to his Principles of Political Economy in defence of a socialist outlook and defending some socialist causes. Within this revised work, he also made the radical proposal that the whole wage system be abolished in favour of a co-operative wage system. Nonetheless, some of his views on the idea of flat taxation remained, albeit in a slightly toned-down form.

The economist John Kenneth Galbraith has criticised communal forms of socialism that promote egalitarianism in terms of wages or compensation as unrealistic in its assumptions about human motivation:

This hope [that egalitarian reward would lead to a higher level of motivation], one that spread far beyond Marx, has been shown by both history and human experience to be irrelevant. For better or worse, human beings do not rise to such heights. Generations of socialists and socially oriented leaders have learned this to their disappointment and more often to their sorrow. The basic fact is clear: the good society must accept men and women as they are.

Edgar Hardcastle responds to this by saying: "They want to work and need no more inducement than is given by the knowledge that work must be done to keep society going, and that they are playing their part in it along with their fellow men and women." He continues by criticising what he sees are the double standards of anti-socialists: "Notice how they object to the unemployed receiving a miserly dole without having to work, but never object to the millionaires (most of them in that position through inheritance) being able to live in luxurious idleness." Authors like Arnold Petersen argue that arguments such as these are inaccurate as hunter-gatherers practiced primitive communism without problems such as these.

=== Inconsistency ===
Vladimir Karpovich Dmitriev writing in 1898, Ladislaus von Bortkiewicz writing in 1906–1907 and subsequent critics have alleged that Karl Marx's value theory and law of the tendency of the rate of profit to fall are internally inconsistent. In other words, the critics allege that Marx drew conclusions that actually do not follow from his theoretical premises. Once those errors are corrected, Marx's conclusion that aggregate price and profit are determined by—and equal to—aggregate value and surplus value no longer holds true. This result calls into question his theory that the exploitation of workers is the sole source of profit.

The inconsistency allegations have been a prominent feature of Marxian economics and the debate surrounding it since the 1970s. Andrew Kliman argues that since internally inconsistent theories cannot possibly be right, this undermines Marx's critique of political economy and current-day research based upon it as well as the correction of Marx's alleged inconsistencies.

Critics who have alleged that Marx has been proved internally inconsistent include former and current Marxian and/or Sraffian economists, such as Paul Sweezy, Nobuo Okishio, Ian Steedman, John Roemer, Gary Mongiovi and David Laibman, who propose that the field be grounded in their correct versions of Marxian economics instead of in Marx's critique of political economy in the original form in which he presented and developed it in Capital.

Proponents of the temporal single system interpretation (TSSI) of Marx's value theory, like Kliman, claim that the supposed inconsistencies are actually the result of misinterpretation and argue that when Marx's theory is understood as "temporal" and "single-system", the alleged internal inconsistencies disappear. In a recent survey of the debate, Kliman concludes that "the proofs of inconsistency are no longer defended; the entire case against Marx has been reduced to the interpretive issue".

=== Relevance ===
Marxism has been criticized as irrelevant, with many economists rejecting its core tenets and assumptions. John Maynard Keynes referred to Capital as "an obsolete textbook which I know to be not only scientifically erroneous but without interest or application for the modern world". Keynes also wrote "I believe that the future will learn more from the spirit of Gesell than from that of Marx". According to George Stigler, "Economists working in the Marxian-Sraffian tradition represent a small minority of modern economists, and that their writings have virtually no impact upon the professional work of most economists in major English-language universities". In a review of the first edition of The New Palgrave Dictionary of Economics, Robert Solow criticized it for overemphasizing the importance of Marxism in modern economics:

Marx was an important and influential thinker, and Marxism has been a doctrine with intellectual and practical influence. The fact is, however, that most serious English-speaking economists regard Marxist economics as an irrelevant dead end.

A 2006 nationally representative survey of American professors found 3% of them identify as Marxists. The share rises to 5% in the humanities and is about 18% among social scientists.

== Social ==
Social criticism is based on the assertion that the Marxian conception of society is fundamentally flawed. The Marxist stages of history, class analysis and theory of social evolution have been criticised. Jean-Paul Sartre concluded that "class" was not a homogeneous entity and could never mount a revolution, but continued to advocate Marxist beliefs. According to the book Reflections on a Ravaged Century by the British historian Robert Conquest, Marx was unable to put the Asian society in the development stages of slave, feudal, capitalist, socialist, and as a result, Asian society where much of the world's population lived for thousand of years was "out of the balance".

== Democracy ==
While Karl Marx advocated for an increased democratic agency of citizens, some Marxist branches have been criticized for limiting democracy. Democratic centralism as internal organization structure of some Marxist parties has been criticized for prioritizing centralization over democracy.

== Epistemological ==
Arguments against Marxism are often based on epistemological reasoning. Specifically, various critics have contended that Marx or his adherents have a flawed approach to epistemology (i.e. the philosophy or theory of knowledge).

According to Leszek Kołakowski, the laws of dialectics at the very base of Marxism are fundamentally flawed: some are "truisms with no specific Marxist content", others "philosophical dogmas that cannot be proved by scientific means", yet others just "nonsense". Some Marxist "laws" are vague and can be interpreted differently, but these interpretations generally fall into one of the aforementioned categories of flaws as well. However, Marxist sociologist Ralph Miliband argued Kolakowski had a flawed understanding of Marxism and its relation to Leninism and Stalinism.

Kołakowski noted all of Marx's key predictions or forecasts were disproved in Marx's own lifetime or soon after. Specifically, Kołakowski identified five of Marx's core predictions that were falsified:

- First, that middle classes would quickly disappear under capitalism, when the middle class actually grew substantially.
- Second, Marx's prediction of "not only the relative but also the absolute impoverishment of the working class" was invalidated when working class living standards increased.
- Third, "and most importantly, Marx’s theory predicted the inevitability of the proletarian revolution. Such a revolution has never occurred anywhere."
- Fourth, "Marx’s prediction concerning the inevitable fall of the profit rate, a process that was supposed to lead ultimately to the collapse of the capitalist economy", when profits actually rose.
- Fifth, "the prediction that the market will hamper technical progress. The exact opposite has quite obviously proved to be the case."

Economist Thomas Sowell wrote in 1985:

What Marx accomplished was to produce such a comprehensive, dramatic, and fascinating vision that it could withstand innumerable empirical contradictions, logical refutations, and moral revulsions at its effects. The Marxian vision took the overwhelming complexity of the real world and made the parts fall into place, in a way that was intellectually exhilarating and conferred such a sense of moral superiority that opponents could be simply labelled and dismissed as moral lepers or blind reactionaries. Marxism was – and remains – a mighty instrument for the acquisition and maintenance of political power.

Many notable academics such as Karl Popper, David Prychitko, Robert C. Allen, and Francis Fukuyama argue that many of Marx's predictions have failed. Marx predicted that wages would tend to depreciate and that capitalist economies would suffer worsening economic crises leading to the ultimate overthrow of the capitalist system. The socialist revolution would be spontaneous uprisings from working class population, and would occur first in the most advanced capitalist nations and once collective ownership had been established then all sources of class conflict would disappear. Instead of Marx's predictions, communist revolutions were not spontaneous uprisings of the working class but led by revolutionaries and activists, took place in undeveloped regions in Latin America and Asia instead of industrialized countries like the United States or the United Kingdom.

In Conjectures and Refutations (1963), Popper wrote:

The Marxist theory of history, in spite of the serious efforts of some of its founders and followers, ultimately adopted this soothsaying practice. In some of its earlier formulations (for example in Marx's analysis of the character of the 'coming social revolution') their predictions were testable, and in fact falsified. Yet instead of accepting the refutations the followers of Marx re-interpreted both the theory and the evidence in order to make them agree. In this way they rescued the theory from refutation; but they did so at the price of adopting a device which made it irrefutable. They thus gave a 'conventionalist twist' to the theory; and by this stratagem they destroyed its much advertised claim to scientific status.

Popper believed that Marxism had been initially scientific, in that Marx had postulated a theory which was genuinely predictive. When Marx's predictions were not in fact borne out, Popper argues that the theory was saved from falsification by the addition of ad hoc hypotheses which attempted to make it compatible with the facts. By this means, a theory which was initially genuinely scientific degenerated into pseudoscientific dogma. Popper agreed on the general non-falsifiability of the social sciences, but instead used it as an argument against central planning and all-encompassing historiographical ideologies. Popper devoted much attention to dissecting the practice of using the dialectic in defence of Marxist thought, which was the very strategy employed by V.A. Lektorsky in his defence of Marxism against Popper's criticisms. Among Popper's conclusions was that Marxists used dialectic as a method of side-stepping and evading criticisms, rather than actually answering or addressing them:

Hegel thought that philosophy develops; yet his own system was to remain the last and highest stage of this development and could not be superseded. The Marxists adopted the same attitude towards the Marxian system. Hence, Marx's anti-dogmatic attitude exists only in the theory and not in the practice of orthodox Marxism, and dialectic is used by Marxists, following the example of Engels' Anti-Dühring, mainly for the purposes of apologetics – to defend the Marxist system against criticism. As a rule critics are denounced for their failure to understand the dialectic, or proletarian science, or for being traitors. Thanks to dialectic the anti-dogmatic attitude has disappeared, and Marxism has established itself as a dogmatism which is elastic enough, by using its dialectic method, to evade any further attack. It has thus become what I have called reinforced dogmatism.

Bertrand Russell has criticized as unscientific Marx's belief in progress as a universal law. Russell stated: "Marx professed himself an atheist, but retained a cosmic optimism which only theism could justify". Marxists like Thomas Riggins have claimed that Russell misrepresented Marx's ideas.

Murray Rothbard has criticized Marxism as resorting to quasi-religious epistemology in reaction to the failure of Marx's predictions.

== See also ==
- Anarchism and Marxism
- Criticism of communist states
- Criticism of socialism
- Transformation problem
