= Prices of production =

Price levels at which goods and services must be sold

Prices of production (or "production prices"; in German Produktionspreise) is a concept in Karl Marx's critique of political economy, defined as "cost-price + average profit". A production price can be thought of as a type of supply price for products; it refers to the price levels at which newly produced goods and services would have to be sold by the producers, in order to reach a normal, average profit rate on the capital invested to produce the products (not the same as the profit on the turnover).

The importance of these price levels is, that a lot of other prices are based on them, or derived from them: in Marx's theory, they determine the cost structure of capitalist production. The market prices of products normally oscillate around their production prices, while production prices themselves oscillate around product-values (the average current replacement cost in labour-time required to make each type of product).

This understanding already existed in classical political economy (the idea of market prices which gravitate to "natural prices" or "natural price levels") but, according to Marx, the political economists could not really explain adequately how production prices were formed, or how they could regulate the trade in commodities. In addition, the political economists could not theoretically reconcile their labour theory of value with value/price differentials, unequal profit/wage ratios and unequal capital compositions. Consequently, the labour theory of value of the political economists before Marx was more in the nature of a metaphysical belief, than a scientifically demonstrated proposition. If the belief persisted, that was because it made good sense of business practice - in an era where the owners of most enterprises also personally managed them (or were their directors), and therefore could observe the work and its results in daily life.

== Sources and context ==
The concept of production prices is introduced and elaborated systematically in chapter 9 et seq. of the third volume of Das Kapital, although it is already referred to in earlier texts by Marx. The first significant discussion occurs in the Grundrisse (1857–1858), followed by numerous references in Theories of Surplus Value (1862–1863), letters by Marx to Engels of 2 August 1862 and 30 April 1868 outlining his theory, the Resultate manuscript (1863–1866), Capital, Volume I (1867) and Capital, Volume II (1865–1877).

In Capital, Volume III, Marx considers the operation of capitalist production as the unity of a production process and a circulation process involving commodities, money, and capital. Capitalist production cannot exist without market sales, and therefore it is a type of production that fully depends on market trade. If there are no market sales, then value and surplus value cannot be realized as private profit. For the purpose of the analysis of the immediate process of capitalist production, which is the main subject of Capital, Volume I, successful market transactions are assumed and market fluctuations are initially mostly disregarded - but that gives only one half of the story. The products have to be sold at a profit, and purchased at a competitive price, through market trade and the circulation of capital. Otherwise the owners of capital do not make money.

The argument in Capital, Volume III (Marx intended to publish still more volumes, but did not manage to do so) is that the sales of newly produced commodities in the capitalist mode of production are regulated by their production prices. What products will sell for, has to do with what it normally costs to make them, plus the profit mark-up that will secure a normal average return on capital for the producing enterprise. For efficient producers, there will normally be a larger margin between their costs and their sales-revenue (more profit), and for less efficient producers, there will be a smaller margin between their costs and revenue (less profit). Marx's controversial claim is that the magnitude of the production prices for products is determined ultimately by their current replacement costs in average labour time, i.e. by the value of products.

A lot of the academic debate about Marx's concept of production prices is probably caused by the fact that Marx never finalized the text of the third volume of Capital for publication, although he drafted it before publishing the first and second volumes. The third volume, like the second one, was edited together posthumously by Friedrich Engels. Engels tried to make a polished story out of a mass of draft manuscripts Marx left behind. Marx sketched complicated issues in a shorthand way which is sometimes ambiguous and incomplete, and does not make all the implications explicit. According to the German Marxian scholar Michael Heinrich, "Marx was nowhere near solving all of the conceptual problems". However, Marx's concept of production prices is also frequently confused with similar concepts in other economic theories. For most economists, the concept of production prices corresponds roughly to Adam Smith's concept of "natural prices" and the modern neoclassical concept of long-term competitive equilibrium prices under constant returns to scale. Nevertheless, the function of prices of production within Marx's theory differs from both classical political economy and neoclassical economics.

== Basic explanation ==
A production price for outputs in Marx's sense always has two main components: the cost-price of producing the outputs (including the costs of materials and equipment used, operating expenses, and wages) and a gross profit margin (the additional value realized in excess of the cost-price, when goods are sold, which Marx calls surplus value).

Marx's argument is that price-levels for products are determined by input cost-prices, turnovers and average profit rates on output, which are in turn determined principally by aggregate labour-costs, the rate of surplus value and the growth rate of final demand. These price levels determine how much of the new output value that is created in excess of its cost price can actually be realized by enterprises as their gross profit.

The suggestion is, that the differences among most producers with regard to their profit rates on capital invested will tend to "level out" as a result of business competition, so that a general norm emerges for the profitability of industries.

=== Profit impost ===
In capitalist production, a basic profit impost is the normal precondition for the supply of goods and services. When competition for product markets intensifies, the producers' margin between cost prices and sale prices, their true income, shrinks. In that case, the producers can only maintain their profits, either by reducing their costs and improving productivity, or by capturing a bigger market share and selling more product in less time, or both (the only other option they can try is product differentiation). In a well-established product-market, however, the fluctuations in supply and demand are usually not very large.

This basic market logic was already well known by medieval merchant capitalists long before the dawn of the modern era in the 15th century. Medieval merchant houses could certainly estimate their own rate of surplus value and profit rate (the amount of (surplus-)labour required to yield a certain financial result or valorization) but they usually did not have so much knowledge about socially average profit rates; few relevant data or statistics were publicly available and a "general rate of profit" might not exist anyhow, for lack of an integrated national market for products and capital, and given the limited scope of industrialization.

=== Regulating prices ===
The regulating price of a given type of product is a sort of modal average price level, above or below which people would be much less likely to trade the product. If the price is too high, buyers cannot afford to buy it, or try to get cheaper alternatives. If the price is too low, sellers cannot cover their costs and make a profit. So normally there is a limited range of prices within which the product can be traded, with upper and lower bounds.

The production price then refers basically to the "normal or dominant price level" for a type of product that prevails during a longer interval of time. It presupposes that both the inputs and the outputs of production are priced goods and services—that is, that production is fully integrated in fairly sophisticated market relations enabling a sum of capital invested into it to be transformed into a larger sum of capital. In pre-capitalist economies, this was not the case; many inputs and outputs of production were not priced.

Marx's claim is that the production prices of products themselves are fundamentally determined by the comparative labour requirements of those products, and therefore are constrained by the law of value. Since, however, not all goods are produced or reproducible goods, not all goods have production prices. A production price in Marx's sense can exist only in markets developed sufficiently for a "normal" rate of profit on production capital invested to become the ruling average for a group of producers.

=== Dynamics ===
Substantively, Marx argues that the prices of new products sold will, assuming free competition for an open market, tend to settle at an average level that enables at least a "normal" rate of profit on the capital invested to produce them, and, as a corollary, that if such a socially average rate of profit cannot be reached, it is much less likely that the products will be produced at all (because of comparatively unfavourable profitability conditions). Marx defines the "general rate of profit" as the (weighted) average of all the average profit rates in different branches of production - it is a "grand average" profit rate on production capital. The simplest indicator of this rate is obtained by dividing an estimate of total surplus value in the economy by the estimated total production capital employed (S/(C+V)).

According to Marx's theory, investment capital is likely to shift out of production activities where the rate of profit is low and toward activities where profitability is higher; the "leading" sectors of industry are those where profitability is highest (today, these are mainly in the production of computer facilities & hi-tech, healthcare, oil products and finance which serve the richer strata of the world population). In 2024, the most dynamic growth industries were expected to be in the areas of computer hardware and software, all kinds of commercial digitalized services, (bio-)pharmaceuticals, electronic machinery and electronic equipment. In these sectors, investments are proportionally the highest, there is a lot of innovation and competition, and profits are generally high.

The precondition to investment for higher profits is the mobility of capital and labour. Thus, there is a systemic tendency to remove all the obstacles that prevent investors from investing in sectors where profits are higher. If, for any reason, the free movement of capital is blocked or restricted, large differences in the profit rates of enterprises are likely to occur. In general, the trajectory of capitalist development is determined by the industries where the profits are the best, because their products are in high demand, because of special production or market advantages, etc.

According to Marx, the movements of different production prices relative to one another importantly affect how the total "cake" of new surplus value produced is distributed as profit among competing capitalist enterprises. They are the basis of the competitive position of the producers, since they fundamentally determine profit yields relative to costs.

=== "Natural" prices ===
Some writers argue that Marx's production price is similar, or performs the same theoretical function, as the "natural prices" of classical political economy found, for example, in the writings of Adam Smith and David Ricardo (though the concept of natural prices is much older). This is the orthodox Marxist view, based on quotations where Marx says that his concept of production prices recalls the classical idea of natural prices. In this case, Marx's production price would be essentially a "centre of gravity" around which prices for outputs in a competitive market will fluctuate in the long run (cf. Fred Moseley's view).

This is an interpretation within the framework of equilibrium economics, which suggests that production prices are really a kind of "equilibrium prices". It can be supported with some textual evidence, insofar as Marx sometimes defines the production price as the price that would apply if the supply and demand for products were balanced. At other times, he refers to a "long-term average price" or a "regulating price". He does not say precisely how these three different concepts are related.

The main objection against equating production prices with natural prices is that Marx's concept of production prices is precisely a critique of the "natural prices". Support for this interpretation can be found in Capital, Volume I, where Marx criticizes and ridicules the concept of a "natural price of labour" - this concept, he argues, rests on confusions of several different economic categories. Similarly, in Capital, Volume III, Marx rejects the concept of a "natural" interest rate, arguing that what this really refers to is just the interest rate that results out of free competition. According to this argument, there is actually nothing "natural" about the allegedly "natural" prices - they are socially determined effects of capitalist production and trade. More importantly, the existence of production prices does not logically depend on, or presuppose, an equilibrium state.

If the classical economists talked about the "naturalness" of price-levels, this was ultimately a theoretical apologism; they could not reconcile their labour theory of value with the theory of the distribution of capital. They assumed a market balance, without proving how it could exist.

The general theory behind the concept of natural prices was that the free play of markets would, through successive adjustments in the trading process, "naturally" converge on price levels at which sellers could cover their costs and make a normal profit, while buyers could afford to buy products; with the effect, that relative labour requirements would be genuinely proportional to relative prices. Yet classical political economy provided no credible theory of how this process could actually occur. Since it confused and conflated the value of labour power with the price of labour, commodity values with their production prices, and surplus value with profit, i.e. because it mixed up values and prices, it could in the end explain the normal price levels of commodities only as "natural" market phenomena.

=== Observables and unobservables ===
In the sphere of capitalist production, Marx argues, commodity values are inferred variables which are not directly observable. That is why people often think that commodity values (as distinct from prices observable as price tags or account entries) don't exist. Product values are indirectly observable only as "average price-levels" across longer intervals of time (e.g. ten years). More specifically, commodity values observably appear as supply prices or as prices of production calculated for outputs, which are established jointly by average input costs and by the ruling profit margins applying to outputs sold. This is an effect of the establishment of regular, developed market trade; the production price averages reflect the fact that production has become totally integrated into relatively stable circuits of commodity trade, in which capital accumulation has become the dominant motive.

What prices of production simultaneously hide, Marx argues, is the social nature of the valorization process — that is, how exactly an increase in capital value has occurred through production. The direct connection between labour time and value, still visible in simple commodity production, is largely effaced; only cost prices and sale prices remain, and it seems that any of the factors of production (which Marx calls the "Holy Trinity" of capitalism) can contribute new value to output, paving the way for the concept of the production function.

== Problems of interpretation ==
=== Ten different types of production prices ===
The first interpretative difficulty concerns the existence of various different types of production prices. For more than a century, almost all Marxists, Sraffians and Post-Keynesians simply took Marx's concept of production prices for granted, as being more or less the same as Smith's and Ricardo's "natural price" idea (that is how it was taught, and presented in textbooks), and they did not inquire into the concept in precise detail. They believed, that the idea of a production price was simple, obvious and not controversial. They ignored the business-to-business and producer-to-consumer supply chains. So they missed altogether the fact that in Capital, Volume III Marx referred to different types of production prices:

- the private or enterprise production price which forms the starting-point of the analysis in the first chapter. This price equals the cost-price and normal (average) profit on production capital invested which applies to the new output of a specific enterprise when this output is sold by the enterprise (the "individual production price"). The rate of profit involved in this production price can be compared to the average rate of profit that obtains for a sector or for the whole economy.
- the sectoral production price. This price equals the cost-price and average profit rate on production capital invested which applies to the output of a commodity produced by a specific industry, sector or branch of production (at "producer's prices"). This is the production price which applies for a particular type or class of product, reflecting the average return the producers can normally expect to obtain in the given sector. In his discussion of ground rent, Marx notes especially the differences between industrial and agricultural production prices. The suggestion is that there is a structural, long-term difference between the average profit rates applying to different sectors of production.
- the inter-sectoral production price. This price-level refers to the sale of output at producers' prices which reflect an average profit rate on a quantity of capital invested that applies to various sectors of industry. This is the fully formed industrial production price which Marx most often has in mind in his theoretical discussions of the equalisation process of profit rates; it reflects the producer's product-price at which the average rate of profit on production capital applying to a whole economic community is obtained (for example, a net return of 10%).
- the so-called real price of production, which Marx himself defines as the price of production for the commodity produced and sold by an industry plus commercial profit on re-selling the commodity (warehousing, distribution and retailing etc.).
- the so-called market production price. "This production price... is determined not by the individual cost price of any one industrialist producing by himself, but rather by the price that the commodity costs on average under the average conditions for capital in that whole sphere of production. It is in fact the market price of production; the average market price as distinct from its oscillations." This is roughly the same as what we would nowadays call the "average unit cost" of a product.
- the economic production price. This price, a total cost-price (i.e. a replacement cost) equals the average cost price and average profit rate of an output at the point of sale to the final consumer, including all net costs incurred by all the different enterprises participating in its production (factory, storage, transport, packaging etc.), plus tax imposts, insurance levies, incidental costs etc. In modern times, "costing" production in order to establish the expected yield on capital invested in it often involves assessing the whole value chain relative to the price level at which products can be sold to the final consumer. The question then is, how can the whole production of a product - from the factory gate to the final consumer - be organized so that it can sell to the final consumer at a price that the market will bear - and still make a good profit? Marx sometimes implies an "economic production price" when, for the sake of argument, he simply abstracts from everything that happens between the factory gate and the final consumer of a commodity.

To these six types of production prices, Marxist economists sometimes add national and international production prices, calculated according to the averages of national profit rates and global profit rates. However, the validity of the concept of international production prices has also been disputed. It has been argued that, even if there exist unified global market prices for many products, there exists in reality no global levelling-out of differences in profit rates through global business competition. Therefore, there exist no meaningful average global profit rates or true global production prices. Nevertheless indications exist which suggest that international production prices are emerging more and more in the world market. Additionally there is also the concept of production prices which prevail in regions within nations or across nations, and the concept of truly global production prices, in contrast to international production prices which prevail only in a group of countries.

These ten possible types of production prices are revealed when we study the composition of the cost structure of a product at different stages and levels of its production and supply. One source of interpretive difficulty is that Marx often assumes in his shorthand drafts that these different kinds of prices all refer to the same thing. But that is true only in the special case where one enterprise sells directly to the final consumer. The reason for this conflation is probably that Marx's real analytical concern was not really with the pricing processes as such, but with the main factors influencing the realisation and distribution of new surplus-value produced, when sales occur. After all, his argument was that competition in capitalism revolves around the quest of obtaining maximum surplus-value from production in the form of generic profit income (profit, interest, rent). The question was: how does a sum of capital invested in production get transformed into a larger sum of capital? What are the dynamics and overall results of that process? What are the implications for the process of economic reproduction?

The existence of different types of production prices implies a much more complex picture than Marx initially provides in his discussion of the leveling out of differences in profit rates through price competition. Thus, for example, in his discussion of ground rent, Marx claims that farm products can be persistently sold for more than their price of production, but below their value, while many manufactured products obtain their price of production only because they are sold for more than their value. In Marx's more developed theory of the circulation of commodities, the values of products, their prices of production and their market prices are all semi-autonomous variables which can both diverge and converge, through constant market fluctuations, affecting the profitability of enterprises. Nevertheless, Marx claims they will mostly tend to converge in the long term.

=== Oversimplification in the model ===
A second source of interpretive difficulty is that in his draft manuscript Marx often conflates (1) capital advanced (to acquire inputs necessary for production) with (2) capital in use and with (3) capital consumed (the fraction of the value of inputs used up in the production of new output). In his simplified quantitative examples, he just assumes very abstractly, for the sake of argument, that:

- the value of output created, equals the sum of capital advanced plus surplus value.
- the sum of input costs incurred in producing output (the cost price) is equal to the production capital advanced.
- fixed capital advanced is equal to fixed capital consumed, i.e. there is no depreciation of fixed capital.
- All output is sold at once, there is no problem with selling anything.
- There are no variations in the turnover of capital.
- The rate of surplus value is always uniform across all sectors.
- The rate of profit on production capital is uniform across all sectors.
- There are no obstructions to the free movement of labor and capital.

Most probably the reason was that his real interest was in the overall dynamics of capital accumulation, competition, and the realisation of surplus value produced, assuming output would sell. He was thinking of grand averages and overall results. The simplified picture does not obtain in reality, among other things because, as Marx himself notes, capitalist competition turns on buying commodities below their value and selling them above their value (or to sell commodities below their value at a good profit, with a high turnover, whhich drives competitors out of business).

Marx's theory is frequently confused with input-output economics and the marginalist theory of capital, in which total inputs and total outputs are always exactly equal in value, an equality accomplished by treating the factor income which is gross profit as an input, so that profit is both a cost and a revenue at the same time. Marx did not talk about inputs and outputs in this double-entry bookkeeping sense, where the source of funds balances against the use of funds; instead, he was concerned with how a sum of capital was transformed into a larger sum of capital through a net addition of new value created by workers in production. He was not really talking about quantities of input commodities and quantities of output commodities, but about quantities of capital required for commodity production and quantities of capital created by commodity production.

If indeed the value of commodities bought for production was exactly equal to the value of produced commodities sold, capitalists would not even invest in production, because they would get no profit out of it. Their income would be offset exactly by their costs, yielding a zero net gain. So from Marx's point of view, input-output economics really mystified the "capital-relationship", i.e. the ability of the bourgeoisie to capitalize on the surplus labour of the workforce in virtue of its ownership of the means of production (in chapter 48 of Capital, Volume III, he refers satirically to the factors of production theory as the "holy trinity" of political economy).

=== Theoretical status of production prices ===
A third source of interpretive difficulty concerns the question of what kinds of prices production prices really are. Do these prices really exist, and if so, in what way? Or are they only theoretical or ideal prices? What exactly is the "average" an "average" of? What does the "cost-price" really refer to, and at what point in the process (inputs purchased, output produced before sales, output sold)? Marx talks about production prices variously as:

- theoretical output prices which are equilibrium prices that would apply, if supply and demand are equal or balanced (this equilibrium could be thought of as a simple market balance, or as some kind of system equilibrium or dynamic equilibrium - where market prices gravitate towards or oscillate around some underlying value or natural price).
- regulating price levels of market prices for products which function as norms for trade, setting upper and lower bounds for market-price fluctuations around an axis or level according to current labour requirements for their supply. The idea here is that commodities will sell within a certain price range, but fail to sell outside that price range (if the selling price is too low, the supplier has no net income, and if the price is too high, consumers will not buy it, and look for alternatives).
- empirical price averages for products sold across a longer time-interval, obtained by averaging out actual output prices for several accounting intervals.

Consequently, it remains somewhat ambiguous in what way such prices exist in reality. The conceptual challenge in modelling is to show how these three variables are related. It could, in principle, also be argued that some types of production prices are empirical price averages, while other ones only express theoretical price-levels. Obviously, if production prices are regarded only as purely "theoretical" entities, then it is not possible to claim also that they really regulate actual prices. A price level which exists only in theory, and not in reality, cannot be said to determine real price-levels (other than in the sense of publicly available price information influencing market expectations).

The problem with the popular Newtonian metaphor of production prices as "centres of gravity", or alternatively the stochastic metaphor of production prices as "attractors" of market prices (both used in econophysics), is that they do not provide any causal explanation of how the "gravitation" or "attraction" process actually occurs in the real world, as a social process. The meaning of the metaphors keeps slip-sliding between empirical price-levels, theoretical price-levels and regulating price-levels. The "gravitation" could be interpreted as an actual physical process, an empirical stochastic result, or a purely theoretical description. Whatever the case, it must be explained how the gravitation process actually occurs. "Price-numbers" ultimately cannot substitute for a realistic ontology of prices and a realistic explanation of price structures.

In grappling with these issues, it must also be remembered that when Marx lived there was little macro-economic statistical data available that would enable theoretical hypotheses to be tested and relativised. Marx had deduced the motions of capital essentially from an enormous amount of economic literature he read, plus available commercial and government statistics. When, towards the end of his life, he toyed with the idea of investigating economic fluctuations econometrically, Samuel Moore convinced him this was not possible, because relevant economic data and mathematical tools did not exist yet. In an 1894 editorial comment, Friedrich Engels stated that, so far, only the US Census had provided aggregate data on profits earned and wages paid; one could perhaps estimate from that source an average rate of surplus value, but not the organic composition of capital or other macro-economic capital ratios. Although the available data was valuable to have, Engels doubted its reliability, since it was based on unchecked reports supplied by businessmen. Comprehensive official macro-economic data became available only half a century later.

Marx had pointed the way to solving the problems raised by the classical political economists, without however providing a complete answer. He really believed though that a "general rate of industrial profit", applying economy-wide to all industries, would be formed (at least in the sense of the minimally acceptable profit rate that is the bottom line for the average business operation) but in truth he lacked the data to prove it. He did not discuss in any detail the difference between distributed and undistributed profit, or tax requirements, and how this might affect profit statements. His discussion was limited to physical capital and labour employed, abstracting from ancillary costs and incomes unrelated to production which enterprises usually have (including tax imposts and subsidies), asset transactions, and changes in market prices.

== Production prices and the transformation problem ==
The concept of production prices is one "building block" in Marx's theory of "the tendency of differences between rates of profit on production capital to level out through competition" which aimed to tackle a theoretical problem left unsolved by David Ricardo. This problem concerned the question of explaining how an average or "normal" return on production capital invested (e.g. 8%, 10% or 16%) could become established, so that capitals of equal size reaped equal profits, even although the enterprises differed in capital compositions and amounts of labour performed (see labor theory of value) and consequently generated different amounts of new value.

Intuitively, if the labour theory of value is true, then firms which use more labour to produce products would also create more value, and receive bigger profits. In reality, it is just the other way round: more efficient firms which use less labour to produce products receive bigger profits.

According to Marx, this was not simply a logical problem, a social accounting problem or theoretical problem, but a structural contradiction intrinsic to the capitalist mode of production, which had to be continually mediated. The fact that more or less value could be appropriated by investors from the labour-efforts of the workers employed, and thus that different labour efforts were unequally rewarded, was in his eyes central to the competitive process - in which the norms of labour effort continually clashed with the norms of profitability.

On the surface, it looked to the individual observer as if profit yields on capital determine expenditures on labour, but in aggregate, it is—according to Marx—just the other way around, since the volume of labour-time worked determined how much profit could be distributed among producing capitalists, via the sales of their products. The mass of surplus labour performed in the sphere of production set a limit for the mass of surplus value that could be distributed as profit in the sphere of circulation.

=== Accounting interpretation ===
In some interpretations of the Marxian transformation problem, total "(production) prices" for output must equal total "values" by definition, and total profits must by definition equal total surplus value. However, Marx himself explicitly denied in chapter 49 of the third volume of Das Kapital that such an exact mathematical identity actually applies. As soon as synchronic and diachronic variability in labour productivity is admitted, then the two famous identities cannot be true even in theory. At best, the two identities are an assumption used in modelling, which is justified if - as Marx believed - the quantitative divergence between total values, total production prices and market prices is ordinarily not very great, because actual labour expenditures and market competition constrain their divergence. But all this has never bothered neo-classical scholars such as Paul Samuelson in their interpretation of what Marx tried to do. Subsequently, Friedrich Engels emphasized in this regard that an idealization of reality is not the same thing as reality itself, in a letter to Conrad Schmidt dated March 12, 1895.

Logically, the only way Marx has to express an identity of aggregated output prices and aggregated output values, is to say that both of the totals are equal to exactly the same quantity of abstract labour time, or a quantity of gold. But this equivalence is only asserted "by definition." In the real world, there exist no causal forces that could guarantee such an exact match. Moreover, the identity cannot be empirically proved in any direct way, since to find the quantitative relationship between labour-time and value, a relationship between labour-time and money must already be assumed.

The "accounting" interpretation of production prices (value/price identity at the macro-level) by economists, according to which price distributions and value distributions can be inferred from each other, would suggest that the production price is empirically obtained from a straightforward statistical averaging of aggregated cost prices and profits. In that case, the production price is a theoretical midpoint which fluctuating actual prices would match exactly only by exception.

=== Production prices as dominant price-levels ===
In another interpretation, however, the production price reflects only an empirical output price-level which dominates in the market for that output (a "norm" applying to a branch of production or economic sector, which producers cannot escape from). That is, the prevailing value proportions and necessary labour requirements set a range or band within which product-prices will move. In practice, that means simply that there exists a minimum sale price at which a commodity can be viably and profitably produced; if it is not possible to sell a product at that price, it is unlikely that it will be produced at all (the maximum price level is the price beyond which there are not enough buyers to realize a turnover at which production is profitable).

==== Shaikh ====
Borrowing an idea from Michio Morishima, Anwar Shaikh modelled the formation and change of production prices mathematically using iterative methods to show a convergence of prices and values. Iterative methods to study price formation and price changes mathematically were first used by Georg von Charasoff in 1910, and subsequently developed by Kei Shibata, Nobuo Okishio, András Bródy, and Kenji Mori.

Subsequently, Anwar Shaikh concretized the concept of the production price as the "regulating price" dominating the market for a type of product, using the notion of "regulating capitals".

==== Machover ====
Emmanuel Farjoun and Moshe Machover (1984) reject the whole idea that a "uniform rate of profit" would ever exist in reality, contrary to Marx's suggestion that competition would tend to establish at least a minimally "acceptable" average rate of profit on production capital invested to produce outputs, and returns proportional to capital size. Machover consequently rejects the concept of production prices as a useless concept. He argues:

"...if you assume that each commodity has a unique price of production and that, when all commodities are sold and bought at these prices, the rate of profit is uniform across the whole economy, then this rate of profit (in money terms) turns out in general to be different from r (the global rate of profit in value terms). Alternatively, you can ‘force’ the uniform rate of profit in the equations to be equal to r, but then the price-profit equations do not balance: you get one ‘price of production’ for a given type of commodity when it is bought as input, and a different ‘price of production’ for the very same type of commodity when it is sold as output. In my opinion, this makes the notion of price of production quite arbitrary and devoid of explanatory power."

==== Kliman ====
Supporters of the Temporal Single System Interpretation, such as Andrew Kliman, believe that Machover's inequality does not really arise, since, if Marx is read correctly, there is no necessity for the value of total inputs to be equal to the value of total outputs, or for inputs and outputs to be valued simultaneously.

It is certainly true that transactions can be "simultaneous": buyer and seller can get their money or goods at the same time, in what is known as an "arms-length transaction". But the same is not true for production. You cannot produce an output before you have got an input, and once you have bought an input, it takes time to produce an output, which becomes an input to the next cycle of production. The new output is not reducible to the sum of inputs, because it is a new use-value to which new value has been added by living labor. Once the output has been produced and sold, a production price (or a unit cost price) can be fixed "after the fact". However, such a price is based on the preceding capital outlays which are fixed only after the output has been produced (or once the product is produced and sold), plus the profit mark-up. This price usually cannot change later (at least not very significantly, in the ordinary situation). This temporal dimension of production is one of the important reasons why most business operations necessarily make use of credit money, as Marx explains in Capital, Vol. 2 when he discusses the turnover of capital.

That aside, in practice it is not really true that every commodity has a uniquely formed production price, as Machover suggests. At best one could say that a particular type of commodity (for example, a good quality vacuum cleaner) exhibits a normal, average production price (or a normal price range). The production price usually applies to the capital value of the whole new output being sold, on which a profit rate is calculated. The producer of a good or service obtains a quarterly or annual gross revenue, from which he deducts his costs to obtain the profit volume, and relates this profit to the capital invested to obtain a rate of return (the yield of the investment).

The profit or surplus value component of an individual commodity is rarely in equal proportion to the total profit on the total turnover of that type of commodity. If, for example, the total gross profit mark-up in the unit-cost structure of a packet of butter at the point of sale to the consumer is (say) 45%, that does not mean that the profit rate on the total production capital of the butter producer equals 45%. The butter producer would need to produce and sell a gigantic amount of butter in a very short time, to obtain such a high profit rate on his output.

McKinsey analysts found that for every $1.00 of operating profit on consumer goods sold in the US in 2008, retailers collected a profit of about $0.31 (down from $0.60 in 1999) while the suppliers, packagers, and others along the value chain behind retail received $0.69. To obtain the same profit as before, fewer retail outlets have to sell many more products, in a shorter time-span. This can lead among other things to the phenomenon of food deserts. The long-term effect is a gigantic process of economic concentration, in which the largest retail corporations such as Amazon and Walmart have workforces of circa 1.5 million and 2 million employees respectively (which will likely be reduced under the impact of automation using artificial intelligence).

=== Statics and dynamics ===
At the beginning of Capital, Volume III, Marx provides a clue to how he thinks the "transformation problem" is solved in reality. He implies that it can be solved only by examining capital and profit distributions as a dynamic process, rather than statically. His argument is, that what industrial competition really revolves around, is principally the difference between the value of the new commodities produced, and their cost-prices, i.e. the potential surplus-value (the trading gain) which can be realized from them. There are constant disparities in space and time between labour-expenditures and capital returns, and between surplus-value produced and profit realized, but also just as constant attempts to overcome or take advantage of those disparities. Thus, unrestricted economic competition has the result that the law of value regulates the trade in newly produced commodities: the ultimate limits of what products will trade for, i.e. their supply price, are set by comparative costs in labour-time.

==== Assumptions ====
In the real world,

- a uniform rate of profit and a uniform rate of surplus value for all industries do not exist in reality, except in the sense of a minimum acceptable rate of profit or a baseline productivity level (below which an enterprise is likely to go out of business, if it cannot better its capital costs and/or improve sales).
- The agents of capital do not aim simply to reach the average rate of profit, but an above-average rate of profit (the maximum profit, or a "surplus profit").
- The rate of surplus value, the turnover time of capital and the productivity of labour can vary among different producers, and across production periods.
- The migration of labor and capital may be restricted by technical, logistical, legal or political factors.
- Competition is not a "level playing field", but a process in which unequally positioned capitalists try to obtain or maintain extra profits, including the blocking of competitors in various ways to improve their own market position. This process can be fairly benign and legal, but can also become vicious and criminal, and lead to outright war.
- the relationship between product-values and product-prices is expressible mathematically only in probabilistic (stochastic) terms, not as a neat-and-tidy simultaneous equation based on accounting identities.
- total capital consumed diverges from total capital advanced, and total capital advanced is larger than total physical production capital, just as the gross business income after costs is typically greater than the profit component of the new value added.
- since the production price refers only to the cost prices and profit yields for newly produced outputs, the current production price can be definitely calculated only after (or on the assumption that) the newly produced output is sold, and when the total turnover is known.

==== Competition dynamics ====
When Marx created a simplified, abstract model of profit distributions, he was not primarily trying to prove that the two famous identities (total profit=total surplus value, and total product value=total production price) are compatible with price-value divergences and with profit distributions according to capital employed (to the contrary: for analytical purposes, Marx assumes that they are compatible, knowing very well that his model was only an idealization). Instead, he was trying to model the basic parameters of business competition for a share of the new surplus-value from the products produced by the working class. By identifying what the business competition is ultimately about, Marx was able to explain both what really motivates the business owners, and why the surface appearance of the business process perceived by an individual at the micro-level is almost the exact inverse of the macro-economic process in society as a whole.

== Value and price ==
Much criticism of Marx's concept originates from the ambiguities referred to earlier. Consequently, many of the criticisms can, according to some Marxists, be dispelled simply by a more exact definition of the cost, product and revenue aggregates used, and of the timing of transactions (see e.g. Temporal Single System Interpretation).

=== Ambiguities ===
In doing so, it must be admitted though that Marx's draft manuscript often shows sloppy use of terminology and concepts, and that Marx's purpose was often not fully explicit. At a high level of abstraction, he moves very easily and cavalierly from values to prices and back again, and restricts his discussion of "capital invested" to intermediate goods, fixed capital and labour power only.

- Sometimes the transformation is portrayed as being only a quantitative change, but sometimes also as a qualitative change.
- Sometimes he suggests the transformation is a change from one form of value to another, at other times that there is a transition from value-form to price form.
- Sometimes the suggestion is, that a price category fully replaces a value category, at other times both categories always co-exist, and require each other, so that production prices can adjust to product-values but product-values can also adjust to production prices.
- Sometimes the transformation from value to production price is presented as a logical development, at other times the production price is presented as an irrational expression.
- Sometimes the production price is presented as an observable category, and at other times as a hidden regulator of market prices.
- Sometimes the transformation is presented as an historical process, at other times as a logical process, or as a conceptual (or epistemic) transition.
- Sometimes the sum total of production prices is equated with the sum total of product-values, while at other times it is asserted or implied that these cannot be equal.

It never becomes quite clear how exactly these different ideas can all be easily reconciled, which makes it difficult for academics to understand the intention of Marx's theory. Quite likely Marx would have ironed out inconsistencies if he had prepared his own draft for publication, but he did not do so, leaving his readers with important issues of interpretation.

=== Valorization and realization ===
In Marx's view, a capitalist production process was a valorisation process in which new value was formed. The theoretical problem was, that this value-forming process - the process vital for capital accumulation - took place mainly external to the market, being bracketed by the transactions M-C (purchase of inputs, C, using money, M) and C'-M' (sales of new output, C', for more money, M'). Between the successive exchanges, however, economic value was conserved, transferred and added to. Management then tried to estimate the cost and profit implications of different tasks and activities in production for the growth of capital, without full certainty of results.

But in that case, the domains of product-values and product-prices, and consequently the domains of value relations and price relations, were separate but co-existing and overlapping domains (unless one is willing to argue that goods have an economic value only at the point where they are being sold for a price). "Price management" was not really possible insofar as prices were determined by markets which individual producers could not control, but value-based management was possible.

- Goods could sell below or above their real or socially average value, and that was precisely the critical problem for capitalists, because it affected their gross income and profit margins. The Marxian product-values might be of no interest whatever to capitalists, but the prevailing cost structures and price-levels in their markets certainly are. The wealth of capitalist society might present itself as "a mass of commodities" (as Marx himself put it), but before and after the commodities were sold, they existed outside the market as use values. At that point, they had only a value and a use-value, but not an actual market price (though obviously one could estimate an hypothetical selling price - see also real prices and ideal prices).
- Thus, at the point of production, the "factors of production" themselves had no actual market price either, only a value, because they were being used to create new products, rather than being offered for sale (indeed, what a particular business enterprise was currently "worth" in total, as a going concern, might be very difficult to say; it would depend on how much profit income it was expected to yield in the future compared to the capital assets invested in it, but even if a total price could be estimated, its individual assets might change in value continuously).
- A quantity of value was produced by enterprises, but how much of that value would actually be realised by an enterprise as income from sales, or how gross revenues would be distributed among producers, could not be established with certainty in advance. Yet, the value of the total masses of output-values actually produced by all enterprises affected the market prices that could be obtained by each in distribution; it affected how the market would reward each of the producers, and there was a real, systematic relationship between total value produced and total sales revenue (even although these might not be equal).
- More importantly, producers were constantly adjusting their commercial behaviour to the emerging economic reality (the "state of the market"), as far as they could. And that adjustment followed a specific pattern; Marx argued it created a specific trajectory for capitalist development, guided by the quest for realizing extra surplus value. There is, he argues, a permanent imperative to increase productivity, and producers aim to utilize every possibility for gaining competitive advantage (which includes blocking competition from others in some way).

How could this business reality best be modelled? In contemporary "value-based management" by corporations, we can witness a continual cross-reference between past prices, current prices and future prices occurring, because there is practically no other way to do it for business purposes. In the words of group controller Gerard Ruizendaal of Royal Philips Electronics,

"The main idea is to improve our economic value-added (EVA) every year so our return of capital is more than our cost of capital."

A partner of McKinsey & Company comments:

"The guiding principle of value creation is that companies create value by using capital they raise from investors to generate future cash flows at rates of return exceeding the cost of capital (the rate investors require as payment). The faster companies can increase their revenues and deploy more capital at attractive rates of return, the more value they create. The combination of growth and return on invested capital (ROIC) relative to its cost is what drives value."

In that case, it is impossible for the sum of input values to be exactly equal to the sum of output values. Indeed, that is exactly what, according to Marx, capitalists are in business for: to invest a sum of capital in production in order to get a larger sum of capital out of it. In bourgeois theories, value appears spontaneously out of trading activity in the sphere of circulation. The more the market expands and the more buying and selling there is, the more value there is, on this view. For Marx, it is in reality exactly the other way around: the more value workers create for their company, the faster companies can increase their revenues and deploy more capital at attractive rates of return. Marx regarded the prices of production as the "outward expression" of the results of a valorisation process in production, and in order to be able to talk about price aggregates at all, he thought reference to value relations was completely unavoidable.

Not only was a value-theoretic principle required simply to group prices, relate them and aggregate them (meaning principles of value equivalence, comparable value, value transfer, value conservation, value creation and value used up or destroyed), but most of the stock of labour-products in an economy at any time had no actual price, simply because they weren't being traded. To what extent their value could be realised through exchange in the future could be known definitely only "after the fact", i.e. after they were actually sold and paid for. In the meantime, one could only hypothesize about their price, working from previous data. But in the final analysis, the attribution of value to products implied a social relation, without which value relations could not be understood. A community of independent private producers expressed their co-existence and mutual adjustment through the trading prices of their products; how they were socially related was expressed through the forms of value.

== Evaluation ==
The concept of "average profit" (a general profit rate) suggested that a process of competition and market-balancing had already established a uniform (or ruling average, or normal) profit rate previously; yet, paradoxically, what profit volumes would be (and consequently profit rates) could be established only after sales, by deducting costs from gross revenues. An output was produced before it was definitively valued in markets, yet the quantity of value produced affected the total price for which it was sold, and there was a sort of "working knowledge" of normal returns on capital. This was a dynamic business reality Marx sought to model in a simple way.

=== Lack of a formal proof ===
Marx's critics interpreting his models often argue he keeps assuming what he needs to explain, because rather than really "transforming values into prices" by some quantitative mapping procedure, such that prices are truly deduced from labour-values, he either (1) equates value quantities and price quantities, or else (2) he combines both value quantities and price quantities in one equation. Somewhat confusingly, the cost price refers at one point to the capital advanced (input), and at another point to a component of the value of the new product (output).

Thus, for example, either Marx infers a rate of profit from a given capital composition and a given quantity of surplus-value, or else he assumes a rate of profit in order to find the amount of surplus-value applying to a given quantity of capital invested. That might be fine if the aim is to just investigate what profit an enterprise or sector would receive on average, having produced a certain output value with a certain capital composition. But this manoeuvre of itself cannot contain any formal proof of a necessary quantitative relationship between values and prices, nor a formal proof that capitals of the same size but different compositions (and consequently different expenditures of labour-time) must obtain the same rate of profit. It remains only a theory.

Marx insists both that output prices obtained will necessarily deviate from values produced, but also that the sum of prices would equal to the sum of values in the pure case, yet, critics claim, he fails to show quantitatively how a distribution process could then occur such that price magnitudes map onto value magnitudes, and such that a uniform profit rate returns equal profits to capitals of equal sizes (a mapping relation is used here in the mathematical sense of a bijective morphism, involving one-to-one correspondence between value quantities and price quantities via mathematical equations). In that case, there is again no formal proof of any necessary relationship between values and prices, and Marx's manuscript really seems an endless, pointless theoretical "detour" leading nowhere. In modelling, simple logical paradoxes appear of the type that:

- In a static model, it is impossible to uphold the postulate of a uniform rate of profit and the postulate of the equality of total values and total production prices at the same time;
- To find production-prices, a uniform rate of profit must be assumed, while at the same time to find a uniform rate of profit, production-prices must already be assumed;
- A price level must be assumed, rather than be deduced from labour-values.
- Either total production prices can equate with total labour-values of products (i.e., production prices are proportional to product labour-values), or the sum of profits can be equal to the total surplus value, but these two equations cannot hold at the same time.
- The rate of profit in price terms derived for the "price system" fails to equate with the value rate of profit in the "values system".

The mathematical models that were conceptualized to solve these problems do not produce the desired results, unless more assumptions and concepts are introduced into Marx's examples - raising the question of which assumptions are legitimate to make, and whether they can solve anything without creating further inconsistencies.

All the conceptual and logical issues described in the above become crucial when attempts are made to model value and price aggregates mathematically to study capitalist competition. Different kinds of theoretical assumptions or interpretations will obviously lead to very different results.

=== What is the transformation? ===
In general, many modern Marxists nowadays think that Marx's idea of "transformation" was badly misinterpreted. It does not refer to a "mathematical conversion of a system of values into a system of prices". After all, constantly shifting product-values and product-prices co-exist side by side all the time according to Marx's theory, and operate in tandem. Rather, the transformation means that the direct regulation of the exchange of commodities according to their value is, in a capitalist mode of production, transformed into the regulation of the exchange of commodities by their production prices - reflecting the fact, that the supply of commodities in capitalist society has become conditional on the accumulation of capital, and therefore on profit margins and profit rates, within the framework of market competition. Nevertheless, Marx argues that production prices are still determined by underlying product-values (i.e. the average current labour requirements for their supply). There is no logical proof available for that argument, only an empirical proof, insofar as there is a close correspondence between the magnitudes of producers' product prices and the magnitudes of labour-time required to produce them, across longer intervals of time (see below).

If market trade consisted only of simple exchange (the exchange of things of equal value by the direct producers themselves), then balancing production effort, output and demand would be a fairly simple, straightforward matter. But in reality it is not so straightforward precisely because capitalist market trade is not simple exchange. Production effort, output and demand can be balanced in capitalism, only if sufficient profits are made and the accumulation of capital grows. In reality, products are constantly being sold above or below their value, according to what makes the best possible profit on the turnover, given market fluctuations.

Whatever view one takes on the theoretical issues, no one can evade the (either simultaneous or sequential) reciprocal effects of individual business behaviour and aggregate economic outcomes. Additionally, it must also be recognised that "prices" are not all of one kind; actual market prices realised are not the same as ideal prices of various kinds, which may be extrapolated from real prices.

=== Level of abstraction ===
A more serious criticism of Marx is that the theory of prices of production is still pitched at a far too abstract theoretical level to be able to explain anything like specific real price movements. That is, Marx only illustrated with examples the general results towards which the competitive process would tend to move in capitalism as a social system. He tried to establish what regulates product prices in the "simplest and purest case". He believed that if one could not do that, then one could also not explain all the variations from the pure case. He had not however provided a model for accurately predicting specific price movements. In this regard, it is interesting to study the writings of Michael Porter, in order to see how Marx's original intent relates to modern competitive business practice, and how it might be elaborated on (see further the important studies by Willi Semmler, Christian Bidard, Peter Flaschel, Anwar Shaikh, and Lefteris Tsoulfidis).

Some critics conclude that because Marx fails to "transform" value magnitudes into price magnitudes in a way consistent with formal logic, he has not proved value exists, or that it influences prices; in turn, his theory of labour-exploitation must be false. But the validity of Marx's value theory or his exploitation theory may not depend on the validity of his specific transformation procedures, and Marxian scholars indeed often argue that critics mistake what he intended by them. In particular, since value relations - according to Marx - describe the proportionalities between average quantities of labour-time currently required to produce products, value proportions between products exist quite independently of prices (and irrespective of whether goods are currently priced or not). As the structure of product-values changes across time, the structure of prices is likely to change as well, but product-prices will fluctuate above or below product-values and typically respond to changing value proportions only with a certain time lag.

Essentially, the advantage of distinguishing sharply between values and prices in this context is that it enables us to depict the interaction between shifts in product-values and shifts in product-prices as a dynamic process of real-world business and market behaviour, given the reality of different growth rates of supply and demand, i.e. not a study of the conditions for market balance, but a study of the actual process of market balancing occurring with a specific social framework, through successive adjustments which occur in a specific pattern.

Arguably ideal prices could substitute for values in this analysis, but Marx's argument is that product-values will, ontologically speaking, really exist irrespective of corresponding product-prices, i.e. irrespective of whether product-values are actually being traded, whereas ideal prices do not really exist other than in computations; they are only an hypothetical description. The reason is that product-values refer to empirical quantities of labour-time performed, which are not hypothetical, but an inescapable physical and social reality. This type of analysis paves the way for an important new Marxian criticism of Piero Sraffa's otherwise brilliant critique of capital theory.

In Sraffian theory, the value of a commodity "contains" both the average labour directly involved in making it ("direct labour") and past labour contained in the materials from which it is made ("indirect labour" or "dated labour"). After some pioneering work by various scholars, Luigi Pasinetti provided a methodological foundation for measuring the labour content of commodities, in this sense, which was developed further by Anwar Shaikh et al., Eduardo Ochoa, Ed Chilcote, and Lefteris Tsoulfidis et al.

In Marx's developed theory, however, the value of the commodity represents the average labour currently required to make it, given the current state of the whole production complex - it is the current social valuation (the replacement cost) of that commodity. This is a synchronic valuation, not a diachronic one. This was not so clearly realized during the 20th century, because economists could not grasp how, in the course of Marx's dialectical story, the meaning of the operative concept of value itself could undergo some important changes. Because Marx's developed concept of value differs from the simplified concept of value, economists thought that Marx's theory was formally inconsistent.

=== Empirical evidence ===
Some economists and computer scientists, such as Anwar Shaikh and Paul Cockshott, argue with statistical evidence that even just a "93% accurate Ricardian labour theory of value", is a better empirical predictor of prices than other theories. That is, the only real proofs of Marx theory and its applicability, beyond showing its internal logical consistency, are to be found in the evidence of experience.

Whether more scholars will take up this challenge for research more comprehensively remains to be seen. Mostly, economists have preferred to build abstract mathematical models on the basis of a bunch of assumptions, rather than comprehensively investigate available empirical data for the purpose of creating an empirically based theory about economic life. This contrasts with business managers, who have a strongly empirical theory of how business actually works, based on their daily experience of how things go in business.

It is not difficult to prove a close positive correlation between the value of net output and the labour hours worked to produce it, since the payments which constitute that value, are themselves earnings which are necessarily proportional to time worked and paid for. Even if it is assumed, that gross profits are not proportional to time worked, by some margin, the total labour-cost involved in the total net output is nevertheless typically more than half of the value of the total net output or gross value added (in the US, labour compensation is nowadays around 55% of the value of total net output).

The netted totals in the US National Income and Product Accounts (NIPA's) for 2015 show, that annual labour costs were about $9.7 trillion while the total operating surplus or gross profit (net of depreciation) was about $4.5 trillion. In other words, total US labour earnings are twice the size of total gross profit receipts directly generated by production. Since total wage costs are based on time-wages, it is simple math to understand that any measure of the net value added (gross labour compensation + gross profits) which Marx called the value product must necessarily show a strong positive correlation with the total labour hours worked.

What is statistically much more difficult to prove, is the relationship between prices and values in the actual distribution of net output (a traditional example mentioned, is that while in South Korea workers on average work the most working hours in the world, per capita per year, Korean value-added per capita has been much lower than might be expected; it is not so easy to explain, why this is the case).

A very interesting confirmation of the basic idea that Marx had is provided from a most unexpected source: post-Keynesian economics. After mustering a lot of empirical evidence about pricing practices, the leading heterodox "real-world" economist Frederic Sterling Lee concluded that:

"Mark up, normal cost, and target rate of return pricing procedures are used by pricing administrators to establish prices which will cover costs, hopefully produce a profit, and, most importantly, permit the enterprise to engage in sequential acts of production and transactions."

However, a sharp distinction must be drawn between Marx's own theory and subsequent Marxist or Sraffian theories. As Lee emphasizes, "the typical statement made by Sraffians and Marxists that prices equal their costs of production (which includes a uniform rate of profit) in long-period positions has no conceptual correspondence to the concepts of costs and prices used by business enterprises." Consequently, the Marxist and Sraffian theories are apparently not grounded in the real world of business operations, because Marxists and Sraffians conflate a purely abstract model with empirical reality. Fred Lee admits that the magnitude and the relative stability of the profit mark-up for products in modern capitalism "remains theoretically underexplained in Post Keynesian theory"

=== The total circuit of capital and Shaikh's solution ===
One possible solution to the "transformation problem", largely ignored in the literature, is that Marx tried to sketch a redistribution of value in too simplistic terms, considering the profitability of different production capitals in abstraction from the total circuit of capital.

The problem that Ricardo failed to solve, was one of how capitals of equal sizes could empirically attract very similar profits, despite empirically manifest unequal expenditures of labour-time. But that problem may be solved more credibly, if we properly consider competition in the sphere of capital finance, i.e. the sphere of credit. In this sense, David Harvey for example mentions that "the growing power of the credit system in relation to industry also tends to force an equalization of the rate of profit (the connection between profit of enterprise and the interest rate is now very strong)."

Andrea Salanti stated in 1985 that there is an "urgent need" of "reconsidering the whole methodological foundations of the theory of prices of production". In his major 2016 treatise on the economics of capitalist production, Anwar Shaikh has indeed overhauled the whole theory of prices of production in the light of empirical evidence, arguing that production prices in the classical sense can only be theoretical notions, which strictly speaking do not exist in reality. What does exist in real capitalist competition are a type of regulating prices, the dynamics of which he explicates in detail. Shaikh agrees with Keynes and with businesspeople, that what matters financially in business, is the relationship between the real rate of interest on capital and the real rate of profit on capital (at the micro level of individual firms and at the macro-level of aggregated business results).

According to statistical calculations by Shaikh and Tsoulfidis, the discrepancies between the different empirical measures of product-values, prices of production, regulating prices and market prices which are feasible (using input-output data, labour data, incomes data and capital stock data) turn out to be, on the whole, not very large. This suggests that the enormously long Marxist debate about the relationship between product-values and product-prices was, in a sense, unwarranted; overall, the differences between average product-prices and the underlying product-values are, as far as can be established, just not very great. And if the price/value differences are not very great, then Marx was quite justified in mostly disregarding them in Capital, Volume I and Capital, Volume II. In his 2016 treatise, Anwar Shaikh comments that

"The evidence… makes it clear that differences between various price forms are relatively small so that they wash out at the aggregate levels and aggregate ratios are essentially the same whether we use market prices, prices of production, or integrated labor times (Marx's labor values) - as Sraffa himself says."

Had Marxists been able to measure price-value relationships of products empirically much earlier in the controversy, they might not have given the issue so much weight and importance; but the econometric techniques to do it were perfected only from the 1980s onward. However, the validity of econometric techniques used to measure price-value deviations are still in dispute.

Shaikh largely side-steps a more precise conceptual discussion of the relationship between Marxian "values" and the forms of prices as such, preferring to demonstrate a strong positive correlation between movements in labour requirements and movements in actual price-levels for outputs. His analysis suggests, that the real dynamics of capitalist competition in the sphere of production are indeed remarkably similar to how Smith, Ricardo and then Marx originally described them, although Marx's theory must be elaborated and modified to complete the classical theory, so that it is fully consistent and can properly explain the economic facts.

== See also ==
- Capital controversy
- Cost-of-production theory of value
- Surplus product
- Tendency of the rate of profit to fall
- Valorisation
- Value form

== Some additional references ==
- Christian Bidard and Hans G. Ehrbar, "Relative prices in the classical theory: facts and figures".
- Reiner Franke, "Production Prices and Dynamical Processes of the Gravitation of Market Prices". Peter Lang, 1987.
- Diego Guerrero, "Input-Output And Dynamic Values: A Spanish Perspective"
- Diego Guerrero, "The quantitative determination of abstract labour and values."
- Diego Guerrero, "The labour theory of value and the double transformation problem". Nómadas. Revista Crítica de Cien cias Sociales y Jurídicas. Vol. 16 No. 2, 2007.
- Diego Guerrero, "The dependence of prices on labour-values". Atlantic Review of Economics, Vol. 1, 2011
- S. Hollander, Economics of Karl Marx: Analysis and Application. New York: Cambridge University Press, 2008.
- Ulrich Krause and Christian Bidard, "A monotonicity law for relative prices". Economic Theory, vol. 7, issue 1, 1995, pp. 51–61
- G. Stamatis, On the Quantitative Relation between Labour Values and Production Prices. Panteios University, Athens, 1997.
