= Fred Moseley (economist) =

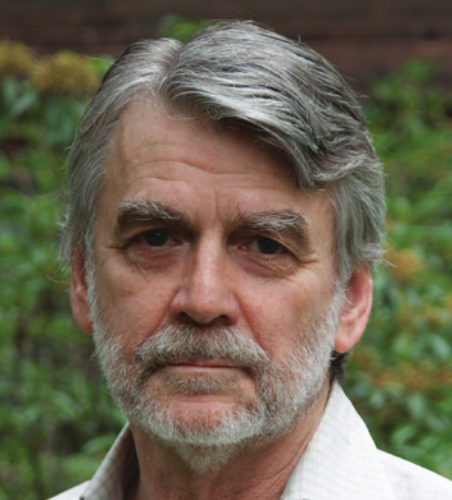
- Born: March 22, 1946 (age 80)

Academic work
- Discipline: History of economic thought, Macroeconomics, comparative economic systems, U.S. economic history, business cycles
- School or tradition: Classical economics, Heterodox economics, Marxian economics
- Institutions: Mount Holyoke College
- Notable ideas: Transformation problem

Fred Baker Moseley (22 March 1946) is an American Marxian economist known for his work in economic theory, especially in the field of political economy from a Marxist perspective.

== Career ==
Moseley graduated and received a B.S. from Stanford University in 1968, and worked for several years at University of Massachusetts Amherst, from which he received his Ph.D. in Economics in 1982. He has been a professor in the Department of Economics at Mount Holyoke College teaching history of economic thought, macroeconomic theory, comparative economic systems, U.S. economic history and business cycles.

Moseley has contributed to the marxian economic theory in the discussion on the labour theory of value, the falling rate of profit, the transformation problem and the critique of capitalism. Moseley argues that Marx understood "value" to be a "macro-monetary" variable (the total amount of labor added in a given year plus the depreciation of fixed capital in that year), which is then concretized at the level of individual prices of production, meaning that "individual values" of commodities do not exist.

== Publications ==
- The Falling Rate of Profit in the Postwar United States Economy (1991)
- Marx’s Logical Method: A Reexamination (1993)
- Heterodox Economic Theories: True or False?(1995)
- New Investigations of Marx’s Method (1997)
- A 'New Solution' for the Transformation Problem: A Sympathetic Critique (1999)
- Marx’s Theory of Money: Modern Appraisals (2004)
- Marx's "Capital" and Hegel's "Logic" (co-edited with Tony Smith, 2014)
- Marx's Economic Manuscript of 1864–1865 (2015)
- Money and Totality: A Macro-monetary Interpretation of Marx's Logic in Capital and the End of the 'transformation Problem' (2015)
- Marx’s Theory of Value in Chapter 1 of Capital: A Critique of Heinrich’s Value-Form Interpretation (2023)
