= Okishio's theorem =

Economic theorem regarding rate of profit

Okishio's theorem is a theorem formulated by Japanese economist Nobuo Okishio. It has had a major impact on debates about Marx's theory of value. Intuitively, it can be understood as saying that if one capitalist raises his profits by introducing a new technique that cuts his costs, the collective or general rate of profit in society goes up for all capitalists. In 1961, Okishio established this theorem under the assumption that the real wage remains constant. Thus, the theorem isolates the effect of pure innovation from any consequent changes in the wage.

For this reason the theorem, first proposed in 1961, excited great interest and controversy because, according to Okishio, it contradicts Marx's law of the tendency of the rate of profit to fall. Marx had claimed that the new general rate of profit, after a new technique has spread throughout the branch where it has been introduced, would be lower than before. In modern words, the capitalists would be caught in a rationality trap or prisoner's dilemma: that which is rational from the point of view of a single capitalist, turns out to be irrational for the system as a whole, for the collective of all capitalists. This result was widely understood, including by Marx himself, as establishing that capitalism contained inherent limits to its own success. Okishio's theorem was therefore received in the West as establishing that Marx's proof of this fundamental result was inconsistent.

More precisely, the theorem says that the general rate of profit in the economy as a whole will be higher if a new technique of production is introduced in which, at the prices prevailing at the time that the change is introduced, the unit cost of output in one industry is less than the pre-change unit cost. The theorem, as Okishio (1961:88) points out, does not apply to non-basic branches of industry.

The proof of the theorem may be most easily understood as an application of the Perron–Frobenius theorem. This latter theorem comes from a branch of linear algebra known as the theory of nonnegative matrices. A good source text for the basic theory is Seneta (1973). The statement of Okishio's theorem, and the controversies surrounding it, may however be understood intuitively without reference to, or in-depth knowledge of, the Perron–Frobenius theorem or the general theory of nonnegative matrices.

== Sraffa model ==
The argument of Nobuo Okishio, a Japanese economist, is based on a Sraffa-model. The economy consists of two departments I and II, where I is the investments goods department (means of production) and II is the consumption goods department, where the consumption goods for workers are produced. The coefficients of production tell how much of the several inputs is necessary to produce one unit of output of a given commodity ("production of commodities by means of commodities"). In the model below two outputs exist $x_1$, the quantity of investment goods, and $x_2$, the quantity of consumption goods.

The coefficients of production are defined as:

- $a_{11}$: quantity of investment goods necessary to produce one unit of investment goods.
- $a_{21}$: quantity of hours of labour necessary to produce one unit of investment goods.
- $a_{12}$: quantity of investment goods necessary to produce one unit of consumption goods.
- $a_{22}$: quantity of hours of labour necessary to produce one unit of consumption goods.

The worker receives a wage at a certain wage rate w (per unit of labour), which is defined by a certain quantity of consumption goods.

Thus:

- $w \cdot a_{21}$: quantity of consumption goods necessary to produce one unit of investment goods.
- $w \cdot a_{22}$: quantity of consumption goods necessary to produce one unit of consumption goods.

This table describes the economy:

	Investment goods used	Consumption goods used	Output
Department I	$a_{11} x_1$	$a_{21} w x_1$	$x_1$
Department II	$a_{12} x_2$	$a_{22} w x_2$	$x_2$

This is equivalent to the following equations:

- $(a_{11} x_1 p_1 + a_{21} w x_1 p_2) (1+r) = x_1 p_1$
- $(a_{12} x_2 p_1 + a_{22} w x_2 p_2) (1+r) = x_2 p_2$
- $p_1$: price of investment good $x_1$
- $p_2$: price of consumption good $x_2$
- $r$: General rate of profit. Due to the tendency, described by Marx, of rates of profits to equalise between branches (here departments) a general rate of profit for the economy as a whole will be created.

In department I expenses for investment goods or for constant capital are:

- $a_{11} x_1 p_1$ and for variable capital:
- $a_{21} w x_1 p_2$.

In Department II expenses for constant capital are:

$$a_{12} x_2p_1$$

and for variable capital:

$$a_{22} w x_2 p_2.$$

(The constant and variable capital of the economy as a whole is a weighted sum of these capitals of the two departments. See below for the relative magnitudes of the two departments which serve as weights for summing up constant and variable capitals.)

Now the following assumptions are made:

- $p_2 = 1$: The consumption good $x_2$ is to be the numéraire, the price of the consumption good $p_2$ is therefore set equal to 1.
- The real wage is assumed to be $w = 2 p_2 = 2.$
- Finally, the system of equations is normalised by setting the outputs $x_1$ and $x_2$ equal to 1, respectively.

Okishio, following some Marxist tradition, assumes a constant real wage rate equal to the value of labour power, that is the wage rate must allow to buy a basket of consumption goods necessary for workers to reproduce their labour power. So, in this example it is assumed that workers get two pieces of consumption goods per hour of labour in order to reproduce their labour power.

A technique of production is defined according to Sraffa by its coefficients of production. For a technique, for example, might be numerically specified by the following coefficients of production:

- $a_{11}=0.8$: quantity of investment goods necessary to produce one unit of investment goods.
- $a_{21}=0.1$: quantity of working hours necessary to produce one unit of investment goods.
- $a_{12}=0.4$: quantity of investment goods necessary to produce one unit of consumption goods.
- $a_{22}=0.1$: quantity of working hours necessary to produce one unit of consumption goods.

From this an equilibrium growth path can be computed. The price for the investment goods is computed as (not shown here): $p_1= 1.78$, and the profit rate is: $r = 0.0961 = 9.61 \%$. The equilibrium system of equations then is:

- $(0.8 \cdot 1 \cdot 1.78 + 0.1 \cdot 2 \cdot 1 \cdot 1) \cdot (1+0.0961) = 1 \cdot 1.78$
- $(0.4 \cdot 1 \cdot 1.78 + 0.1 \cdot 2 \cdot 1 \cdot 1) \cdot (1+0.0961) = 1 \cdot 1$

== Introduction of technical progress ==
A single firm of department I is supposed to use the same technique of production as the department as a whole. So, the technique of production of this firm is described by the following:

$$(a_{11} x_1 p_1 + a_{21} w x_1 p_2) (1+r) = x_1 p_1$$

$$= (0.8 \cdot 1 \cdot 1.78 + 0{,}1 \cdot 2 \cdot 1 \cdot 1) \cdot (1+0.0961) = 1 \cdot 1.78$$

Now this firm introduces technical progress by introducing a technique, in which less working hours are needed to produce one unit of output, the respective production coefficient is reduced, say, by half from $a_{21}=0.1$ to $a_{21}=0.05$. This already increases the technical composition of capital, because to produce one unit of output (investment goods) only half as much of working hours are needed, while as much as before of investment goods are needed. In addition to this, it is assumed that the labour saving technique goes hand in hand with a higher productive consumption of investment goods, so that the respective production coefficient is increased from, say, $a_{11}=0.8$ to $a_{11}=0.85$.

This firm, after having adopted the new technique of production is now described by the following equation, keeping in mind that at first prices and the wage rate remain the same as long as only this one firm has changed its technique of production:

$$= (0.85 \cdot 1 \cdot 1.78 + 0.05 \cdot 2 \cdot 1 \cdot 1) \cdot (1+0.1036) = 1 \cdot 1.78$$

So this firm has increased its rate of profit from $r = 9{,}61 \%$ to $10{,}36 \%$. This accords with Marx's argument that firms introduce new techniques only if this raises the rate of profit.

Marx expected, however, that if the new technique will have spread through the whole branch, that if it has been adopted by the other firms of the branch, the new equilibrium rate of profit not only for the pioneering firm will be again somewhat lower, but for the branch and the economy as a whole. The traditional reasoning is that only "living labour" can produce value, whereas constant capital, the expenses for investment goods, do not create value. The value of constant capital is only transferred to the final products. Because the new technique is labour-saving on the one hand, outlays for investment goods have been increased on the other, the rate of profit must finally be lower.

Let us assume, the new technique spreads through all of department I. Computing the new equilibrium rate of growth and the new price $p_2$ gives under the assumption that a new general rate of profit is established:

- $(0.85 \cdot 1 \cdot 1.77 + 0.05 \cdot 2 \cdot 1 \cdot 1) \cdot (1+0.1030) = 1 \cdot 1.77$
- $(0.4 \cdot 1 \cdot 1.77 + 0.1 \cdot 2 \cdot 1 \cdot 1) \cdot (1+0.1030) = 1 \cdot 1$

If the new technique is generally adopted inside department I, the new equilibrium general rate of profit is somewhat lower than the profit rate, the pioneering firm had at the beginning ($10.36 \%$), but it is still higher than the old prevailing general rate of profit: $10.30 \%$ larger than $9.61 \%$.

== Result ==
Nobuo Okishio proved this generally, which can be interpreted as a refutation of Marx's law of the tendency of the rate of profit to fall. This proof has also been confirmed if the model is extended to include not only circulating capital but also fixed capital. Mechanisation, defined as increased inputs of machinery per unit of output combined with the same or reduced amount of labour-input, necessarily lowers the maximum rate of profit.

== Marxist responses ==
Some Marxists simply dropped the law of the tendency of the rate of profit to fall, claiming that there are enough other reasons to criticise capitalism, that the tendency for crises can be established without the law, so that it is not an essential feature of Marx's economic theory. Others would say that the law helps to explain the recurrent cycle of crises, but cannot be used as a tool to explain the long term developments of the capitalist economy.

Others argued that Marx's law holds if one assumes a constant ‘’wage share’’ instead of a constant real wage ‘’rate’’. Then, the prisoner's dilemma works like this: The first firm to introduce technical progress by increasing its outlay for constant capital achieves an extra profit. But as soon as this new technique has spread through the branch and all firms have increased their outlays for constant capital also, workers adjust wages in proportion to the higher productivity of labour. The outlays for constant capital having increased, wages having been increased now also, this means that for all firms the rate of profit is lower.

However, Marx did not know the law of a constant wage share. Mathematically the rate of profit could always be stabilised by decreasing the wage share. In our example, for instance, the rise of the rate of profit goes hand in hand with a decrease of the wage share from $58.6 \%$ to $41.9 \%$, see computations below. However, a reduction in the wage share is not possible in neoclassical models due to the assumption that wages equal the marginal product of labour.

A third response is to reject the whole framework of the Sraffa-models, especially the comparative static method. Kliman thus argues that the model supposes that input and output prices are the same and that only one technological shift happens, rather than a series of successive innovations. "Even a cursory reading of the law immediately discloses that it refers to the impact of a continuing series of technical changes), and that these technical changes are held to lead to a continuing series of reductions in commodities' prices (given a constant monetary expression of value)", he writes. In a capitalist economy entrepreneurs do not wait until the economy has reached a new equilibrium path but the introduction of new production techniques is an ongoing process. Marx's law could be valid if an ever-larger portion of production is invested per working place instead of in new additional working places. Such an ongoing process cannot be described by the comparative static method of the Sraffa models.

According to Alfred Müller the Okishio theorem could be true, if there was a coordination amongst capitalists for the whole economy, a centrally planned capitalist economy, which is a contradiction in itself. In a capitalist economy, in which means of production are private property, economy-wide planning is not possible. The individual capitalists follow their individual interests and do not cooperate to achieve a general high rate of growth or rate of profit.

== Model in physical terms ==
=== Dual system of equations ===
Up to now it was sufficient to describe only monetary variables. In order to expand the analysis to compute for instance the value of constant capital c, variable capital v and surplus value (or profit) s for the economy as whole or to compute the ratios between these magnitudes like rate of surplus value s/v or value composition of capital, it is necessary to know the relative size of one department with respect to the other. If both departments I (investment goods) and II (consumption goods) are to grow continuously in equilibrium there must be a certain proportion of size between these two departments. This proportion can be found by modelling continuous growth on the physical (or material) level in opposition to the monetary level.

In the equations above a general, for all branches, equal rate of profit was computed given

- certain technical conditions described by input-output coefficients
- a real wage defined by a certain basket of consumption goods to be consumed per hour of labour $x_2$

whereby a price had to be arbitrarily determined as numéraire. In this case the price $p_2$ for the consumption good $x_2$ was set equal to 1 (numéraire) and the price for the investment good $x_1$ was then computed. Thus, in money terms, the conditions for steady growth were established.

=== General equations ===
To establish this steady growth also in terms of the material level, the following must hold:

$$(a_{11} x_1 + K a_{12} x_2) (1+g) = x_1$$
$$(a_{21} w \cdot x_1 + K a_{22} \cdot w x_2) (1+g) = K x_2$$

Thus, an additional magnitude K must be determined, which describes the relative size of the two branches I and II whereby I has a weight of 1 and department II has the weight of K.

If it is assumed that total profits are used for investment in order to produce more in the next period of production on the given technical level, then the rate of profit r is equal to the rate of growth g.

=== Numerical examples ===
In the first numerical example with rate of profit $r = 9.61 \%$ we have:

$$(0.8 \cdot 1 + 0.2808 \cdot 0.4 \cdot 1) \cdot (1+0.0961) = 1$$
$$(0.1 \cdot 2 \cdot 1 + 0.2808 \cdot 0.1 \cdot 2 \cdot 1) \cdot (1+0.0961) = 0.2808 \cdot 1$$

The weight of department II is $K = 0.2808$.

For the second numerical example with rate of profit $r = 10.30 \%$ we get:

$$(0.85 \cdot 1 + 0.14154 \cdot 0.4 \cdot 1) \cdot (1+0.1030) = 1$$
$$(0.1 \cdot 2 \cdot 1 + 0.14154 \cdot 0.05 \cdot 2 \cdot 1) (1+0.1030) = 0.14154 \cdot 1$$

Now, the weight of department II is $K = 0.14154$. The rates of growth g are equal to the rates of profit r, respectively.

For the two numerical examples, respectively, in the first equation on the left hand side is the input of $x_1$ and in the second equation on the left hand side is the amount of input of $x_2$. On the right hand side of the first equations of the two numerical examples, respectively, is the output of one unit of $x_1$ and in the second equation of each example is the output of K units of $x_2$.

The input of $x_1$ multiplied by the price $p_1$ gives the monetary value of constant capital c. Multiplication of input $x_2$ with the set price $p_2 = 1$ gives the monetary value of variable capital v. One unit of output $x_1$ and K units of output $x_2$ multiplied by their prices $p_1$ and $p_2$ respectively gives total sales of the economy c + v + s.

Subtracting from total sales the value of constant capital plus variable capital (c + v) gives profits s.

Now the value composition of capital c/v, the rate of surplus value s/v, and the "wage share" v/(s + v) can be computed.

With the first example the wage share is $58.6 \%$ and with the second example $41.9 \%$. The rates of surplus value are, respectively, 0.706 and 1.389. The value composition of capital c/v is in the first example 6,34 and in the second 12.49. According to the formula

$$\text{Rate of profit }p = {{s \over v} \over {{c \over v} + 1}}$$

for the two numerical examples rates of profit can be computed, giving $9.61 \%$ and $10.30 \%$, respectively. These are the same rates of profit as were computed directly in monetary terms.

=== Comparative static analysis ===
The problem with these examples is that they are based on comparative statics. The comparison is between different economies each on an equilibrium growth path. Models of dis-equilibrium lead to other results. If capitalists raise the technical composition of capital because thereby the rate of profit is raised, this might lead to an ongoing process in which the economy has not enough time to reach a new equilibrium growth path. There is a continuing process of increasing the technical composition of capital to the detriment of job creation resulting at least on the labour market in stagnation. The law of the tendency of the rate of profit to fall nowadays usually is interpreted in terms of disequilibrium analysis, not the least in reaction to the Okishio critique.

== David Laibman and Okishio's theorem ==
Between 1999 and 2004, David Laibman, a Marxist economist, published at least nine pieces dealing with the Temporal single-system interpretation (TSSI) of Marx's value theory. His "The Okishio Theorem and Its Critics" was the first published response to the temporalist critique of Okishio's theorem. The theorem was widely thought to have disproved Karl Marx's law of the tendential fall in the rate of profit, but proponents of the TSSI claim that the Okishio theorem is false and that their work refutes it. Laibman argued that the theorem is true and that TSSI research does not refute it.

In his lead paper in a symposium carried in Research in Political Economy in 1999, Laibman's key argument was that the falling rate of profit exhibited in Kliman (1996) depended crucially on the paper's assumption that there is fixed capital which lasts forever. Laibman claimed that if there is any depreciation or premature scrapping of old, less productive, fixed capital: (1) productivity will increase, which will cause the temporally determined value rate of profit to rise; (2) this value rate of profit will therefore "converge toward" Okishio's material rate of profit; and thus (3) this value rate "is governed by" the material rate of profit.

These and other arguments were answered in Alan Freeman and Andrew Kliman's (2000) lead paper in a second symposium, published the following year in the same journal. In his response, Laibman chose not to defend claims (1) through (3). He instead put forward a "Temporal-Value Profit-Rate Tracking Theorem" that he described as "propos[ing] that [the temporally determined value rate of profit] must eventually follow the trend of [Okishio's material rate of profit]" The "Tracking Theorem" states, in part: "If the material rate [of profit] rises to an asymptote, the value rate either falls to an asymptote, or first falls and then rises to an asymptote permanently below the material rate" Kliman argues that this statement "contradicts claims (1) through (3) as well as Laibman's characterization of the 'Tracking Theorem.' If the physical [i.e. material] rate of profit rises forever, while the value rate of profit falls forever, the value rate is certainly not following the trend of the physical [i.e. material] rate, not even eventually."

In the same paper, Laibman claimed that Okishio's theorem was true, even though the path of the temporally determined value rate of profit can diverge forever from the path of Okishio's material rate of profit. He wrote, "If a viable technical change is made, and the real wage rate is constant, the new MATERIAL rate of profit must be higher than the old one. That is all that Okishio, or Roemer, or Foley, or I, or anyone else has ever claimed!" In other words, proponents of the Okishio theorem have always been talking about how the rate of profit would behave only in the case in which input and output prices happened to be equal. Kliman and Freeman suggested that this statement of Laibman's was simply "an effort to absolve the physicalist tradition of error." Okishio's theorem, they argued, has always been understood as a disproof of Marx's law of the tendential fall in the rate of profit, and Marx's law does not pertain to an imaginary special case in which input and output prices happen for some reason to be equal.

== Quotes ==
- Considered abstractly the rate of profit may remain the same, even though the price of the individual commodity may fall as a result of greater productiveness of labour and a simultaneous increase in the number of this cheaper commodity ... The rate of profit could even rise if a rise in the rate of surplus-value were accompanied by a substantial reduction in the value of the elements of constant, and particularly of fixed, capital. But in reality, as we have seen, the rate of profit will fall in the long run. Karl Marx, Capital III, chapter 13. The last sentence is, however, not from Karl Marx but from Friedrich Engels.
- No capitalist ever voluntarily introduces a new method of production, no matter how much more productive it may be, and how much it may increase the rate of surplus-value, so long as it reduces the rate of profit. Yet every such new method of production cheapens the commodities. Hence, the capitalist sells them originally above their prices of production, or, perhaps, above their value. He pockets the difference between their costs of production and the market-prices of the same commodities produced at higher costs of production. He can do this, because the average labour-time required socially for the production of these latter commodities is higher than the labour-time required for the new methods of production. His method of production stands above the social average. But competition makes it general and subject to the general law. There follows a fall in the rate of profit — perhaps first in this sphere of production, and eventually it achieves a balance with the rest — which is, therefore, wholly independent of the will of the capitalist. Marx, Capital volume III, chapter 15.

== Literature ==
- Foley, D.(1986) Understanding Capital: Marx's Economic Theory. Harvard, US: Harvard University Press. ISBN 0674920880
- Freeman, A. (1996): Price, value and profit – a continuous, general, treatment in: Freeman, A. and Guglielmo Carchedi (eds.) Marx and non-equilibrium economics. Cheltenham, UK and Brookfield, US: Edward Elgar Online
- Okishio, N. (1961) "Technical Change and the Rate of Profit", Kobe University Economic Review, 7, 1961, pp. 85–99.
- Seneta, E. (1973) Non-negative Matrices – An Introduction to Theory and Applications. London: George Allen and Unwin
- Sraffa, P (1960) Production of Commodities by Means of Commodities: Prelude to a critique of economic theory, 1960. Cambridge: CUP.
- Steedman, I. (1977) Marx after Sraffa. London:Verso
