= Temporal single-system interpretation =

Interpretation of Karl Marx's value theory

The temporal single-system interpretation (TSSI) of Karl Marx's value theory emerged in the early 1980s in response to renewed allegations that his theory was "riven with internal inconsistencies" and that it must therefore be rejected or corrected. The inconsistency allegations had been a prominent feature of Marxian economics and the debate surrounding it since at least the 1970s. Andrew Kliman argues that charges of inconsistency serve to legitimate the suppression of Marx's critique of political economy and current-day research based upon it as well as the "correction" of Marx's inconsistencies.

Proponents of the temporal-single system interpretation of Marx's value theory claim that the supposed inconsistencies are actually the result of misinterpretation; they argue that when Marx's theory is understood as "temporal" and "single-system", the internal inconsistencies disappear. In a recent survey of the debate, a proponent of the TSSI concludes that "the proofs of inconsistency are no longer defended; the entire case against Marx has been reduced to the interpretive issue".

Critics of TSSI, including David Laibman (see Criticism section below), argue that Marx intended to present what they characterize as "a structurally consistent" model of value formation in a capitalist economy with competitive profit-rate equalization. They claim that Marx's formulations fail to do this, but also what they characterize as his fundamental insights can be revealed, and extended, by means of models and concepts that emerged after his time. Instead of trying to defend the consistency of Marx's original statements, non-TSSI Marxist theorists pursue what they characterize as ever-more effective versions of what they claim to be the core theory. They also claim that they believe that Marx himself would have done this.

== Scope of TSSI research ==
Among the main issues addressed by the TSSI are Marx's law of the tendency of the rate of profit to fall and the transformation of commodity values into prices of production––the so-called transformation problem––in Das Kapital Volume 3. TSSI authors have also challenged the "Fundamental Marxian theorem", which supposedly showed that Marx's value theory is unnecessary in order to arrive at his conclusion that exploitation of workers is the unique source of profit under capitalism.

Other research informed by the TSSI includes studies of the impact of European economic integration, theoretical and empirical analysis of economic crisis (see Crisis), critiques of the static equilibrium methodology widely employed in economics (mainstream as well as Sraffian and Marxian), and challenges to the statistical claim that industry-level values and prices are strongly correlated. Drawing on their experiences in the controversy over Marx's value theory, some proponents of the TSSI have also been active in the movement for pluralism in economics, and they have critiqued, and argued for the reform of, the interpretive methods employed in Marxian economics.

Proponents of the TSSI include, among others, Guglielmo Carchedi, John Ernst, Alan Freeman, Paolo Giussani, Andrew Kliman, Eduardo Maldonado-Filho, Ted McGlone, Nick Potts and Alejandro Ramos Martinez.

== Significance of temporal and single-system ==
The words "temporal" and "single-system" in the title of the TSSI refer to the two key differences between it and the interpretation of Marx's value theory derived from Ladislaus von Bortkiewicz that at one time dominated academic Marxist economics.

According to the Bortkiewiczian interpretation, prices and values of inputs into the production process are, in Marx's theory, determined simultaneously with the prices and values of the outputs that later emerge from the production process. Thus, inputs' prices (or values) and outputs' prices (or values) are necessarily equal. In contrast, the TSSI is "temporal" or non-simultaneous, holding that prices (and values) of inputs and outputs in Marx's theory need not be (and generally are not) equal.

Second, according to the Bortkiewiczian interpretation of Marx's value theory, values and prices constitute two distinct and independent "systems". With respect to relative magnitudes, prices do not depend on values, and values do not depend on prices. Prices of outputs depend on the prices of the inputs used to produce them, while values of outputs depend on the values of the inputs used to produce them. In contrast, the TSSI is a "single-system" interpretation since it holds that, in Marx's theory, (a) prices of outputs depend in the aggregate on the so-called "value rate of profit" (the ratio of surplus-value to capital invested), while (b) businesses' investments of capital value, and thus the values of the outputs produced, depend partly on the prices of the inputs acquired by means of these investments. Value and price are therefore determined interdependently, though they remain distinct.

== Alleged proofs of Marx's inconsistencies ==
"Okishio's theorem", a result produced by the Japanese Marxian economist Nobuo Okishio in 1961, was widely regarded as having disproved Marx's law of the tendency of the rate of profit to fall, but TSSI authors have claimed that Marx's rate of profit (as they interpret it) can fall in circumstances in which Okishio's theorem says that "the" rate of profit cannot fall. Duncan K. Foley, a prominent critic of the TSSI, stated that

"I understand [Alan] Freeman and [Andrew] Kliman to be arguing that Okishio’s theorem as literally stated is wrong because it is possible for the money and labor rates of profit to fall under the circumstances specified in its hypotheses. I accept their examples as establishing this possibility.”

In 1906-07, Ladislaus von Bortkiewicz claimed to prove that Marx's account of "the transformation of commodity values into prices of production" (i.e., prices that allow businesses to obtain an average rate of return on their capital investments) was internally inconsistent. "Correcting" the inconsistency, Bortkiewicz produced results that seriously call into question Marx's theory that prices and profits are determined, in the aggregate, by the production of value and surplus-value: the "price rate of profit" no longer equals the "value rate of profit", and the sum of prices diverges from the sum of values. Proponents of the TSSI claim to have disproved Bortkiewicz's position, but many Marxist economists do not agree with it.

== Criticism ==
Critics of the TSSI have characterized it as an outdated theory which asserts that "Marx made no errors". For instance, David Laibman charges that its proponents are non-scientific Marxists who

"assert that Marx's formulations, in both the theory of value and the analysis of capitalist accumulation and crisis, are literally and completely correct; that Marx made no errors . . . ."

Roberto Veneziani similarly alleges that the TSSI upholds "the literal truth of all [of] Marx’s propositions".

Proponents of the TSSI contend that these allegations are false:

"We have never said that Marx’s contested insights are necessarily true . . . . We simply say the claims that his value theory is necessarily wrong, because it is logically invalid, are false."

Similarly, Andrew Kliman distinguishes between internal consistency on the one hand, and truth or correctness on the other, at least nine different times. For instance, he writes that the TSSI's ability to eliminate the apparent inconsistencies in Marx's value theory does not imply

"that Marx’s theoretical conclusions are necessarily correct. It does imply, however, that empirical investigation is needed in order to determine whether they are correct or not. There is no justification for disqualifying his theories a priori, on logical grounds."

Within their criticism of the TSSI's handling of the Okishio theorem, Laibman and Foley claimed that material profit rates predict trends within value profit rates. Duncan Foley specifically, claimed that the profit rates do not diverge really “asymptotically”. David Laibman proposed a tracking theorem critique, where the value rate of profit follows the trend set by the material profit rate. What “do not diverge asymptotically” means is that there is a maximum amount by which the two rates will differ. For instance, if rising productivity growth causes the physical rate of profit to rise from 25% to a maximum level of 50%, while causing the value/price rate to fall from 25% to a minimum level of 0%, the two rates have not diverged asymptotically. It is extremely difficult to see how this result (which is, in any case, specific to Foley’s example) can possibly be construed as confirmation of the notion that the physical rate of profit governs the value/price rate, much less as a confirmation of the Okishio theorem. If the physical rate of profit rises forever, while the value rate of profit falls forever, the value rate is certainly not following the trend of the physical rate, not even eventually.

The two critics ultimately rescinded their points:

David Laibman claimed:

“If a viable technical change is made, and the real wage rate is constant, the new MATERIAL rate of profit must be higher than the old one. That is all that Okishio, or Roemer, or Foley, or I, or anyone else has ever claimed!”

Duncan Foley claimed:

“I understand Freeman and Kliman to be arguing that Okishio’s theorem as literally stated is wrong because it is possible for the money and labor rates of profit to fall under the circumstances specified in its hypotheses. I accept their examples as establishing this possibility”

== See also ==
- Critique of political economy
