= Transformation problem =

Pricing problem in Marxism

In 20th-century discussions of Karl Marx's economics, the transformation problem is the problem of finding a general rule by which to transform the "values" of commodities (based on their socially necessary labour content, according to his labour theory of value) into the "competitive prices" of the marketplace. This problem was first introduced by Marxist economist Conrad Schmidt and later dealt with by Marx in chapter 9 of the draft of volume 3 of Capital. The essential difficulty was this: given that Marx derived profit, in the form of surplus value, from direct labour inputs, and that the ratio of direct labour input to capital input varied widely between commodities, how could he reconcile this with a tendency toward an average rate of profit on all capital invested among industries, if such a tendency (as predicted by Marx and Ricardo) exists?

== Marx's theory ==
Marx defines value as the number of hours of labor socially necessary to produce a commodity. This includes two elements: First, it includes the hours that a worker of normal skill and dedication would take to produce a commodity under average conditions and with the usual equipment (Marx terms this "living labor"). Second, it includes the labor embodied in raw materials, tools, and machinery used up or worn away during its production (which Marx terms "dead labor" as it is not done by live beings). In capitalism, workers spend a portion of their working day reproducing the value of their means of subsistence, represented as wages (necessary labor), and a portion of their day producing value above and beyond that, referred to as surplus value, which goes to the capitalist (surplus labor). Marx uses this to establish that the value of a commodity $C$ is composed of the value of the dead labor, or constant capital $c$, and the value of the necessary labor, or variable capital $v$ that was originally paid for prior to the production process, plus the value of the surplus labor, or surplus value $s$ generated by living labor but not paid for by the capitalist ($C = c + v + s$).

According to Marx, the source of capitalist profit is this surplus value created by the surplus labor of the workers, and the rate of profit $r$ can be defined as $r = s / (c + v)$, since in this theory only new, living labor produces value, and only surplus labor is not paid for by the capitalist. When this formula is combined with the assumption that the rate of surplus value ($s/v$) tends to equalize across industries, it should be the case that enterprises with a low organic composition ($c/v$), or a higher proportion of capital spent on living labor, would have a higher rate of profit than enterprises with a high organic composition, or a higher proportion of capital spent on raw materials and means of production. However, in models of classical perfect competition, higher rates of profit are not generally found in enterprises with a low organic composition, and low rates of profit are not generally found in enterprises with a high organic composition. Instead, there is a tendency toward equalization of the rate of profit in industries of different organic compositions. That is, in such models with no barriers to entry, capitalists are free to disinvest or invest in any industry, a tendency exists towards the formation of a general rate of profits, constant across all industries.

Marx outlined the transformation problem as a theoretical solution to this discrepancy. The tendency of the rate of profit toward equalization means that, in this theory, there is no simple translation from value to money—e.g., 1 hour of value equals 20 dollars—that is the same across every sector of the economy. While such a simple translation may hold approximately true in general, Marx postulated that there is an economy-wide, systematic deviation according to the organic compositions of the different industries, such that 1 hour of value equals 20 dollars times T, where T represents a transformation factor that varies according to the organic composition of the industry in consideration.

In this theory, T is approximately 1 in industries where the organic composition is close to average, less than 1 in industries where the organic composition is below average, and greater than 1 in industries where the organic composition is higher than average.

Because Marx was considering only socially necessary labor, this variation among industries has nothing to do with higher-paid, skilled labor versus lower-paid, unskilled labor. This transformation factor varies only with respect to the organic compositions of different industries.

== British classical labor theory of value ==
Marx's value theory was developed from the labor theory of value discussed by Adam Smith and used by many British classical economists. It became central to his economics.

=== Simplest case: labor costs only ===
Consider the simple example used by Adam Smith to introduce the subject. Assume a hunters’ economy with free land, no slavery, and no significant current production of tools, in which beavers $(B)$ and deer $(D)$ are hunted. In the language of modern linear production models, call the unit labour-input requirement for the production of each good $l_i$, where $i$ may be $B$ or $D$ (i.e., $l_B$ is the number of hours of uniform labour normally required to catch a beaver, and $l_D$ a deer; notice that we need to assume labour as uniform in order to be able, later on, to use a uniform wage rate).

In this case, Smith noticed, each hunter will be willing to exchange one deer (which costs him $l_D$hours) for ${l_D \over l_B}$ beavers. The ratio ${l_D \over l_B}$—i.e., the relative quantity of labour embodied in (unit) deer production with respect to beaver production—gives thus the exchange ratio between deer and beavers, the "relative price" of deer in units of beavers. Moreover, since the only costs are here labor costs, this ratio is also the "relative unit cost" of deer for any given competitive uniform wage rate $w$. Hence the relative quantity of labor embodied in deer production coincides with the competitive relative price of deer in units of beavers, which can be written as ${P_D \over P_B}$ (where the $P$ stands for absolute competitive prices in some arbitrary unit of account, and are defined as $P_i = wl_i$).

=== Capital costs ===
Things become more complicated if production uses some scarce capital good as well. Suppose that hunting requires also some arrows $(A)$, with input coefficients equal to $a_i$, meaning that to catch, for instance, one beaver you need to use $a_B$ arrows, besides $l_B$ hours of labour. Now the unit total cost (or absolute competitive price) of beavers and deer becomes

$$P_i = wl_i + k_A a_i , (i = B, D)$$

where $k_A$ denotes the capital cost incurred in using each arrow.

This capital cost is made up of two parts. First, there is the replacement cost of substituting the arrow when it is lost in production. This is $P_A$, or the competitive price of the arrows, multiplied by the proportion $h \le 1$ of arrows lost after each shot. Second, there is the net rental or return required by the arrows' owner (who may or may not be the same person as the hunter using it). This can be expressed as the product $r P_A$, where $r$ is the (uniform) net rate of return of the system.

Summing up, and assuming a uniform replacement rate $h$, the absolute competitive prices of beavers and deer may be written as

$$P_i = wl_i + (h + r) P_A a_i$$

Yet we still have to determine the arrows' competitive price $P_A$. Assuming arrows are produced by labor only, with $l_A$ man-hours per arrow, we have:

$$P_A = wl_A$$

Assuming further, for simplicity, that $h = 1$ (i.e., all arrows are lost after just one shot, so that they are circulating capital), the absolute competitive prices of beavers and deer become:

$$P_i = wl_i + (1 + r) wl_A a_i$$

Here, $l_i$ is the quantity of labor directly embodied in beaver and deer unit production, while $l_A a_i$ is the labor indirectly thus embodied, through previous arrow production. The sum of the two,

$$E_i = l_i + l_A a_i$$,

gives the total quantity of labor embodied.

It is now obvious that the relative competitive price of deer ${P_D \over P_B}$ can no longer be generally expressed as the ratio between total amounts of labour embodied. With $a_i > 0$ the ratio ${E_D \over E_B}$ will correspond to ${P_D \over P_B}$ only in two very special cases: if either $r = 0$; or, if ${l_B \over l_D} = {a_B \over a_D}$. In general the two ratios will not only differ: ${P_D \over P_B}$ may change for any given ${E_D \over E_B}$, if the net rate of return or the wages vary.

As it will now be seen, this general lack of any functional relationship between ${E_D \over E_B}$ and ${P_D \over P_B}$, of which Ricardo had been particularly well aware, is at the heart of Marx's transformation problem. For Marx, r is the quotient of surplus value to the value of capital advanced to non-labor inputs, and is typically positive in a competitive capitalist economy.

== Marx's labour theory of value ==
=== Surplus value and exploitation ===
Marx distinguishes between labour power as the potential to work, and labour, which is its actual use. He describes labour power as a commodity, and like all commodities, Marx assumes that on average it is exchanged at its value. Its value is determined by the value of the quantity of goods required for its reproduction.

Yet there is a difference between the value of labour power and the value produced by that labour power in its use. Unlike other commodities, in its use, labour power produces new value beyond that used up by its use. This difference is called surplus value and is for Marx the source of profit for the capitalists. The appropriation of surplus labor is what Marx denoted the exploitation of labour.

=== Labour as the "value-creating substance" ===
Marx defined the "value" of a commodity as the total amount of socially necessary labour embodied in its production. He developed this special brand of the labour theory of value in the first chapter of volume 1 of Capital'. Due to the influence of Marx's particular definition of value on the transformation problem, he is quoted at length where he argues as follows:

Let us take two commodities, e.g., corn and iron. The proportions in which they are exchangeable, whatever those proportions may be, can always be represented by an equation in which a given quantity of corn is equated to some quantity of iron: e.g., 1 quarter corn = x cwt. iron. What does this equation tell us? It tells us that in two different things—in 1 quarter of corn and x cwt. of iron, there exists in equal quantities something common to both. The two things must therefore be equal to a third, which in itself is neither the one nor the other. Each of them, so far as it is exchange value, must therefore be reducible to this third.

This common 'something' cannot be either a geometrical, a chemical, or any other natural property of commodities. Such properties claim our attention only in so far as they affect the utility of those commodities, make them use values. But the exchange of commodities is evidently an act characterised by a total abstraction from use value.

If then we leave out of consideration the use value of commodities, they have only one common property left, that of being products of labour. […] Along with the useful qualities of the products themselves, we put out of sight both the useful character of the various kinds of labour embodied in them, and the concrete forms of that labour; there is nothing left but what is common to them all; all are reduced to one and the same sort of labour, human labour in the abstract.

A use value, or useful article, therefore, has value only because human labour in the abstract has been embodied or materialised in it. How, then, is the magnitude of this value to be measured? Plainly, by the quantity of the value-creating substance, the labour, contained in the article.

—Karl Marx, Capital, Volume I, Chapter 1

=== Variable and constant capital ===
As labour produces in this sense more than its own value, the direct-labour input is called variable capital and denoted as $v$. The quantity of value that living labour transmits to the deer, in our previous example, varies according to the intensity of the exploitation. In the previous example, $v_i = l_W l_i$.

By contrast, the value of other inputs—in our example, the indirect (or "dead") past labour embodied in the used-up arrows—is transmitted to the product as it stands, without additions. It is hence called constant capital and denoted as c. The value transmitted by the arrow to the deer can never be greater than the value of the arrow itself. In our previous example, $c_i = l_A a_i$.

=== Value formulas ===
The total value of each produced good is the sum of the above three elements: constant capital, variable capital, and surplus value. In our previous example:

$$p_i = c_i + v_i + s_i = l_A a_i + l_W l_i + s_i$$

Where $p_i$ stands for the (unit) Marxian value of beavers and deer.

However, from Marx's definition of value as total labour embodied, it must also be true that:

$$p_i = l_A a_i + l_i = E_i$$

Solving for $s_i$ the above two relationships one has:

$${s_i \over v_i} = {(1- l_W) \over l_W} = \sigma$$

for all $i$.

This necessarily uniform ratio ${s_i \over v_i} = \sigma$ is called by Marx the rate of exploitation, and it allows to re-write Marx's value equations as:

$$p_i = c_i + v_i (1 + \sigma) = l_A a_i + l_W l_i (1 + \sigma)$$

== Classical tableaux ==
Like Ricardo, Marx believed that relative labour values— ${p_D \over p_B}$ in the above example—do not generally correspond to relative competitive prices— ${P_D \over P_B}$ in the same example. However, in volume 3 of Capital he argued that competitive prices are obtained from values through a 'transformation process, whereby capitalists redistribute among themselves the given aggregate surplus value of the system in such a way as to bring about a tendency toward an equal rate of profit, $r$, among sectors of the economy. This happens because of the capitalists' tendency to shift their capital toward sectors where it earns higher returns. As competition becomes fierce in a given sector, the rate of return falls, while the opposite will happen in a sector with a low rate of return. Marx describes this process in detail.

=== Marx's reasoning ===
The following two tables adapt the deer-beaver-arrow example seen above (which, of course, is not found in Marx, and is only a useful simplification) to illustrate Marx's approach. In both cases it is assumed that the total quantities of beavers and deer captured are $Q_B$ and $Q_D$ respectively. It is also supposed that the subsistence real wage is one beaver per unit of labour, so that the amount of labour embodied in it is $l_W = E_B = l_A a_B + l_B < 1$. Table 1 shows how the total amount of surplus value of the system, shown in the last row, is determined.

Table 1—Composition of Marxian values in the deer-beaver-arrow production model
Sector	Total Constant Capital $Q_i c_i$	Total Variable Capital $Q_i v_i$	Total Surplus Value $\sigma Q_i v_i$	Unit Value $c_i + (1 + \sigma) v_i$
Beavers	$Q_B l_A a_B$	$Q_B(l_A a_B + l_B) l_B$	$\sigma Q_B (l_A a_B + l_B) l_B$	$l_A a_B + (1 + \sigma) (l_A a_B + l_B) l_B$
Deer	$Q_D l_A a_D$	$Q_D (l_A a_B + l_B) l_D$	$\sigma Q_D (l_A a_B + l_B) l_D$	$l_A a_D + (1 + \sigma) (l_A a_B + l_B) l_D$
Total			$\sigma (l_A a_B + l_B) (Q_B l_B + Q_D l_D)$

Table 2 illustrates how Marx thought this total would be redistributed between the two industries, as "profit" at a uniform return rate, r, over constant capital. First, the condition that total "profit" must equal total surplus value—in the final row of table 2—is used to determine r. The result is then multiplied by the value of the constant capital of each industry to get its "profit". Finally, each (absolute) competitive price in labour units is obtained, as the sum of constant capital, variable capital, and "profit" per unit of output, in the last column of table 2.

Table 2—Marx's transformation formulas in the deer-beaver-arrow production model
Sector	Total Constant Capital $Q_i c_i$	Total Variable Capital $Q_i v_i$	Redistributed Total Surplus Value $rQ_i c_i$	Resulting Competitive Price $v_i + (1 + r) c_i$
Beavers	$Q_B l_A a_B$	$Q_B (l_A a_B + l_B) l_B$	$rQ_B l_A a_B$	$(l_A a_B + l_B) l_B + (1 + r) l_A a_B$
Deer	$Q_D l_A a_D$	$Q_D (l_A a_B + l_B) l_D$	$rQ_D l_A a_D$	$(l_A a_B + l_B) l_D + (1 + r) l_A a_D$
Total			$r l_A(Q_B a_B + Q_D a_D) = \sigma (l_A a_B + l_B) (Q_B l_B + Q_D l_D)$

Tables 1 and 2 parallel the tables in which Marx elaborated his numerical example.

=== Marx's supposed error and its correction ===
Later scholars argued that Marx's formulas for competitive prices were mistaken.

First, competitive equilibrium requires a uniform rate of return over constant capital valued at its price, not its Marxian value, contrary to what is done in table 2 above. Second, competitive prices result from the sum of costs valued at the prices of things, not as amounts of embodied labour. Thus, both Marx's calculation of $r$ and the sums of his price formulas do not add up in all the normal cases, where, as in the above example, relative competitive prices differ from relative Marxian values. Marx noted this but thought that it was not significant, stating in chapter 9 of volume 3 of Capital that "Our present analysis does not necessitate a closer examination of this point."

The simultaneous linear equations method of computing competitive (relative) prices in an equilibrium economy is today very well known. In the greatly simplified model of tables 1 and 2, where the wage rate is assumed as given and equal to the price of beavers, the most convenient way is to express such prices is in units of beavers, which means normalising $w = P_B = 1$. This yields the (relative) price of arrows as

$P_A = l_A$ beavers.

Substituting this into the relative-price condition for beavers,

$$1 = l_B + (1 + r) l_A a_B$$,

gives the solution for the rate of return as

$$r = {(1 - l_B) \over (l_A a_B)} - 1$$

Finally, the price condition for deer can hence be written as

$$P_D = l_D + (1 + r) l_A a_D = l_D + {a_D (1 - l_B) \over a_B}$$.

This latter result, which gives the correct competitive price of deer in units of beavers for the simple model used here, is generally inconsistent with Marx's price formulae of table 2.

Ernest Mandel, defending Marx, explains this discrepancy in term of the time frame of production rather than as a logical error; i.e., in this simplified model, capital goods are purchased at a labour value price, but final products are sold under prices that reflect redistributed surplus value.

== After Marx ==
=== Engels ===
Friedrich Engels, the editor of volume 3 of Capital, hinted since 1894 at an alternative way to look at the matter. His view was that the pure Marxian "law of value" of volume 1 and the "transformed" prices of volume 3 applied to different periods of economic history. In particular, the "law of value" would have prevailed in pre-capitalist exchange economies, from Babylon to the 15th century, while the "transformed" prices would have materialized under capitalism: see Engels's quotation by Morishima and Catephores (1975), p. 310.

Engels's reasoning was later taken up by Meek (1956) and Nell (1973). These authors argued that, whatever one might say of his interpretation of capitalism, Marx's "value" theory retains its usefulness as a tool to interpret pre-capitalist societies, because, they maintained, in pre-capitalist exchange economies there were no "prices of production" with a uniform rate of return (or "profit") on capital. It hence follows that Marx's transformation must have had a historical dimension, given by the actual transition to capitalist production (and no more Marxian "values") at the beginning of the modern era. In this case, this true "historical transformation" could and should take the place of the mathematical transformation postulated by Marx in chapter 9 of volume 3.

=== Other Marxist views ===
There are several schools of thought among those who see themselves as upholding or furthering Marx on the question of transformation from values to prices, or modifying his theory in ways to make it more consistent.

According to the temporal single-system interpretation of Capital advanced by Alan Freeman, Andrew Kliman, and others, Marx's writings on the subject are most robustly interpreted in such a way as to remove any supposed inconsistencies. Modern traditional Marxists argue that not only does the labour theory of value hold up today, but also that Marx's understanding of the transformation problem was in the main correct. Andrew Kliman claimed using the TSSI framework: "Simple reproduction and uniform profitability do require that supplies equal demands, but they can be equal even if the input and output prices of Period 1 are unequal. Since the outputs of one period are the inputs of the next, what is needed in order for supplies to equal demands is that the output prices of Period 1 equal the input prices of Period 2. But they are always equal; the end of one period is the start of the next, so the output prices of one period necessarily equal the input prices of the next period. Once this is recognized, Bortkiewicz’s proofs immediately fail, as was first demonstrated in Kliman and McGIone (1988)".

In the probabilistic interpretation of Marx advanced by Emmanuel Farjoun and Moshe Machover in Laws of Chaos (see references), they "dissolve" the transformation problem by reconceptualising the relevant quantities as random variables. In particular, they consider profit rates to reach an equilibrium distribution. A heuristic analogy with the statistical mechanics of an ideal gas leads them to the hypothesis that this equilibrium distribution should be a gamma distribution.

Finally, there are Marxist scholars (e.g., Anwar Shaikh, Makoto Itoh, Gerard Dumenil and Dominique Levy, and Duncan Foley) who hold that there exists no incontestable logical procedure by which to derive price magnitudes from value magnitudes, but still think that it has no lethal consequences on his system as a whole. In a few very special cases, Marx's idea of labour as the "substance" of (exchangeable) value would not be openly at odds with the facts of market competitive equilibrium. These authors have argued that such cases—though not generally observed—throw light on the "hidden" or "pure" nature of capitalist society. Thus Marx's related notions of surplus value and unpaid labour can still be treated as basically true, although they hold that the practical details of their workings are more complicated than Marx thought.

== Critics of the theory ==
=== Marxian and Sraffian critiques ===
Some mathematical economists assert that a set of functions in which Marx's equalities hold does not generally exist at the individual enterprise or aggregate level, so that chapter 9's transformation problem has no general solution, outside two very special cases. This was first pointed out by, among others, Bortkiewicz (1906). In the second half of the 20th century, Leontief’s and Sraffa’s work on linear production models provided a framework within which to argue this result in a general way.

Although he never actually mentioned the transformation problem, Sraffa’s (1960) chapter 6 on the "reduction" of prices to "dated" amounts of current and past embodied labour gave implicitly the first general proof, showing that the competitive price $P_i$ of the $i^{th}$ produced good can be expressed as

$$P_i = \sum_{n=0}^\infty l_{in} w {(1+r)^n}$$,

where $n$ is the time lag, $l_{in}$ is the lagged-labour input coefficient, $w$ is the wage, and $r$ is the "profit" (or net return) rate. Since total embodied labour is defined as

$$E_i = \sum_{n=0}^\infty l_{in}$$,

it follows from Sraffa’s result that there is generally no function from $E_i$ to $P_i$, as was made explicit and elaborated upon by later writers, notably Ian Steedman in Marx after Sraffa.

A standard reference, with an extensive survey of the entire literature prior to 1971 and a comprehensive bibliography, is Samuelson's (1971) "Understanding the Marxian Notion of Exploitation: A Summary of the So-Called Transformation Problem Between Marxian Values and Competitive Prices" Journal of Economic Literature 9 2 399–431.

Proponents of the temporal single system interpretation such as Moseley (1999), who argue that the determination of prices by simultaneous linear equations (which assumes that prices are the same at the start and end of the production period) is logically inconsistent with the determination of value by labour time, reject the principles of the mathematical proof that Marx's transformation problem has no general solution. Other Marxian economists accept the proof, but reject its relevance for some key elements of Marxian political economy. Still others reject Marxian economics outright, and emphasise the politics of the assumed relations of production instead.

=== Non-Marxian critiques ===
Mainstream scholars such as Paul Samuelson question the assumption that the basic nature of capitalist production and distribution can be gleaned from unrealistic special cases. For example, in special cases where it applies, Marx's reasoning can be turned upside down through an inverse transformation process; Samuelson argues that Marx's inference that

Profit is therefore the [bourgeois] disguise of surplus value which must be removed before the real nature of surplus value can be discovered. (Capital, volume 3, chapter 2)

could with equal cogency be "transformed" into:

Surplus value is therefore the [Marxist] disguise of profit which must be removed before the real nature of profit can be discovered.

Samuelson not only dismissed the labour theory of value because of the transformation problem, but provided himself, in cooperation with economists like Carl Christian von Weizsäcker, solutions. Von Weizsäcker (1962), along with Samuelson (1971), analysed the problem under the assumption that the economy grows at a constant rate following the Golden Rule of Accumulation. Weizsäcker concludes:

The price of the commodity today is equal to the sum of the 'present' values of the different labour inputs.

During the 19th century, Austrian economist Eugen von Böhm-Bawerk criticized Marx's solution as being inconsistent. While in the first chapter of the Volume I of Capital Karl Marx explained that the value of any commodity was generally reflected by the quantity of labor required, inequality being only a temporary exception, this therefore means that the exchange value generated is completely independent of the ratio between worker and capital of a company. Karl Marx, however, explains in Volume III of Capital that after production capital will move into industries having made the highest rates of profit causing a tendency for the rate of profit to equalize between sectors of production, thus labor values and prices of production will not be equal in practice - which Bohm-Bawerk essentially ignores. Böhm-Bawerk's position rests on the contradiction formulated with the relation between the value and the price of the good in the first volume, arguing that in the abstraction of labor value from exchange value to price of production, the central argument behind the existence and unethical nature of surplus labor value falls apart, as adding up values in the aggregate ultimately ends up rendering the initial justification void.

== See also ==
- Capital accumulation
- Critique of political economy
- Law of value
- Prices of production
- Return of capital
