= Andrew Kliman =

American economist (born 1955)

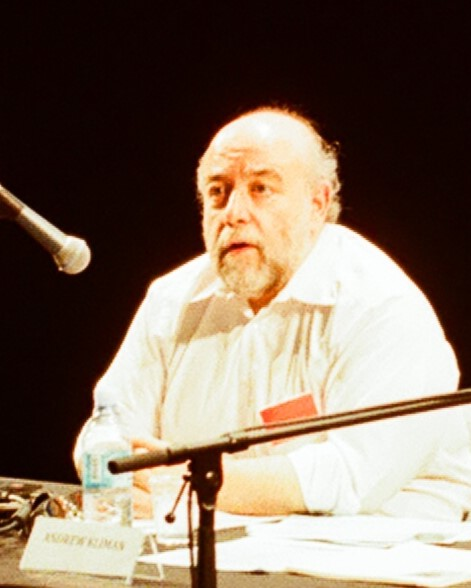
- Born: 1955 (age 70–71)

Academic background
- Education: University of Utah
- Thesis: Rising Joblessness Among Black Male Youth, 1950-1980: A Regional Analysis (1988)
- Influences: Karl Marx, G.W.F. Hegel, Raya Dunayevskaya

Academic work
- Discipline: Economist
- School or tradition: Marxism
- Institutions: Pace University
- Notable ideas: Temporal Single System Interpretation

Andrew Kliman (born 1955) is an American economist and professor of Economics. He is the author of several publications on Marxian economics. His book Reclaiming Marx's "Capital" defends the Temporal Single System Interpretation of Karl Marx's value theory against claims of inconsistency from neoclassical, neo-Ricardian, and other economists.

== Education ==
Kliman holds a BA cum laude (1978) from the University of Maryland and a PhD (1988) in Economics from the University of Utah.

== Reclaiming Marx's Capital ==
Writing in History of Political Economy, professor Bill Lucarelli has argued that "Reclaiming Marx’s “Capital” stands like a beacon in recent academic controversies over Marx’s theory of value. ... Essentially, the aim of this book is not so much about vindicating and canonizing St. Marx, but rather to debunk the myth of internal inconsistency. In so doing, Professor Kliman succeeds quite admirably. ... It is ... an indictment of the academic profession that the TSSI approach has been neglected for more than a quarter of a century. The specter of Sraffa, it appears, still haunts the ivory towers of academia."

Writing in Nova Economia, professor Eduardo Maldonado Filho writes, "The structure of the book, and the manner and accuracy with which the controversial arguments have been presented by the author, allow the interested reader, even one not versed in Marxist economics or mathematics, to understand the issues in the controversy and, not less important, to form his/her own opinion about the topics that have been debated. ... [T]he effort of reading will ... lead to effective comprehension of why Marx’s critics are wrong in their allegations. In my opinion, Kliman’s book constitutes the most important contribution to political economy of the last three decades and, as such, it is highly recommended for all those interested in Marx’s work."

Writing in Review of Radical Political Economics, professor Ajit Sinha argued for the existence of a "major weakness of this book: a lack of rigor in reasoning". His published response was criticized heavily for academic dishonesty and deliberately misrepresenting Kliman's arguments.

== Marxian school of economics ==
Kliman has recently discussed what he calls the "disintegration of the Marxian school" of economics. In this paper, he also proposes measures to halt and reverse this process, namely (1) "the field needs to greatly reduce its dependence on the resources of academia. Intellectual autonomous zones need to be created"; (2) "cooperative behavior and attitudes, not uncooperative ones, need to be fostered and rewarded"; (3) "efforts to solve theoretical problems, not efforts to create and perpetuate them, should be fostered and rewarded"; (4) "run-of-the-mill anomalies such as the 'transformation problem' should not be allowed to become sources of internal crisis"; and (5) "people outside the field need to appreciate how profoundly the myth of Marx’s internal inconsistencies has damaged it. [...] since a false charge of inconsistency issued knowingly is the moral equivalent of defamation, it would not be unreasonable for the public to ask those who have perpetuated the myth of inconsistency to make restitution."

== Selected works ==
- Reclaiming Marx's "Capital": A Refutation of the Myth of Inconsistency, Lexington Books, December 2006, ISBN 978-0739118511
- The Failure of Capitalist Production: Underlying Causes of the Great Recession, Pluto Press, November 2011, ISBN 978-0745332390

== See also ==
- Critique of political economy
