= Soltis =

Soltis is an Americanized spelling of Slavic surnames such as Polish Sołtys or Czech and Slovak Šoltys. Notable people with the surname include:

- Andrew Soltis (born 1947), American chess Grandmaster
- Bob Soltis (1936–2009), American football player
- Douglas E. Soltis (born 1953), American botanist
- Frank Soltis (born 1940), American computer scientist
- Pamela S. Soltis (born 1957), American botanist
- Kristen Soltis Anderson (born 1984), American political writer and television personality

== See also ==
- Anton Šoltis (born 1976), Slovak association football player and manager
- Solti (surname)
- Soltys (disambiguation)
