= Solti (surname) =

Solti is a Hungarian surname. Notable people with the surname include:

- Attila Solti (born 1966), Hungarian-Guatemalan sport shooter
- Georg Solti (1912–1997), Hungarian-British conductor
- József Solti (1911–1982), Hungarian footballer
- Krisztina Solti (born 1968), Hungarian high jumper
- Valerie Solti (1937–2021), known professionally by her birth name Pitts, British television presenter, widow of Sir Georg Solti

== See also ==
- 6974 Solti, asteroid
- Ingar Solty (born 1979), German political writer and journalist
- Soltis
- Soltys (disambiguation)
