= Paul Mattick =

German-American Marxist theorist (1904–1981)

- Mattick in 1973
- Born: March 13, 1904; Stolp, Pomerania, Kingdom of Prussia, German Empire
- Died: February 7, 1981 (aged 76); Cambridge, Massachusetts, U.S.
- Occupations: Council communist theoretician and social revolutionary, toolmaker
- Years active: 1918–1980
- Known for: Left communist anti-Bolshevism, developing Karl Marx's and Henryk Grossman's theory of capitalism for contemporary economics, contributions to crisis theory
- Partner(s): Frieda Mattick; Ilse Hamm Mattick
- Children: Paul Mattick Jr.

Paul Mattick (German: [ˈmatɪk]; March 13, 1904 – February 7, 1981) was a German-American Marxist political writer, activist, and theorist, associated with the council communist movement. Throughout his life, Mattick was critical of capitalism, Bolshevism, and Keynesian economics. His work focused on the critique of political economy, crisis theory, and the self-emancipation of the working class.

Born in Pomerania, Mattick became politically active during the German Revolution of 1918–1919 as an apprentice at Siemens. He joined the Spartacus League and later the Communist Workers' Party of Germany (KAPD), participating in radical actions during the turbulent Weimar Republic. Emigrating to the United States in 1926, he settled in Chicago and became involved with the Industrial Workers of the World (IWW) and later the unemployed movements during the Great Depression.

During the 1930s, Mattick was a key figure in the American council communist milieu, editing journals such as International Council Correspondence. He corresponded extensively with European council communists like Karl Korsch and Anton Pannekoek, and was influenced by Henryk Grossman's theories of capitalist breakdown. After a period of relative isolation following World War II, his work, particularly Marx and Keynes: The Limits of the Mixed Economy (1969), gained renewed attention with the rise of the New Left in the 1960s and 1970s, especially in Europe.

Mattick remained a prolific writer, analyzing contemporary capitalism, state intervention, and the failures of both traditional social democracy and Leninist vanguardism. He advocated for a classless society based on workers' councils and direct democratic control over production and distribution.

== Early life and political awakening in Germany ==
=== Childhood and World War I ===
Paul Mattick was born on March 13, 1904, in Pomerania, then part of the German Empire, and spent his early childhood in Berlin. His family was part of the urban migration of the early 1900s; his father, originally a farmhand, became an unskilled laborer at the Siemens manufacturing complex in Berlin, while his mother worked as a maid and laundress. The family, which included Paul and four sisters, lived in poverty in a single room in the Charlottenburg district. Despite their limited literacy, Mattick's parents emphasized education. His father, initially a stone-hauler, became a teamster at Siemens and joined a socialist union, often engaging in political discussions with younger workmates. The family read socialist newspapers like Vorwärts and the Sunday supplement Neue Welt. At age nine, Mattick was encouraged by his father to join the Social Democratic youth group, which was known for its anti-war and anti-militarist stance.

The outbreak of World War I in 1914 dramatically altered Mattick's life. His father was drafted and sent to Belgium, and his mother increased her outside employment. School conditions deteriorated due to budget cuts, and Mattick described many instructors, some disabled military officers, as sadistic. This led to his deliberate academic failure to avoid a particularly notorious teacher and a general aversion to formal schooling. Widespread food shortages and rationing led Mattick and his friends to steal food and coal. He contracted tuberculosis during this period, a health issue that would persist into adulthood.

=== German Revolution and radicalization ===
Mattick's mother became his initial conduit to political activity. In May 1916, at age twelve, he followed her to an anti-war strike and demonstration where looting occurred. He witnessed a woman use her hatpin against a mounted police officer's horse, leading to the officer being unseated and trampled—an event he later saw as his first encounter with direct revolutionary action. His father, upon returning from active duty in 1916, aligned with the anti-war movement and the Spartacus League.

In March 1918, at age fourteen, Mattick began an apprenticeship as a tool-and-die maker at Siemens, where his father worked. While he found the shop floor experience harsh and abusive, similar to his schooling, he valued the classroom instruction in subjects like stenography, drafting, and mathematics, which trained him for skilled decision-making.

During the German Revolution of 1918, which began with the Kiel mutiny in November, Siemens closed for several days. Mattick roamed Berlin, witnessing the revolutionary fervor. He was elected as an apprentice representative to the factory council formed at Siemens but was disappointed by its lack of radicalism and the persistence of hierarchical attitudes. He became active in the Freie Sozialistische Jugend (FSJ; Free Socialist Youth), which served as a meeting point for radical youth regardless of their parents' specific left-wing affiliations. The FSJ in Charlottenburg, where Mattick was active, had about 200 members.

The German Communist Party (KPD) formed in late 1918, drawing from groups including the Spartacists. Mattick aligned with its more radical, anti-parliamentary, and anti-union wing. The KPD had close ties with syndicalists, particularly the Freie Arbeiter-Union Deutschlands (FAUD; Free Workers' Union of Germany). During the Spartacist uprising in January 1919, Mattick caught a glimpse of Karl Liebknecht. The uprising was suppressed by the Freikorps, and Rosa Luxemburg and Liebknecht were murdered. This period of "revolution in retreat" was depressing for the left. Mattick's FSJ group began publishing its own paper, Junge Garde (Young Guards), for which he wrote and distributed articles.

=== KAPD and early activism ===
The Kapp Putsch in March 1920, a right-wing military coup attempt, was met by a massive general strike. Mattick participated in demonstrations in Charlottenburg. After attempting to retrieve weapons from a complex occupied by putschists, he was arrested and severely beaten by police officers with sword belts, losing consciousness. His sixteenth birthday coincided with the coup's collapse. In the aftermath, the Social Democratic government used putschist-sympathizing troops to suppress radical leftists.

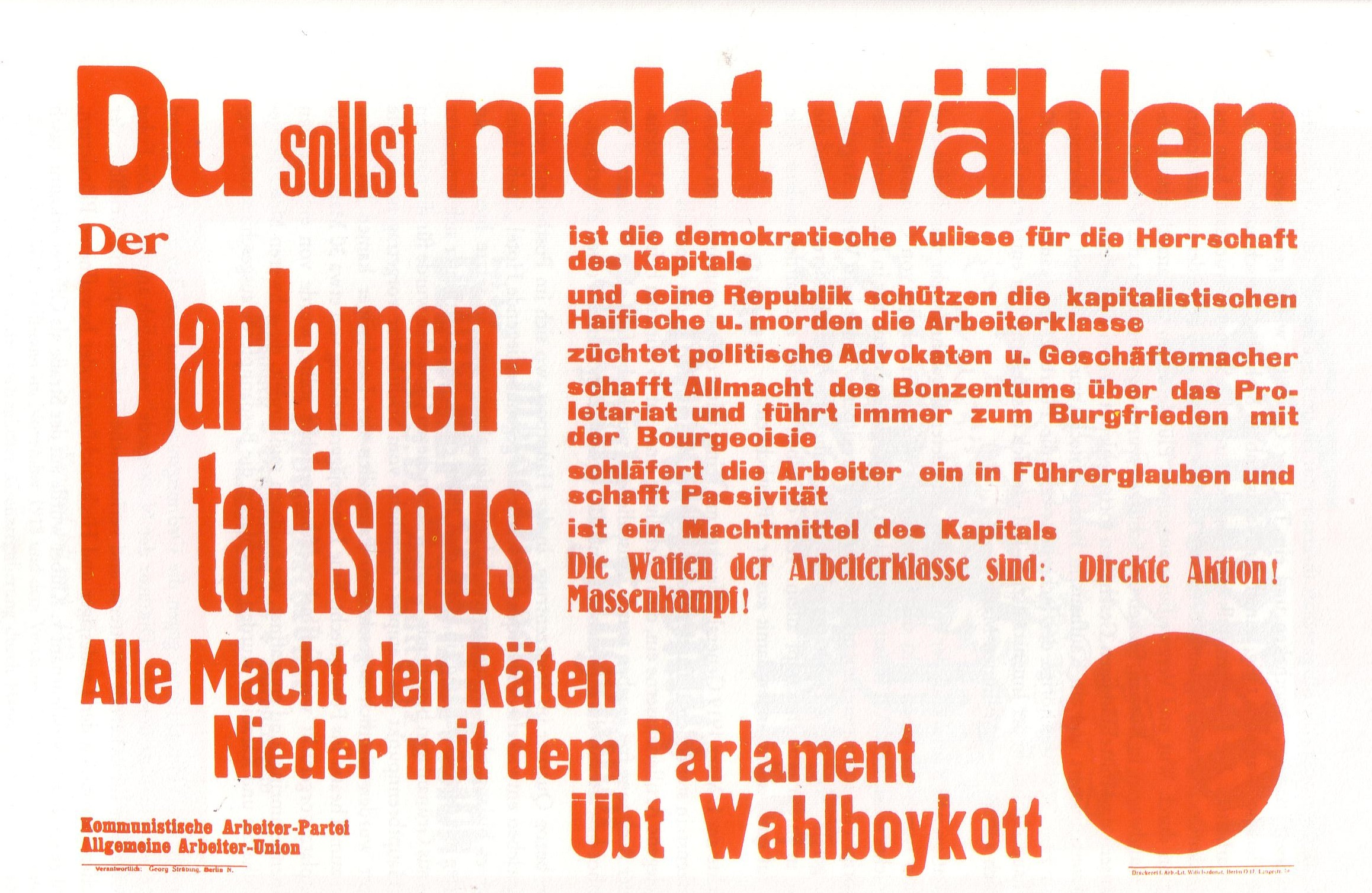
Anti-election poster of the Communist Workers' Party of Germany (KAPD), 1920

Following the Ruhr uprising, Mattick became a founding member of the Communist Workers' Party of Germany (KAPD) in April 1920. The KAPD, which initially had around 38,000 members nationwide (7,500 in Berlin), viewed itself as a temporary organization until the working class could seize power through workers' councils. Mattick's youth group joined the KAPD en masse. He contributed to its Charlottenburg paper, Rote Jugend (Red Youth), and participated in expropriations to fund the movement, including stealing metals from Siemens and attempting robberies. These "class-conscious crimes" were guided by a politicized ethic regarding targets and the use of proceeds.

During the March Action of 1921, a series of KPD and KAPD-initiated strikes and uprisings, Mattick's youth group agitated among the unemployed in Berlin. Mattick participated in an attempt to instigate a walk-out at the large Borsig factory complex, but it was unsuccessful. Prior to these events, he had been arrested for theft of workplace materials from Siemens; following a lengthy legal process and the intervention of his Siemens instructors, he was dismissed from his apprenticeship and received a jail sentence, though it appears he avoided serving significant time.

== Interwar activism and emigration ==
=== Germany in the early 1920s ===
After leaving Siemens, Mattick's employment became sporadic. He traveled to Hanover and Bremen, a center of radical activity, working briefly as an electrician before returning to Berlin. He found a clerical job with a sugar industry trade association, where he engaged in petty theft of mail and eventually sold the association's entire archive to a paper-recycling dealer, using the proceeds for his youth group. He also hawked newspapers to earn money for meals.

A relationship with Selma Babad, a multilingual typist eight years his senior, began during this period. Babad assisted Mattick with forging documents for employment, as he lacked complete apprenticeship papers. Their correspondence covered a wide range of political and literary topics. Babad, more moderate politically, encouraged Mattick to pursue regular employment and further professional training. The relationship eventually ended, with Babad criticizing Mattick's recklessness and perceived immaturity.

The radical left in Germany was in decline, with the KAPD shrinking significantly by 1922 due to internal splits and dwindling support. One major schism involved the relationship with the Russian Bolsheviks; another concerned the structure of the movement, with some advocating for a "unity organization" (Allgemeine Arbeiter Union-Einheitsorganisation, AAUE) that would merge political and workplace (Allgemeine Arbeiter Union Deutschlands, AAUD) functions. Despite these issues, the combined KAPD-AAUD-AAUE still had around 50,000 adherents in mid-1922. Mattick worked briefly at Deutz Engines in Cologne, a physically demanding job in locomotive production. He helped instigate a strike there, leading to his arrest warrant for destruction of property, though charges were later dropped. He also participated in an AAUD strike at the Hoechst chemical complex in Leverkusen, which involved a two-week factory occupation.

During these years, Mattick developed important friendships. Reinhold Klingenberg, whose family home in Berlin provided a sanctuary and exposure to art and literature, shared a similar radical political trajectory. Karl Gonschoreck, a fellow working-class writer and expropriator, encouraged Mattick's literary efforts and published in the same KAPD and AAUD papers, such as Kommunistische Arbeiter Zeitung (KAZ) and Kampfruf. Between 1924 and 1926, Mattick published around twenty pieces, including vignettes, political commentary, and book reviews. He also had contact with the Cologne Progressives, a group of radical artists including Franz Seiwert, through his acquaintance Paul Kühne.

In Cologne, Mattick met Frieda Olle (née Schnorrenberg, formerly Rheiner), the widow of the expressionist poet Walter Rheiner. Seven years his senior, charismatic, and involved in Cologne's radical art and publishing scene, Frieda had two young children, Renee and Hans. After Walter Rheiner's death by drug overdose in June 1925, Frieda faced pressure from welfare authorities due to her cohabitation with Mattick and her reliance on public support. To prevent her children from being placed in foster care, Paul and Frieda married four months after Rheiner's death.

=== Emigration to the United States ===
Chronic unemployment and the declining radical movement in Germany led the Matticks to consider emigration. Distant relatives in Benton Harbor, Michigan, provided affidavits for the voyage. Mattick secured funding for his passage from the city of Cologne, arguing it was cheaper than long-term unemployment support. He sailed in March 1926, just before his twenty-second birthday, listed as a "library clerk" on the ship's manifest. The twelve-day voyage in third class was an unpleasant experience, culminating in a day-long processing at Ellis Island, which Mattick found immense, impersonal, and bureaucratic.

Mattick found factory work in Benton Harbor arranged by his relatives, who had hoped he would marry one of their daughters. When they learned he was already married, relations cooled, and Frieda and the children were isolated upon their arrival five months later. The family struggled with debt, and life in the small town was a sharp contrast to their cosmopolitan experiences in Germany. A miscarriage added to Frieda's distress. In spring 1927, Mattick learned of his father's death in Berlin from suspected lead poisoning. His mother, then forty-eight, returned to work as a laundress.

Despite the difficulties, Mattick resumed writing in German, contributing cultural criticism and fictionalized accounts of American working-class life to the German radical press, particularly KAZ and Kampfruf. He analyzed working-class obsessions with sports and stock markets, the pervasiveness of religion, and the influence of advertising.

=== Great Depression and Chicago ===
In September 1928, Mattick moved to Chicago and began working as a mechanic at Western Electric's Hawthorne Works, a massive telecommunications equipment plant. Employment there peaked at 43,000 during the speculative surge before the Great Depression. The company offered extensive corporate welfare programs, though Mattick was subject to fines for lateness due to his preoccupation with reading and writing.

In Chicago, Mattick connected with the Industrial Workers of the World (IWW), distributing KAZ and Kampfruf at German-speaking events. He initiated discussions about amalgamating the IWW with German council communist groups (KAPD/AAUD), leading to extensive correspondence and translation projects. Key differences emerged regarding political affiliations and organizational forms; the IWW insisted that the AAUD reconstitute itself as IWW chapters, which German colleagues saw as a "Bolshevisation" reminiscent of earlier Comintern dictates. Mattick's article "On International Affiliations" (1930), his first in English, appeared in several IWW papers and AAUD publications, sparking wide debate. Ultimately, the amalgamation efforts failed, and Mattick drifted from the IWW.

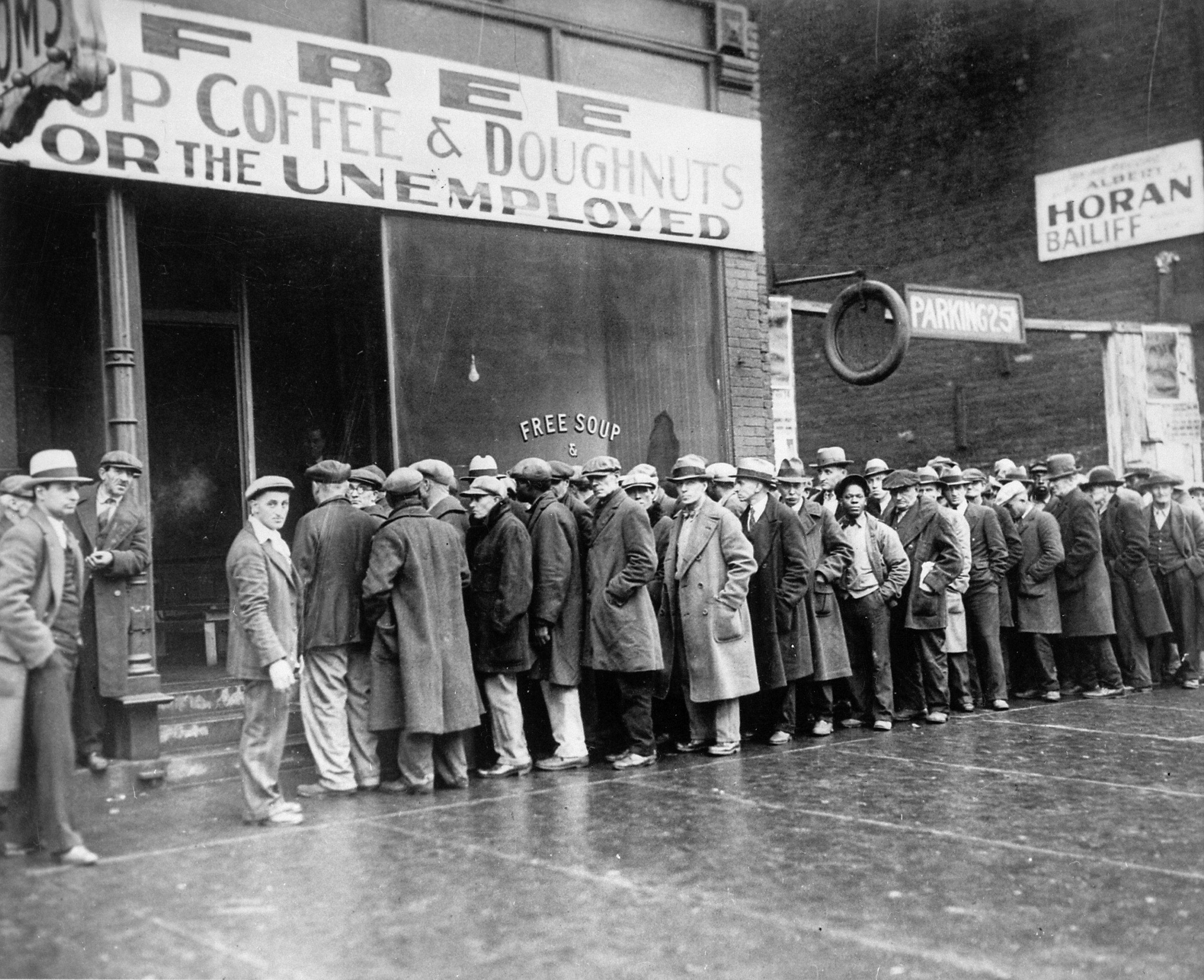
Unemployed men queuing outside a soup kitchen in Chicago during the Great Depression, 1931

The Great Depression hit Chicago hard, with unemployment reaching 28% by early 1931. Mattick lost his job at Western Electric (where employment had fallen to 16,000) in early 1931. He became active with the Proletarian Party, teaching classes on socialist theory, and the Worker Educational Association (WEA), a German-style group fostering self-education and political agitation. He played a central role in reviving the Chicagoer Arbeiter Zeitung (CAZ) on behalf of the Kartell, a coalition of German socialist clubs. Between February and December 1931, Mattick wrote substantial portions of the ten issues published, covering international events, local politics, crisis theory, and the history of the Chicago labor movement. The CAZ faced intense opposition from the Communist Party, which saw it as a rival, leading to a bitter struggle that ultimately contributed to the paper's demise.

In the spring of 1932, Mattick embarked on a months-long tramping tour of the southern United States, traveling by car, foot, and hitchhiking through New Orleans, Pensacola, and Georgia, where he spent two weeks with Seminole Indians. He later spent several months in New York. Henryk Grossman's The Law of Accumulation and Breakdown of the Capitalist System (1929) profoundly influenced Mattick's understanding of Marxist crisis theory, becoming a central theme in his work. He reviewed the book favourably in the Chicagoer Arbeiterzeitung daily that he edited, and initiated correspondence with its author, which lasted from 1931 to 1937. He discussed Grossman's ideas extensively with Reinhold Klingenberg in Berlin and Henk Canne Meijer in the Netherlands.

== Unemployed movement and council communism ==
=== Unemployed movement ===
Returning to Chicago in late 1932, Mattick became deeply involved in the burgeoning unemployed movement. He joined the Workers League, the unemployed affiliate of the Proletarian Party, helping to write and distribute leaflets and speaking at meetings. The unemployed organized by occupying abandoned storefronts, tapping utilities, and soliciting food. Following a 50% cut in food subsidies in October 1932, the Workers League, along with Socialist and Communist unemployed groups, organized a hunger march of over 25,000 people, which successfully pressured authorities to rescind the cuts. This led to the formation of the Federation of Unemployed Workers League of America in November 1932. At its May 1933 conference, Mattick was elected to the Executive Committee, representing the Workers League alongside delegates from various socialist, communist, and Trotskyist factions. The Federation was soon outmaneuvered by larger, better-funded parties, and the radical left's influence waned as welfare authorities centralized relief processes and public works programs began.

In 1933, Mattick's colleagues from the Proletarian Party who were dissatisfied with its direction formed the United Workers Party (UWP). Mattick, though agnostic about the name, was a key figure in this small group, which focused on the unemployed movement and maintained an anti-parliamentary, anti-trade union stance. The rise of fascism in Germany in 1933 deeply impacted the council communists. Mattick was peripherally involved with the revived clandestine journal Proletarier, which featured Karl Korsch. Korsch, a lawyer and former KPD Reichstag member, became an important, albeit sometimes critical, correspondent and influence. Discussions with Korsch and Dutch council communists like Anton Pannekoek, often via Canne Meijer, centered on crisis theory, the nature of the Soviet Union, and the failures of traditional Marxism.

=== International Council Correspondence ===
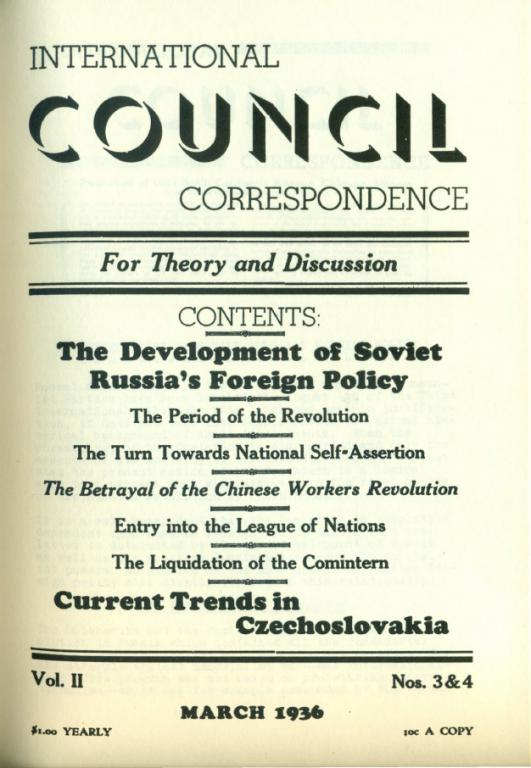
International Council Correspondence cover, 1936

Mattick struggled to publish in English, relying on friends like Kristen Svanum, Max Nomad, and Allen Garman for translation and editing. His interactions with Sidney Hook began supportively, with Hook praising Mattick's critiques of his own work, Towards the Understanding of Karl Marx. However, the relationship soured as Hook became increasingly dogmatic and intolerant of Mattick's views, particularly his criticisms of the American Workers Party (AWP) platform, which Hook had co-authored. Max Eastman and V.F. Calverton, editor of Modern Monthly, were more receptive to Mattick's work on crisis theory, though they also found his English writing style challenging.

In October 1934, the UWP launched the mimeographed journal International Council Correspondence (ICC), with Mattick as the primary contributor and de facto editor. The journal, produced in the Mattick apartment, served as a vehicle for council communist ideas, focusing on economic theory, contemporary political developments, the Soviet Union, and critiques of other left tendencies. Key European council communists, including Korsch and Pannekoek, contributed, though often after much persuasion and with Mattick handling translation and editing. Mattick's pamphlet The Inevitability of Communism (1935), an expansion of his critique of Hook, was published by Polemic Publishers, an imprint associated with Modern Monthly, but received little notice.

The mid-1930s saw Mattick analyze the rise of fascism, the Spanish Civil War, and the foreign policy of the Soviet Union, arguing that these developments were rooted in the ongoing crisis of capitalism. He criticized the Popular Front strategy and the left's support for national bourgeoisies against fascism, maintaining a consistently anti-capitalist and anti-statist position.

=== World War II and Living Marxism ===
As war approached, Mattick's publishing outlets dwindled. ICC was renamed Living Marxism in 1938 and later New Essays in 1942, reflecting a broadening scope but also increasing difficulties. Korsch became a more active collaborator, though their relationship was often marked by theoretical disagreements and Korsch's sometimes patronizing tone. Mattick engaged in debates with Max Nomad over the role of intellectuals and the nature of state capitalism in Russia and fascist Germany. He submitted a manuscript on the unemployed movement to the Frankfurt School (then in New York), but it was not published.

During World War II, Mattick continued to write, focusing on the war as a manifestation of capitalist crisis and critiquing the left's widespread support for the Allied cause. He separated from Frieda in 1940 and began a relationship with Ilse Hamm, a young German émigré and educator he met through Fairfield Porter. Mattick worked briefly at a bookstore and then in a factory developing prototypes for hearing aids, while Ilse worked at a private school. His friendships with Porter and Dinsmore Wheeler provided crucial intellectual and emotional support during this period of personal and political upheaval. New Essays ceased publication in 1943 due to financial difficulties and the death of its printer.

== Post-war years and isolation ==
=== Life in New York ===
After the war, Mattick and Ilse Hamm (now Mattick after their marriage in 1945, following Paul's divorce from Frieda) moved to New York City in May 1946. Their son, Paul Jr., was born in mid-1944. They lived in a loft in Chelsea, which became a hub for a diverse circle of friends, including artists like Willem de Kooning and Nell Blaine, writers, and political exiles such as Josef Kohn and Heinz Langerhans. Zellig Harris and his associates, known as the Frame of Reference for Social Change, also became part of their social set.

Mattick maintained correspondence with his European comrades, including Pannekoek, Alfred Weiland, and Klingenberg, who provided harrowing accounts of post-war conditions in Germany. He organized relief efforts, sending packages of food and clothing. His relationship with Frieda, who had also moved to the U.S. East Coast, remained complex.

In 1948, Mattick traveled to Berlin and Holland, his first visit to Europe in twenty-two years. He met with Pannekoek and Canne Meijer, lectured to revived council communist groups in Berlin, and reconnected with old friends. His efforts to publish Pannekoek's Lenin as Philosopher and Workers' Councils in English faced numerous obstacles but underscored his commitment to preserving and disseminating council communist thought.

=== Vermont and Boston ===
The post-war political climate in the U.S. was inhospitable to radical leftists. Mattick's writing output dwindled significantly; virtually nothing was published between 1952 and 1955. In April 1953, Paul, Ilse, and Paul Jr. moved to a one-room shack on several acres in Jamaica, Vermont, seeking a simpler, self-sufficient life. They spent years renovating and expanding the house, cultivating extensive gardens, and engaging with a local community of subsistence farmers, loggers, and pacifist/anti-conscription activists. Visitors were frequent, including Josef Kohn, Franz Jung, and Nell Blaine.

Mattick's health remained a concern, with recurrent illnesses and lung problems. In 1958, the family moved to Boston so Paul Jr. could attend high school and Ilse could resume her career in early childhood education. She became director of a therapeutic nursery school and later a professor at Wheelock College. Mattick continued to write, though publishing remained difficult. His correspondence with Dinsmore Wheeler and Kenneth Rexroth provided important outlets during this period of "quiet times". He slowly worked on what would become Marx and Keynes, but initial drafts were met with discouragement.

== Later career and rediscovery ==
=== Marx and Keynes ===
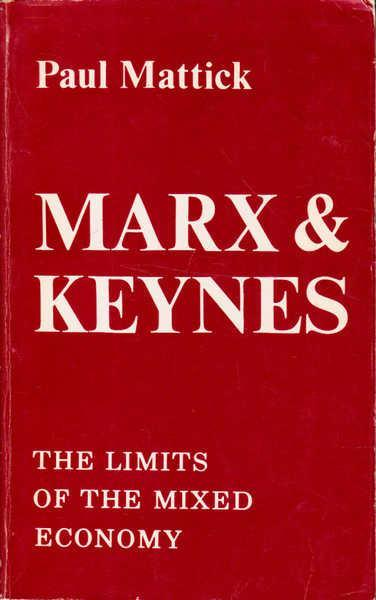
Cover of Marx and Keynes: The Limits of the Mixed Economy (1969)

In the 1960s, new contacts in Europe, particularly Maximilien Rubel in Paris and Roman Rosdolsky, led to a rekindling of interest in Mattick's work. Rubel offered Mattick an outlet in his journal Etudes de Marxologie. Mattick's correspondence with Rosdolsky involved deep theoretical discussions on Marx, crisis theory, and the nature of Soviet-type societies.

The rise of the New Left in the United States brought Mattick into contact with a new generation of radicals. Paul Buhle sought to republish Mattick's earlier journals and essays. Mattick engaged with figures like Gabriel Kolko and Herbert Marcuse, critically assessing their views on contemporary capitalism and the potential for revolutionary change. He was particularly critical of Paul Sweezy's Monopoly Capital, viewing it as an abandonment of Marxist crisis theory.

After decades of effort, Mattick's magnum opus, Marx and Keynes: The Limits of the Mixed Economy, was published in 1969 by Porter Sargent. The book, a critique of Keynesian economics from a Marxist perspective and an elaboration of Grossman's breakdown theory, positioned Mattick as a significant, if heterodox, Marxist thinker. It generated considerable excitement, particularly in Europe.

=== European reception ===
Marx and Keynes sold thousands of copies in Germany, where it was published by Europäische Verlagsanstalt (EVA) and also in a pirated edition. Study groups formed, and Mattick's work became central to New Left discussions on crisis theory and state intervention. Claudio Pozzoli in Italy and Volkhard Brandes in Germany became key figures in editing and promoting Mattick's writings, leading to the publication of numerous books and essay collections in the 1970s.

Mattick undertook several trips to Europe between 1967 and 1973, often accompanied by Ilse. He lectured at universities, participated in conferences, and met with a wide range of New Left activists and intellectuals, including veterans of the May 1968 events in France like Daniel Cohn-Bendit. His reception in Denmark was particularly strong; he held a guest professorship at the experimental Roskilde University in 1974, where Marx and Keynes was a bestseller.

== Final years and death ==
Despite his renewed prominence in Europe, Mattick's reception in the United States remained muted. He continued to write prolifically, working on a critique of bourgeois economics and what would become Marxism: Last Refuge of the Bourgeoisie? (published posthumously in 1983). He maintained an extensive correspondence network, engaging with a new generation of radicals and scholars interested in his work.

Mattick's health deteriorated in the late 1970s. He suffered from anemia, kidney problems, and recurrent pneumonia. His step-son Hans died by suicide in 1978, and his first wife Frieda died in 1980. Paul Mattick died in Cambridge, Massachusetts, on February 7, 1981, after a prolonged illness. His ashes were scattered on his Vermont property.

== Political views ==
Mattick "was hostile to the political parties, conventional trade unions and the Soviet Union, and stressed the importance of spontaneous working-class action". According to one reviewer of Mattick's collected essays, he "denied the possibility that workers could exercise control by means of a party or a government and insisted that all existing systems not based on private capitalism were state-capitalism". Similar to Friedrich Pollock, he drew comparisons between the Soviet, Nazi and New Deal economic policies, regarding them as distinct versions of "the centralisation and concentration process of the capitalist system". He claimed that "a new ruling class of state officials has replaced the old bourgeois capitalists" in the Soviet Union, without providing an analysis of its class structure.

== Personal life ==
Paul Mattick was married twice. His first marriage was to Frieda Olle (1897–1980), with whom he had a complex and often strained relationship. He was stepfather to her children, Hans (1920–1978) and Renee. After their separation in 1940 and subsequent divorce, Mattick married Ilse Hamm (1919–2009) in 1945. They had one son, Paul Mattick Jr. (born 1944), who also became a writer and philosopher.

Mattick maintained a wide circle of friends and correspondents throughout his life, including prominent artists, writers, and political activists in both Europe and the United States. He was known for his sharp intellect, his commitment to radical politics, and his often-blunt conversational style. Despite his intellectual focus, he worked various manual labor jobs for much of his life, from factory apprentice to construction worker, and experienced long periods of unemployment.

== Bibliography ==
- The Masses and the Vanguard
- Council Communism
- Introduction to Anti-Bolshevik Communism
- Capitalism and ecology: from the decline of capital to the decline of the world
- Marx and Keynes: The Limits of the Mixed Economy, Boston: Porter Sargent, 1969
- Anti-Bolshevist Communism in Germany, New York: Telos Press, 26, Winter 1975-76
- Anti-Bolshevik Communism, Wales: The Merlin Press, 1978 (reprinted 2007) ISBN 978-0-85036-223-7
  - 1939: "Karl Kautsky: From Marx to Hitler"
  - 1935: "Luxemburg versus Lenin" (Council Correspondence Vol. 2, no. 1, December 1935)
  - 1935: "The Lenin Legend" (Council Correspondence Vol. 2, no. 1, December 1935)
  - 1947: "Bolshevism and Stalinism", abridged from original in Politics, Vol. 4, No. 2, Mar/Apr 1947
  - 1939: "Council Communism", originally as "Groups of Council Communists" in The Social Frontier, vol. 5, no. 45, May 1939
  - 1945: "Otto Rühle and the German Labour Movement"
  - 1949: "Spontaneity and Organisation"
  - 1962: "Karl Korsch: His Contribution to Revolutionary Marxism"
  - 1965: "Humanism and Socialism", International Socialism (1st series), No.22, Autumn 1965
  - 1960: "Marxism and the New Physics"
  - 1966: "Monopoly Capital"
  - 1967: "Workers' Control"
- Economic Crisis and Crisis Theory, London: Merlin Press, 1981 (transl. Paul Mattick Jr.)
- Marxism: The Last Refuge of the Bourgeoisie?, NY: M.E. Sharpe, 1983 (ed. Paul Mattick, Jr.); NY: Routledge, 2015.
