= Anwar Shaikh (economist) =

American economist (1945–2026)

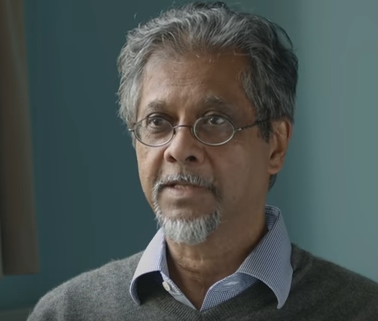
- Born: 22 October 1945; Karachi, Sind Province, British India (present-day Sindh, Pakistan)
- Died: 6 October 2026 (aged 80); New York City, U.S.

Academic background
- Education: Princeton University; Columbia University
- Thesis: Theories of Value and Theories of Distribution (1973)
- Doctoral advisor: Ronald Findlay

Academic work
- Discipline: Heterodox economics, Macroeconomics, Marxian economics, crisis theory
- School or tradition: Classical economics, Marxian economics, radical political economy
- Institutions: New School for Social Research
- Website: Information at IDEAS / RePEc

Anwar Mir Mohammed Shaikh (Sindhi: انور شيخ; 22 October 1945 – 6 October 2026) was a Sindhi American heterodox economist in the tradition of classical political economy and Marxian economics.

Shaikh was Professor of Economics in the Graduate Faculty of Social and Political Science at The New School for Social Research in New York City, where he began teaching in 1972.

== Early life and education ==
Shaikh was born in Karachi on 22 October 1945, into a Liberal Muslim–Christian Sindhi family. Due to his father's employment in the Foreign Service of Pakistan, he traveled extensively at an early age and lived for various lengths of time in Ankara, Washington, D.C., New York City, Lagos, Kuala Lumpur, and Kuwait. He attended a French school in Ankara from the age of six, the Catholic St. Patrick's High School in Karachi from the age of eight, and a school in Washington, DC, from 1958.

He graduated from Stuyvesant High School in New York City in 1961 and received a B.S.E. from Princeton University in 1965. He worked for two years in Kuwait from 1965 to 1967, initially as an bank clerk and engineer, then from 1966 as a mathematics, physics and social sciences teacher at the Kuwait-American School in Kuwait City. He then returned to the United States to study economics with Gary Becker, Robert Heilbroner and Luigi Pasinetti at Columbia University, and completed his Ph.D. under the guidance of Ronald Findlay in 1973. While in graduate school, he taught social science and mathematics at Harlem Preparatory School in Harlem, New York, a private Baháʼí–Catholic establishment founded in 1967 with support from the Astor, Ford and Mosler Foundations.

Shaikh attended talks by Martin Luther King and Malcolm X as a Princeton student, and sympathized with the Black Panthers and the Nation of Islam while in the graduate school at Columbia. In 1968, he took part in the student occupation during the 1968 Columbia University protests. He co-founded the Union for Radical Political Economics but was expelled from the group over getting Joan Robinson to address the Economics Department at Columbia. His major political influences stem from the New Left, including the civil rights movement and feminist movement in the U.S., and national liberation movements abroad.

He always found neoclassical economics unpersuasive, and the quest for more solid foundations led him to the works of John Maynard Keynes, Roy Harrod, Wassily Leontief, Michał Kalecki, Joan Robinson, Piero Sraffa and Luigi Pasinetti, and subsequently to Adam Smith, David Ricardo and Karl Marx. The quest for a modern political economy of developed capitalism became a central theme of his subsequent work.

== Academic career ==
Shaikh joined the Economics Department at the Graduate Faculty of the New School for Social Research in 1972. In 1977, he became one of the original eighteen editors of the Cambridge Journal of Economics. He also contributed to biannual macroeconomic reporting on the U.S. economy at Bard College's Levy Institute.

Carrying on teaching and research that originated in the context of New Left social movements, Shaikh's political economy focused on the laws of motion and empirical patterns of industrialized capitalism, based on a theory of competition independent of neoclassical economics.

In specific fields, he wrote on the labor theory of value, production functions, international trade, neoliberalism, the welfare state, economic growth, inflation, the falling rate of profit, long waves, inequality on the world scale, and past and current global economic crises.

In 2016, Shaikh published Capitalism: Competition, Conflict, Crisis.

The final 36th volume of "Edition Marxismen", a book series introducing Marxist thought, edited by Ingar Solty and published by Brumaire-Verlag, is devoted to Shaikh's work as a theorist of the labour theory of value.

=== Critique of perfect competition ===
Shaikh argued in various publications that neither neoclassical economics nor the great bulk of heterodox economics provides an adequate foundation for the analysis of developed capitalism. The former is based on a vision of a perfect capitalism which is claimed to optimally and efficiently serve the interests of all of its participants.

At the heart of this vision is the theory of perfect competition. Much of heterodox economics is in turn based on the theory of imperfect competition, i.e., on departures from perfect competition. But the theory of imperfect competition is intrinsically dependent on the theory of perfect competition. Shaikh argued that even neo-Ricardian economics, whose revival was sparked by Sraffa's classic work, relies heavily on the neoclassical concepts of perfect competition and of equilibrium as an attained-and-held state.

In place of these notions, Shaikh proposed the theory of "real competition" and the theory of turbulent regulation. Real competition is competition-as-war, with individual firms seeking to undermine each other by lowering costs and cutting prices. Turbulent regulation is the resulting process of perpetual overshooting and undershooting of actual economic variables (such as prices, wages and profit rates) around their ever-moving centers of gravity. Capitalist competition tends to form a "leading (regulating) producer-capital" which "establish the lowest unit cost-price of production at which other firms-prices will gravitate".

He utilized this framework to develop alternate theories of industrial, financial and international competition (the latter rejecting the standard theory of comparative costs). The key element in all cases is the turbulent equalization of profit rates in various spheres of investment. He used his theoretical structures to explain the actual patterns of industrial prices, profit rates, stock market prices, and exchange rates in the developed world.

=== Theory of the profit rate ===
The second strand of Shaikh's work concerns macrodynamics. Once again, the profit rate is the key variable. He argued that capitalist growth is driven by profitability, not by the requirements of full employment as in neoclassical theory, by exogenous demand as in Keynesian theory, or by the savings rate as in Harrodian theory. For Shaikh, profits regulate supply and demand and not the other way around; and "could even determine the degree of state intervention".

In his earlier work, he used this notion to develop a theory of long waves and crises based on the Marxian concept of falling rate of profit. Subsequently, he showed that the link between growth and the profit rate can also provide an alternate theory of inflation, which he showed to work very well for the U.S. in the postwar period.

In later work, he developed a formal classical profit-driven model of growth and contrasted its structure and its policy implications to those of the standard models in the other traditions.

=== Empirical measures of profit ===
A third strand of his work is the relation between theoretical categories and empirical measures. His 1994 book Measuring the Wealth of Nations: The Political Economy of National Accounts, co-authored with Ahmet Tonak, developed a mapping between the national accounts corresponding to neoclassical and Keynesian concepts and those corresponding to classical and Marxian ones. It is now a classic reference on the subject.

Shaikh later argued that it is crucially important to distinguish between the average rate of profit on all capital invested, which includes old and new investments, and the rate of return on new investment alone. It is only the latter, he argued, which is turbulently equalized among alternative uses of capital. He showed that one can approximate the rate of return on new investment via the incremental rate of profit.

Using this, he demonstrated that, contrary to the "irrational exuberance" claim of Robert Shiller, the rate of return in the stock market does indeed oscillate around the incremental rate of return in the corporate sector. In more recent work, he demonstrated that the same turbulent equalization holds for manufacturing sectors within the U.S. and even across OECD countries.

=== Production function critique ===
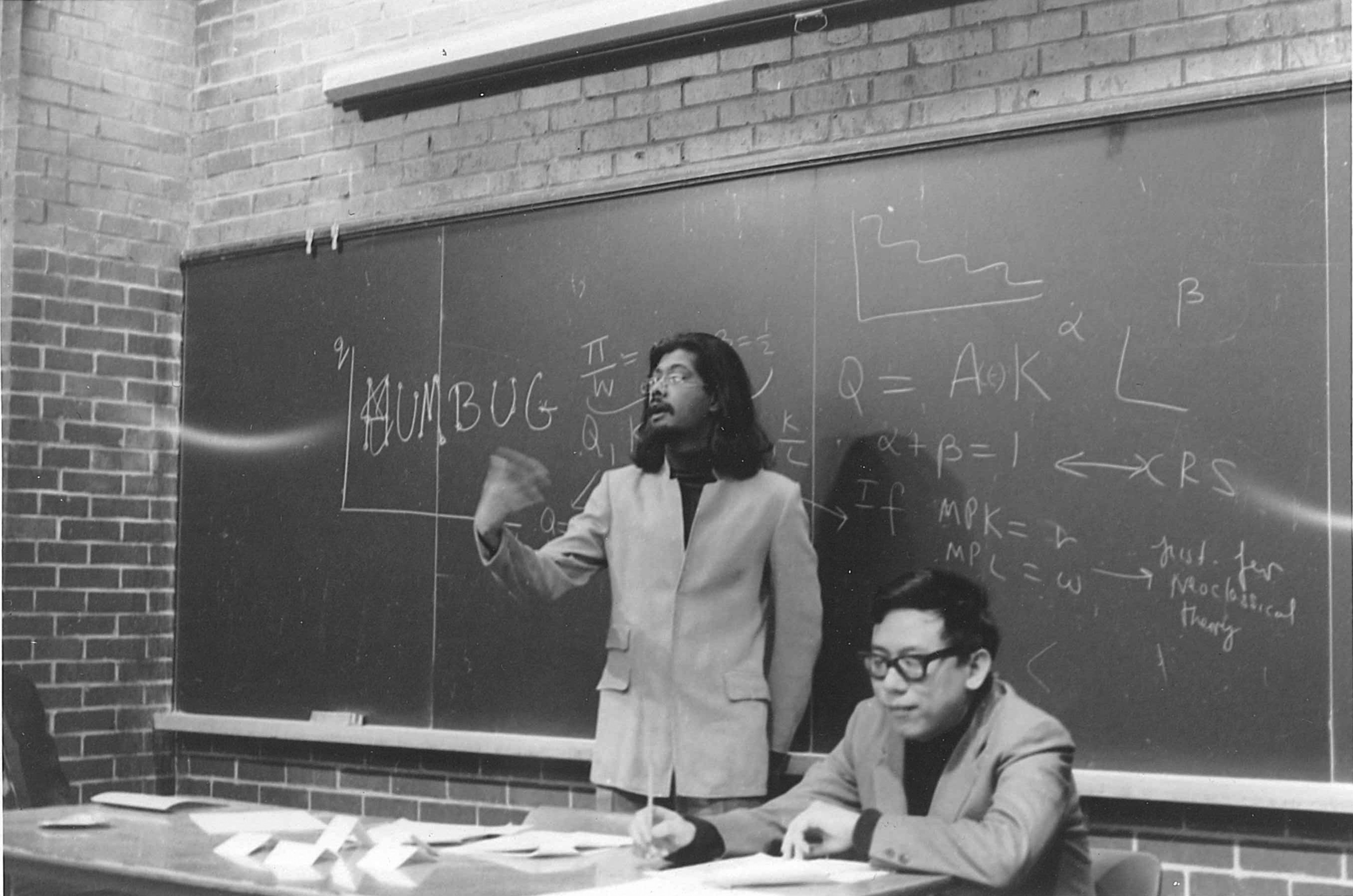
Shaikh's lecture on the "Humbug production function" in 1975.

The final strand of his work is a critique of the neoclassical aggregate production function and its associated marginal-productivity theory of income distribution, dating back to his earliest work 'Laws of Production and Laws of Algebra: The Humbug Production Function' (1974). This was a stinging critique of Robert Solow's famous article on the measurement of technical change, following up on a similar criticism of cross-section production functions by Simon and Levy (1963).

To combat the notion that production functions, if not theoretically sound, are at least empirically well-supported, Shaikh fitted a function to a set of data points that spell out "HUMBUG" when plotted, then showed that the result was a proper production function.

The Simon-Shaikh critique of production functions was taken up by Jesus Felipe, J. S. L. McCombie and others in a series of articles over the years. Further articles by Shaikh in this vein appeared in 1980, 1986, and 2005, the last being in a special journal issue devoted to the subject that included contributions by Felipe, McCombie, and Franklin M. Fisher. Expressing the importance of Shaikh's result, J. E. King remarked that "[i]f there was any justice in the world of economics," Shaikh should have gotten the Nobel Memorial Prize for the humbug production function.

=== Capitalism: Competition, Conflict, Crises ===
Shaikh's 2016 book Capitalism: Competition, Conflict, Crisis is a graduate-level textbook that attempts to revitalize classical political economy, by deriving theoretical and empirical results from classical assumptions. It synthesizes much of his earlier work into a comprehensive theory of micro- and macroeconomics, while critiquing both mainstream neoclassical economics and post-Keynesian alternatives.

== Death ==
Anwar Shaikh died on 6 October 2026, at the age of 80.

== Publications ==
- Valor, acumulación y crisis. Ensayos de economía política (2024), Miami: Ediciones RYR
- Capitalism. Competition, Conflict, Crises (2016), New York: Oxford University Press
- "Globalization and the Myth of Free Trade" (2007), in Globalization and the Myths of Free Trade: History, theory, and empirical evidence, Anwar Shaikh (ed.) Routledge, New York, NY.
- "Nonlinear Dynamics and Pseudo-Production Functions" (2005) in The Eastern Economics Journal, Special Issue on Production Functions.
- "Explaining the Global Economic Crisis: A Critique of Brenner" (1999), Historical Materialism, No. 5.
- "Explaining Inflation and Unemployment: An Alternate to Neoliberal Economic Theory" (1999), in Contemporary Economic Theory, Andriana Vachlou (ed.), Macmillan, London.
- "The Stock Market and the Corporate Sector: A Profit-Based Approach" (1998), in Markets, Unemployment and Economic Policy: Essays in Honour of Geoff Harcourt, Volume Two, Malcolm Sawyer, Philip Arestis, and Gabriel Palma (eds.), Routledge, London.
- "The Empirical Strength of the Labor Theory of Value" (1998), in Conference Proceedings of Marxian Economics: A Centenary Appraisal, Riccardo Bellofiore (ed.), Macmillan, London.
- (with Ertuğrul Ahmet Tonak) Measuring the Wealth of Nations: The Political Economy of National Accounts (1994), Cambridge: Cambridge University Press
- "The Falling Rate of Profit as the Cause of Long Waves: Theory and Empirical Evidence" (1992), in New Findings in Long Wave Research, Alfred Kleinknecht, Ernest Mandel, and Immanuel Wallerstein (eds.), Macmillan Press, London.
- "Wandering Around the Warranted Path: Dynamic Nonlinear Solutions to the Harrodian Knife-Edge" (1992), in Kaldor and Mainstream Economics: Confrontation or Convergence? (Festschrift for Nicolas Kaldor), Edward J. Nell and Willi Semmler, The Macmillan Press Ltd.
- "The Falling Rate of Profit and the Economic Crisis in the U.S." (1987), in The Imperiled Economy, Book I, Union for Radical Political Economy, Robert Cherry, et al. (eds.)
- "The Transformation from Marx to Sraffa" (1984), in Ricardo, Marx, Sraffa, The Langston Memorial Volume, Ernest Mandel, and Alan Freeman (eds.)
- "On the Laws of International Exchange" (1980), in Growth, Profits and Property, Edward J. Nell (ed.), Cambridge University Press, Cambridge.
- "An Introduction to the History of Crisis Theories" (1978), in U.S. Capitalism in Crisis, U.R.P.E., New York.
- "Laws of Production and Laws of Algebra: The Humbug Production Function" (1974), The Review of Economics and Statistics, Volume 56(1), February 1974, p. 115-120.

== Sources ==
- Shaikh, Anwar (2014), "Order in and through Disorder: The Invisible Hand as a Turbulent Regulator", in Michael Szenberg; Lall Ramrattan (eds.), Eminent Economists II: Their Life and Work Philosophies, Cambridge: Cambridge University Press, pp. 338–351, doi:10.1017/CBO9781139629096.025, ISBN 9781107040533
