= International Council Correspondence =

Council communist journal (1934–1943)

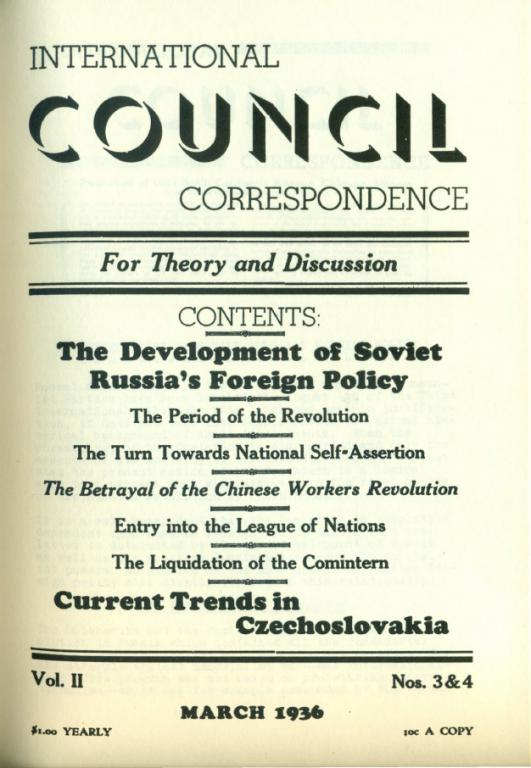
- Cover of Vol. II, Nos. 3&4, 1936
- Discipline: Political science, Economics
- Language: English
- Edited by: Paul Mattick

Publication details
- Former names: Living Marxism (1938–1942); New Essays (1942–1943)
- History: 1934–1943
- Publisher: United Workers Party
- Frequency: Monthly (initially), later irregular
- ISO 4: Find out here

International Council Correspondence was a council communist journal published in the United States from 1934 to 1943. Founded by the Chicago-based United Workers Party, it served as a central voice for the American council communist movement, which was composed of small groups of dissidents from mainstream socialist and communist parties. The German Marxist theoretician Paul Mattick was its primary editor and contributor.

The journal was established to elucidate the principles of council communism, focusing on Marx's theory of economic crisis, critiques of Bolshevism and the Soviet Union, and analyses of contemporary political events from an anti-authoritarian, anti-parliamentary perspective. It was produced with minimal resources, initially as a mimeographed publication collated manually in Mattick's apartment.

In 1938, the journal was renamed Living Marxism to reflect the growing influence of the German Marxist philosopher Karl Korsch, who became a key contributor. Its focus shifted slightly to foster broader discussion and oppose sectarianism within the left. In 1942, the publication's name was changed a final time to New Essays. Plagued by financial difficulties, a small subscriber base, and the challenges of wartime, the journal ceased publication in 1943 after its printer died and replacement costs became prohibitive. Throughout its run, it featured the work of prominent European council communists, including Korsch and Anton Pannekoek.

== History ==
The journal was founded by the United Workers Party (UWP), a small political group established in 1932 by former members of the Proletarian Party of America in Chicago. The Marxist theoretician Paul Mattick, who had been expelled from the Proletarian Party, was the central figure in the UWP and the driving force behind its publications. The first issue of International Council Correspondence (ICC) was published in October 1934, nearly two years after the UWP's formation. The journal's production was rudimentary; it was initially a mimeographed publication with a hand-drawn masthead, manually typed on stencils and collated in Mattick's apartment, which served as both a meeting hall and a workroom for the UWP's editorial group of ten to twenty people. The use of stencils meant that typographical errors could not be easily corrected, and early issues were sometimes published with errors such as missing page numbers.

The journal's name was changed twice during its run. In February 1938, it was renamed Living Marxism, a change that coincided with the increasing involvement of the German Marxist philosopher Karl Korsch, who had recently arrived in the United States. Korsch became a frequent contributor, often writing under various aliases, and to outside observers, he appeared to be the journal's central figure. By late 1938, Living Marxism was struggling financially and appeared only quarterly. Its publication schedule became a "trickle", with only eight issues published in total during 1938 and 1939.

In 1942, as the political climate shifted with the onset of World War II, the journal's name was changed a final time to the "blander" title New Essays, A Quarterly Devoted to the Study of Modern Society. Only three issues of New Essays were ever published. The journal's existence was consistently precarious, hampered by a small subscriber base and constant financial difficulties. The final blow came in 1943 when its printer died. The cost of a new printer was two to three times higher, which was prohibitive. After the Winter 1943 issue of New Essays, the journal ceased publication permanently.

== Content and ideology ==
International Council Correspondence was established as a "vehicle for the elucidation of the ideas of council communism". Its ideological line was anti-Bolshevik, anti-parliamentary, and committed to the principles of workers' self-emancipation through workers' councils. The journal operated at a high theoretical level, modeling itself on European council communist publications like Korsch's Proletarier and the Dutch Rätekorrespondenz.

The journal's content focused heavily on social and economic theory. It was particularly concerned with Henryk Grossman's interpretation of Marx's theory of economic crisis, which Mattick promoted as essential for understanding the trajectory of capitalism. Articles frequently analyzed contemporary events, such as economic policy in industrialized nations, the rise of fascism, developments in the Soviet Union, and the actions of the mainstream trade union and communist movements.

When the journal became Living Marxism in 1938, its statement of purpose was revised to be more circumscribed. It declared that the magazine "consciously opposes all forms of sectarianism" and aimed to "foster discussion rather than assert a point of view." With the final name change to New Essays in 1942, this position was further solidified. The new, simpler preamble stated that "the articles represent the points of view of individual contributors and are not necessarily those of the publishers." This shift reflected both the difficulty in achieving an editorial consensus and the desire to provide a non-dogmatic forum for left-wing thought outside the influence of the major parties.

== Contributors ==
Paul Mattick was the journal's primary force, serving as its de facto editor and most prolific author. He frequently wrote entire issues himself, sometimes using pseudonyms like "Luenika" or omitting his name so the journal would not appear to be a solo effort. Finding other writers was a persistent challenge throughout the journal's existence. Of the Chicago-based editorial group, only Kristen Svanum contributed articles with any regularity.

The journal relied heavily on Mattick's extensive network of contacts in Europe to solicit content. Karl Korsch became a crucial contributor and promoter of the journal after his arrival in the United States in 1936. His essays appeared frequently in Living Marxism, and he helped connect Mattick with other potential writers. The Dutch astronomer and council communist Anton Pannekoek was another key European contributor, as were other members of the Dutch and German radical left.

The final issues of New Essays featured a notable range of authors beyond the core council communist group, including Dwight Macdonald, Victor Serge, Julien Coffinet, and Leo Friedman.
