= Comparison of Marxian and Keynesian economics =

Marxism and Keynesianism are methods of understanding and comparing the works of influential economists John Maynard Keynes and Karl Marx. Both men's works have fostered respective schools of economic thought (Marxian economics and Keynesian economics) that have had significant influence in various academic circles as well as in influencing government policy of various states. Keynes' work found popularity in developed liberal economies following the Great Depression and World War II, most notably Franklin D. Roosevelt's New Deal in the United States in which strong industrial production was backed by strong unions and government support. Marx's work led the way to a number of socialist states, notably the Soviet Union and the People's Republic of China. The immense influence of both Marxian and Keynesian schools has led to numerous comparisons of the work of both economists along with synthesis of both schools.

With Keynes' work stemming from the neoclassical tradition and Marx's from classical economics and German idealism (notably the work of Georg Wilhelm Friedrich Hegel), their understandings of the nature of capitalism varied, but both men also held significant similarities in their work. Both Marx and Keynes saw significant faults within the capitalist system, albeit to varying degrees; this is in opposition to many classical and neoclassical economists who tend to understand that faults within a capitalist system as brought upon by market imperfections and the influence of "exogenous shocks to the macroeconomic system".

With Keynes writing during the height of liberal capitalism and its collapse during the Great Depression, along with his background in mathematics, his macroeconomic methodology focused significantly on using models to explore demand-side economics and the useful yet volatile nature of liberal capitalism. In contrast, Marx's early industrial European context and classical school influence saw him focus on production process, with all economies being established on a mode of production and these processes inherently causing stratification between the capitalist class and working class. However, central to this comparison is the distinction between Keynes' belief in remedying the faults of capitalism while Marx saw capitalism as a stepping stone towards further societal development.

== Views on crisis ==
Unlike their classical and neoclassical contemporaries, both Marx and Keynes understood laissez-faire capitalism as having inherent crisis associated with it. Despite these similarities, both their understanding of capitalist crisis as well as the possible remedies for it differ heavily. Keynes believed that the majority of economic recessions were a result of fluctuating investment within business cycles, with low capital investment resulting in recession and deflation and high investment resulting in boom and inflation. Keynes believed that these business cycles of capitalist economies could be remedied by sufficient interference by the state in order to maintain full employment and a strong economy. His influence over the multiplier theorem was significant in outlining the effectiveness that state economic intervention can have in compensating during economic downturn. Furthermore, Keynes believed that the raising and lowering interest rates could be used as a means of combating economic imbalance. Keynes used his findings to promote counter-cyclical policy, primarily explored within his 1930 work A Treatise on Money. Keynes believed that by lowering interest rates during a recession, investment in the economy would be stimulated, while interest rates could be raised to counter inflation. In broad terms, Keynes believed that the crisis associated with capitalism could be effectively controlled by utilizing effective government policy through both monetary and fiscal means.

In a similar vein to Keynes, Marx believed that crisis is inherent to capitalism. Marx understood crisis as deriving within the capitalist system and as the result of a breakdown within the process of capital accumulation brought upon by imbalances during process of accumulation. These imbalances are primarily caused by general overproduction as brought upon by the desire for capitalists to maximize their attainment of surplus value and the necessity to increase productive capacity to ensure higher returns. However, the lack of effective demand within an economy limits the ability for the entire economy to grow alongside the rise of production. Marx further explored how the failure of overproduction within a single industry can greatly affect the livelihood of workers which can notably be found with his cotton cloth example: "The stagnation of the market, which is glutted with cotton cloth, hampers the reproduction process of the weaver. This disturbance first affects his workers. They now form a part of the temporary surplus population, of the surplus production of workers [...] because there is a surplus production of cotton fabrics on the market."

Marx claims that the interconnected nature of production and markets increases the fragility of both and will therefore have widespread effects on the economy if general overproduction occurs. From here, it can be understood that while both may be critical of the crisis found in capitalism, their interpretations of its foundations differ, with Marx focusing on failure within production whereas Keynes focuses on investment.

== Views on social conflict ==
For Marx and Keynes, their respective understandings of social hierarchy and class conflicts have similar foundations yet substantial differences in their relative understandings. Marx saw class conflict as the primary driver towards social change and development (as per dialectical materialism), with the growing economic divide between the capitalist class and proletariat resulting in class conflict and subsequent socialist revolution. Furthermore, Marx understood this class conflict as inherent within the structure of capitalism as the establishment of hierarchical classes brings with it the foundations on which conflict arises.

In contrast, Keynes viewed social conflict as a fault in capitalism which can be adjusted with public intervention into the economy as "[p]ublic intervention is a more elevated response to a natural state of inter-class conflict which feeds into itself". Keynesian economics therefore acted as a middle-way for many developed liberal capitalist economies to appease the working class in lieu of a socialist revolution. Keynes himself also argued against the creation of a class war, noting that "[t]he class war will find me on the side of the educated bourgeoisie".

Despite these differences, Keynes and Marx both saw that laissez-faire capitalist economies inherently stratify social classes. Nevertheless, Keynes had a significantly more optimistic view in regards to the effectiveness of the state in promoting social welfare and a decent standard or living. On the other hand, Marx was substantially more critical of the dangers posed upon the proletariat inherent within capitalism. For Marx, the fix for the class struggle in a capitalist system is the abolition of class itself and subsequent establishment of socialism.

== Views on unemployment ==
For both Marx and Keynes, analyzing and combating the dangers of unemployment were key to understanding the capitalist system. The majority of the classical and neoclassical orthodoxy agree that Say's law allows for an economy to maintain full employment as the mechanisms of equilibrium within capitalism allow for equality of aggregate supply and demand. However, both Marx and Keynes refute the viability of Say's law occurring within the economy. For Marx, his key to understanding the failures of Say's law stems from his conception of money. While David Ricardo and other classical economists viewed money as a means of circulation, Marx understood money as also being a store of value when kept idle. The hoarding of money can cause for "aggregate demand to fall short of aggregate supply", therefore causing unemployment of labor as firms lessen or stop investment within production. In a similar vein to Marx, Keynes viewed money as more than just a "means of circulation", with a significant distinction between a co-operative economy and entrepreneur economy illustrating the failure of Say's law to prove truthful within the real economy. Keynes himself even acknowledged the developments made by Marx in relation to the co-operative and entrepreneur economy, although he stated that "the subsequent use to which he put this observation was highly illogical".

For Keynes, unemployment within a capitalist economy was deemed as a significant social ill of economies as influenced by his societal context where mass unemployment was widespread following the Great Depression. Keynes saw that the two popular remedies for unemployment, "real wage cuts" and "general austerity", were ineffective in contrast to state intervention within the economy. Keynes believed that government intervention within the economy had the potential to "ensure a quasi-optimal equilibrium", allowing for both increased profits and wages due to the increase in demand of goods.

Keynes viewed that capitalism's strengths could be utilized alongside the controlling of its volatile tendencies, with Keynes wanting to simultaneously assist the working class by rising their wages and the maintaining of full-employment while also allowing for the rise in profits for firms. While both Keynes and Marx understood unemployment as occurring when aggregate demand and supply are not equal, Marx also viewed unemployment as a tool which can be manipulated within a capitalist economy for the benefit of bourgeoisie. Marx believed that the use of the reserve army of labor within a capitalist economy allowed for capitalists to push down wages in production by threatening workers with the potential of replacement. Marx believed that this was utilized by capitalists in order to maximize surplus value and profits, lessening the labor costs within the production process and increasing potential gains. While Keynes viewed unemployment as limiting potential profit due to lack of demand, Marx viewed that the possibility of full employment encroaches on the potential gains of capitalists, hence the utilization of the reserve army of labor.

== Heterodoxy and Keynes–Marx synthesis ==
While both Marxian and Keynesian schools of economics have had significant division and isolation between one another, notably with the Keynesian reluctance to accept the radical and revolutionary aspects of Marxian economics, the rise of the neoliberal global hegemony since the late 20th century that coincided with the resurgence of neoclassical economics and decline of Keynesian economics has generated the antithetical emergence of a heterodox Marxian and Keynesian economic synthesis. This synthesis has found itself prevalent within various heterodox schools, notably post-Keynesians, the social structure of accumulation and structuralist macroeconomics. This heterodox macroeconomic synthesis aims at integrating the economic theories of Marx and Keynes in order to create a theory that is "more coherent, logically consistent, realistic, flexible and capable of explaining modern macrodynamics in historical time", with a Keynes–Marx heterodox synthesis being utilized in order to create a more robust theory allowing for an improved understanding of various new and old economic phenomena.

This is illustrated within Jonathan P. Goldstein's unified heterodox macroeconomic framework which aims to utilize "Keynesian uncertainty", "Marxian class conflict", "Marxian competition" and "Marxian crisis theory" in order to create a "realistic and flexible framework" which "sheds problematic aspects of existing theories and unifies the significant contributions of those theories into a potent approach capable of explaining the contradictory path of capitalist development across different historical eras". The work of Goldstein and his contemporaries aims at homogenizing theories and approaches in order to better understand the workings of the capitalist system, in contrast to the supposed inadequacies found in modern neoclassical economics. Furthermore, the rise in this heterodoxy has increased since the 2008 financial crisis. Goldstein suggests that the unified theory's integrated approach allows for improved analyses of the Great Recession due to "its focus on the interrelations between social classes, the distribution of income, effective demand, Marxian competition, crisis theory, Keynesian uncertainty, financial innovation and fragility, endogenous expectations and structural and institutional change". Furthermore, the unified theory also aims to reach the conclusion that "current corporate form of globalization must be replaced with a more balanced and equitable approach to trade [...] where balanced is achieved across classes and countries with different levels of development".
