= Marx and Keynes: The Limits of the Mixed Economy =

1969 book by Paul Mattick

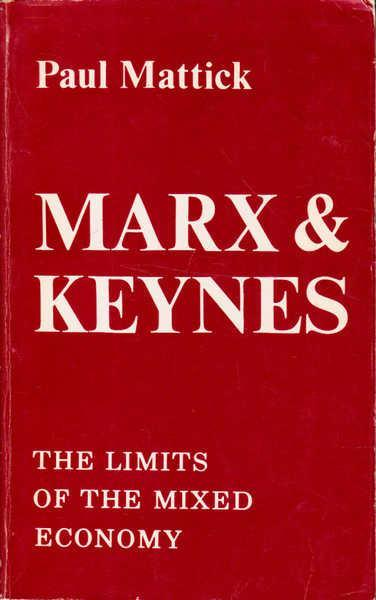
- Cover of the first edition
- Author: Paul Mattick
- Language: English
- Subject: Marxian economics; Keynesian economics; Crisis theory
- Published: 1969
- Publisher: Porter Sargent
- Publication place: Boston, United States

Marx and Keynes: The Limits of the Mixed Economy is a 1969 book of Marxian economics by the council communist Paul Mattick. The book offers a critique of Keynesian economics from a Marxist perspective and argues that the post-war mixed economy was incapable of permanently overcoming capitalism's tendency toward crisis. The culmination of decades of Mattick's theoretical work, the book had a protracted and difficult publication history, appearing two and a half decades after its initial conception. Upon its release, it was Mattick's first book to be published in thirty years.

Marx and Keynes received a muted and often hostile reception in the United States, where it sold poorly. In Europe, however, particularly in West Germany and Denmark, the book was an immediate success, selling thousands of copies and becoming a key theoretical text for the emerging New Left. It established Mattick as a major figure for a new generation of radicals and cemented his reputation as one of the foremost 20th-century critics of mainstream and state-capitalist economics from a council-communist viewpoint.

== Background and writing ==
The theoretical foundations for Marx and Keynes were laid during the 1930s, when Paul Mattick engaged deeply with the crisis theory of Henryk Grossman. Grossman's 1929 book, The Law of Accumulation and Breakdown of the Capitalist System, "restored the Marxian theory of accumulation from oblivion" and profoundly altered Mattick's understanding of Marxism. It provided the basis for his lifelong focus on capitalism's inherent tendency toward breakdown, a core idea of the council communism tradition with which Mattick was associated. Mattick defended Grossman's work against accusations of promoting a mechanistic or fatalistic theory of collapse, noting that for Grossman, "'no economic system, no matter how weakened, collapses by itself... It must be overthrown'".

The project that would become Marx and Keynes began in the late 1940s as a proposed journal article intended to help finance a trip to Europe. Mattick's colleagues, including Max Eastman and Karl Korsch, encouraged him to expand the article into a book. The ideas were developed in a series of essays throughout the post-war decades, most notably in "Dynamics of the Mixed Economy", published in Science & Society in 1964. This essay, according to Mattick's biographer Gary Roth, "presages [his] wider arguments in Marx and Keynes". The writing process was slow, hampered by Mattick's pessimism about his own work and the difficulty of the subject matter. He positioned the book as a bridge between Marx's analysis of the capitalist economy and Grossman's breakdown theory, focusing his critique on government intrusion into both market-based and state-run economic systems.

By early 1953, Mattick had completed a full draft, but it was rejected by the John Day Company as being "far too technical" for a company that needed to sell 5,000 copies to justify an investment. This initiated what Roth called a "saga" that would last for two and a half decades before the book found a publisher. An essay based on the manuscript, titled "Marx and Keynes", was published in The Western Socialist in 1955. This article came to the attention of Maximilien Rubel, a prominent French Marx scholar, who arranged for excerpts to be published in his journal Etudes de Marxologie and in Science & Society.

Despite this renewed interest, the book proposal was rejected by numerous publishers throughout the 1960s, including The Free Press; Little, Brown and Company; Harper & Row; and Doubleday. A breakthrough came in 1967 when Rubel recommended the project to Porter Sargent, an independent press in Boston. After two decades of rejections, Mattick received a book contract in May 1967. He spent another eight months reworking the manuscript to give the disparate essays greater coherence, and the book was finally published in 1969.

== Synopsis ==
Marx and Keynes is a critique of the post-war mixed economy from a classical Marxist perspective, arguing that government intervention could not resolve the underlying contradictions of capitalism. The biography of Mattick by Gary Roth notes that the book "presupposed a knowledge of Marxian theory and mainstream economics" and served as a "testament to the critical depth and intellectual sophistication of the radical left tradition". It presented an analysis of economic development that emphasized the "dysfunctional aspects of the capitalist economy".

Mattick structured the work as an "interconnected collection of essays rather than as a magnum opus". The chapters are grouped into five sections: "Marx and Keynes", "Marxian Economics", "Capitalism in Crisis", "The Mixed Economy", and a concluding section. The book's central thesis is that Keynesian policies, while appearing to stabilize capitalism, merely shift its contradictions. Government-induced production, particularly in the form of "waste production" such as armaments, is used to compensate for the "relative stagnation of private capital production". This process creates an "inflationary process" and leads to a "vicious circle": by stimulating production through government spending, private capital accumulation diminishes; this decline in private accumulation then necessitates further government intervention. For Mattick, this dynamic demonstrates that the mixed economy is inherently unstable:

Unable to return to the conditions of the past and unable to transform itself into a state capitalist system, the mixed economy alternates between stagnation and destruction, between insufficient capital expansion and increased waste production.

— Paul Mattick, in "Dynamics of the Mixed Economy"

The book's analysis drew heavily from Marx's theory of value and his law of the tendency of the rate of profit to fall, which Mattick, following Grossman, saw as central to understanding capitalism's crisis-prone nature. He argued that the "growing organic composition of capital" ultimately limits the expansion of surplus-value, leading to a "breakdown tendency". Mattick was particularly farsighted in his criticisms of Keynesian policies, developing his critique even before their limitations began to unravel in the economic crises of the 1970s.

== Publication and reception ==
The book's publication in 1969 generated what Roth called "a huge amount of excitement". The historian Gabriel Kolko praised it as "a really fundamental and important analytic work", stating, "I think you have saved Marxian economics as an intellectually relevant and respectable tool in this generation".

=== International reception ===
The book was an immediate and widespread success in Europe. Even before its American publication, publishers in Italy, Germany, and Great Britain approached Porter Sargent for foreign rights. Inquiries soon followed from France, Spain, and Japan. Translations were published in Denmark and Sweden, and interest was expressed by publishers in Mexico, Greece, and Portugal. At one point, five different publishers in Italy were pursuing the rights to an Italian translation.

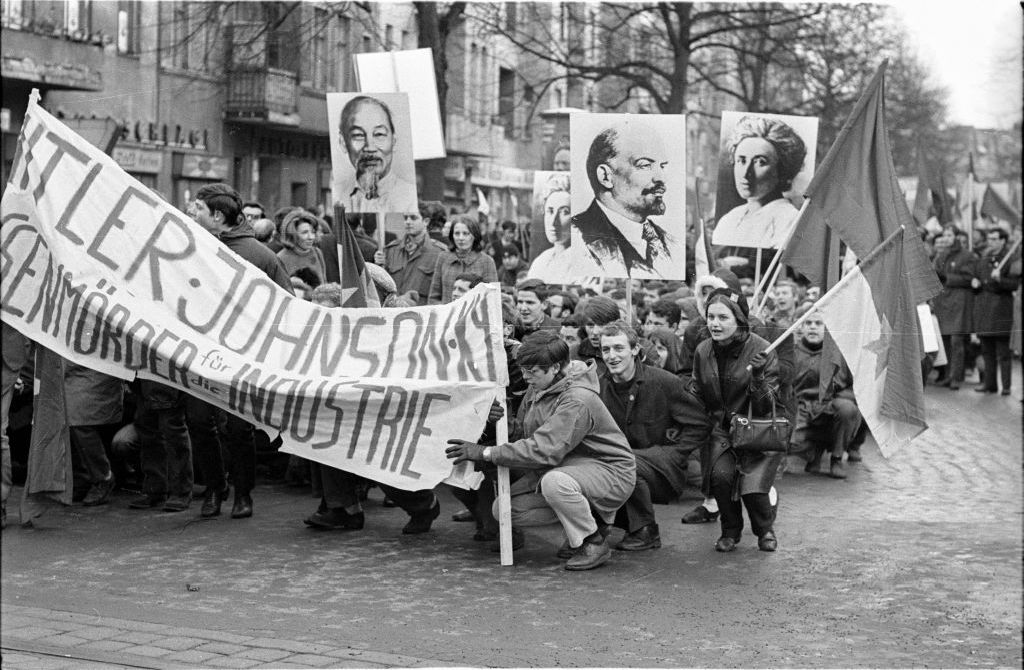
Student protest in West Germany, 1968

The reception was particularly strong in West Germany. A German edition appeared in 1971 and sold thousands of copies. The official edition from Europäische Verlagsanstalt (EVA) was expensive, which led an ad-hoc group to release a pirated version at a quarter of the price. After this edition appeared with printing errors, a second, corrected pirated version was released, selling more than 2,000 copies. Eventually, EVA issued its own cheaper edition. The book became a primary text for student study groups, and Mattick's analysis of the mixed economy was placed at the center of radical debate.

In Denmark, the book was also a "best-seller", with a second edition of 3,000 copies released within a year of its original appearance. By the end of the decade, the Danish edition had sold 7,500 copies.

=== Reception in the United States ===
In contrast to its success in Europe, Marx and Keynes had a muted and often negative reception in the United States. Only 750 copies of the English-language edition were sold in its first year. The Students for a Democratic Society publication Ole Mole printed a favorable review, but this was an "isolated case". The journal Science & Society panned the book for its criticisms of the Soviet Union and Keynesianism. The American Political Science Review dismissed it as a "humdrum textbook" that "reads like the English translation of a German translation of a Hungarian original", a comment suggesting the reviewer had not understood it. The journal Radical America published a long-anticipated review that Mattick criticized for attributing to him views he did not hold. Mattick's circle was also surprised that Monthly Review, then the leading journal of Marxian economics in the US, "failed to even review your book".

== Legacy ==
The book found a wide audience among the student movements of the New Left as the post-war economic boom began to unravel in the early 1970s. It was a key text in the West German student movement's rediscovery of Marx and the history of workers' councils, and it cemented Mattick's status as a leading theorist for a new generation of radicals. Its critique of both free-market capitalism and state-run economies helped shape the radical debate by encouraging a fresh analysis of Marx's relevance for understanding contemporary economic developments. Gary Roth describes the book as "the deepest exploration yet written about governmental economic activities".
