= Modern Quarterly =

Modern Quarterly may refer to:

- Modern Quarterly (American magazine), a politics and art magazine published from 1923 to 1940, and later renamed to The Modern Monthly
- Modern Quarterly (British journal), a Marxist journal published from 1938 to 1953, and later renamed to Marxist Quarterly
