= Chesnais =

Chesnais is a French surname. Notable people with the surname include:

- François Chesnais, French economist and scholar
- Loïg Chesnais-Girard (born 1977), French politician
- Patrick Chesnais (born 1947), French actor, director, and screenwriter
