= Surplus Magazin =

German economics magazine

Surplus
- Editor: Lukas Scholle
- Categories: Economics, business, politics, current affairs
- Frequency: Bi-monthly
- Publisher: Brumaire Verlag
- Founded: 2025
- First issue: February 2025
- Country: Germany
- Based in: Berlin
- Language: German
- Website: surplusmagazin.de

Surplus Magazin is a German economics and business magazine, first published in February 2025. It is based in Berlin and was founded as independent media that covers economic, societal and political topics.

== Views and content ==
Editorially the magazine supports (post-)Keynesian views and considers itself progressive. The editorial board includes Isabella Weber, Adam Tooze and Maurice Höfgen, notable economists whose work includes heterodox economics. The magazine is critical of neoliberalism, advocates state intervention in the market economy and is in the left spectrum of economic reporting.

Topics such as globalization, redistribution, labor and social policy, and technological advances are covered in essays, reports, analyses and interviews. In addition to the editorial board, regular columnists and authors include Mariana Mazzucato, Aya Jaff, Luisa Neubauer, Achim Truger and Thomas Piketty.

== Publication ==
Surplus is published by Brumaire Verlag in Berlin. The magazine is released six times per year. Per their own statement, circulation was at least 7500 by the second issue.

== Reception ==
According to Peter Neumann, writing in Die Zeit, Surplus is one the few economics magazines that do not primarily represent the interests of the wealthy. OXI magazine, which had represented views similar to Surplus, ceased operations in September 2023, and Surplus has filled a gap left in economics journalism. Ingar Solty praised Surplus for this and expressed optimism that the political left would once again be engaged in economic topics. Journalist Anastasia Zejneli wrote in taz that despite Surplus identifying workers as losing out in capitalism, their views aren't directly shared, and claims it remains a magazine for intellectuals.
