= Kuruma Samezō =

Japanese economist (1893–1982)

Kuruma Samezō (久留間鮫造, September 24, 1893 – October 20, 1982) was a Japanese economist. He was professor emeritus at Hōsei University where he ran the Ōhara Institute for Social Research, and was best known as the compiler of a Lexicon of Marxist Political Economy. He is the father of Rikkyō University professor emeritus Kuruma Ken.

== Personal Summary ==
Born to a paper-seller in Okayama-city, Okayama-prefecture, as the eldest son he was expected to take over the family business, and after reading Wealth of Nations he developed an early interest in economics. After attending Okayama Prefectural Middle School and High School number 6, he enrolled in the economics department of Tokyo Imperial University Law School, but after one month he transferred to political science. He graduated after a gap year due to illness, but attended no seminars.

In 1918, he began working for Sumitomo Bank, believing he would be conducting research. The Rice riots of 1918, along with disillusionment with his work, caused him to move towards a socialist perspective and leave his job after only three months. After a stint in his parents’ home, the following February he entered the university's Ōhara Institute for Social Research. Beginning in 1920, he and Kushida Tamizō were dispatched to Europe for two years to gather books and other materials, Kuruma in England and Kuchida in Germany, the results of which proved invaluable to the research institute. From 1923, he lectured for three years on the history of economics at Doshisha University, yet did not take part in the Japanese Capitalism Controversy.

The Ōhara Institute relocated from Osaka to Tokyo in 1936, and Kuruma moved to the capital to continue his research there. The increasing climate of repression did not prevent him from continuing to study Marx, and took an interest in forecasting the postwar economic situation using Marx's ideas on money and inflation. He maintained a system of note cards containing important passages of Marx's writings, which later helped him compile the Lexikon.

The air raids of May 1945 destroyed the Ōhara Institute for Social Research along with all the materials stored there. After the war, along with Institute Chief Takano Iwasaburō, Kuruma occupied himself with rebuilding, until in 1946 upon the recommendation of Ōuchi Hōye he agreed to move the Ōhara Institute to Hōsei University, becoming a professor of political economy, finally receiving his doctorate in 1960. At Hōsei he participated in monthly readings of Marx which included Kōzō Uno, with whom he formed something of a theoretical rivalry. In 1964 he retired as a professor emeritus.

Samezo Kuruma, aimed to complete Marx’s unfinished Crisis theory. Starting from Marx’s observation that the crises of the world market are the ‘real concentration and forcible adjustment of all the contradictions of the bourgeois economy’, Kuruma sought to grasp the inherent contradictions that drove forward and limited capitalism. His focus on the contradictory dynamics of capitalism set him apart from those who try to identify a single, primary cause of crisis.

In his later years he assembled researchers of marxian economics from Hōsei and Rikkyō Universities to compile an encyclopedic “Lexicon of Marxian Economics,” published in a bilingual German-Japanese edition as Marx-Lexikon zur Politischen-Ökonomie. He saw the first three volumes published before dying of lung cancer in 1982.

Among his other teaching positions he served as a professor at Aichi University and as a part-time lecturer on the history of political economy at Tokyo University, Hokkaido University, Gakushūin University, and others.

== Biographical Timeline ==
- 1911 Graduated from Okayama Prefectural Middle School
- 1914 Graduated from Okayama Number Six High School
- 1918 July: Graduated from Tokyo Imperial University Law School. Began working at Sumitomo Bank, but quit after three months
- 1919 February: Researcher at Ōhara Institute for Social Research
- 1920 October: extended stay in Europe with Kushida Tamizō (until August 1922)
- 1923 Lecture at Dōshisha University (history of economics)
- 1946 October: Professor at Hōsei University (history of economics)
- 1949 November: Head of Ōhara Institute at Hōsei University (until April 1966)
- 1960 Receives doctorate in economics (Hōsei University)
- 1964 Retires from Hōsei University as professor emeritus
- 1968 Publishes Marx-Lexikon zur Politischen-Ökonomie (first published by Ōtsuki Booksellers)
- 1982 Dies of lung cancer

== Anecdotes ==
- At Dōshisha University there was reluctance to begin lectures in history of political economy. By a twist of fate he was invited to be head of economic history at Hōsei.
- Upon entering Hōsei University, the board of trustees petitioned for his additional assistance with the university, but when he replied that he had his hands full with problems at the Social Sciences Institute (Ouchi Hyōe's return to Tokyo University, Takano Iwasaburo's recruitment as president of NHK, a lack of assistants), he was told he should bring the Ōhara Institute to Hosei, and in fact the two were merged in 1949.
- When Ōuchi Hyōe reached retirement age and left Tokyo University, he received a large number of job solicitations, but the request of Kuruma with whom he had been friends for 30 years is considered to be a major factor in his choosing to go to Hōsei.
- In Marx-Lexikon zur Politischen-Ökonomie, Tomidzuka Ryōzō’s equilibrium accumulation trajectory theory is described and criticized. Tomidzuka responded with a counterargument, initiating a theoretical dispute between them.

== Published works ==
=== Sole Author ===
- History of Economics (Kawade Library, 1948)
- Studies in Marx’s Theory of Crisis (Hokuryukan, 1949)
- Studies in the Theory of Crisis (Shinhyōron, 1953)
- History of Economics (Hosei University Correspondence School Division, 1956)
- Theory of the Value-Form and Theory of the Exchange Process (Iwanami Books, 1957)
- Supplement to Studies in the Theory of Crisis (Ōtsuki Books, 1965)
- Currency Theory─Currency Formation and its Initial Function (Standard of Value) 1 (Ōtsuki Books
- In Pursuit of Marx’s Theory of Crisis (english trans: Edward Michael Schauerte) (Brill: Chicago, 2024)
- An Introduction to the Study of Crisis Sep. 1929 issue of Journal of the Ohara Institute for Social Research, (vol. VI, no. 1) Translated by Michael Schauerte
- An Inquiry into Marx's Theory of Crisis Sep. 1930 issue of the Journal of the Ohara Institute for Social Research, (Vol. VII, No. 2) Translated by Michael Schauerte
- An Overview of Marx's Theory of Crisis first published in August 1936 issue of 'Journal of the Ohara Institute for Social Research'. Translated by Michael Schauerte

=== Collaborations ===
- (W/ Tamenoi Yoshirō) History of Economics (Iwanami Books, 1954, revised 1977)

=== Edited volumes ===
- Dictionary of Capitalism (Aoki Books, 1961)
- Marx-Lexikon zur Politischen-Ökonomie (Ōtsuki Books, 1968-86)

== Works cited ==
- Ōtani Keinosuke マルクスに拠ってマルクスを編む─久留間鮫造とマルクス経済学レキシコン─ (Marukusu ni yotte Marukusu wo Amu─Kuruma Samezō to marukusu keizaigaku rekishikon) (Ōtsuki Books, 2003)
- Schauerte, Michael "Biography of Kuruma Samezō," https://www.marxists.org/archive/kuruma/biography.htm, accessed Oct 6, 2020
