= Pavel Maksakovsky =

Pavel V. Maksakovsky (1900 – 2 November 1928) was a Russian and Soviet economist.

Maksakovsky was born in 1900 in Ilevo, in Nizhny Novgorod Oblast. His father and brothers were metalworkers, but in 1912 their factory closed down. After four years working on the land, they moved to Ekaterinoslav, Ukraine.

After the Rada declared independence in 1917, Maksakovsky joined the underground resistance. He joined the Bolshevik Party in 1918, volunteering with the Red Army when it reached Ekaterinoslav in 1919. He was captured by Anton Denikin's White Army and sentenced to death, but managed to escape.

From 1920 to 1924, Maksakovsky worked as an instructor at a Bolshevik party school in Sverdlovsk, Ukraine and briefly at the Plekhanov Institute before he was invited to join the Institute of Red Professors in 1925. During this period, he suffered recurring bouts of illness, which ultimately led to his death at the age of 28 in 1928.

His only known work, apart from an article published in the journal Bolshevik in 1928, is The Capitalist Cycle: An Essay on the Marxist Theory of the Cycle, which was published posthumously in 1929 in 3.100 copies by the Communist Academy. An English translation and introduction by Richard B. Day at the University of Toronto Mississauga was published in Historical Materialism Volume 10, Issue 3 in 2002. The translation was later republished in hardcover by Brill Academic Publishers in 2004 and in paperback in 2009 by Haymarket Books. A Swedish translation of the essay was published in the journal Fronesis in 2014.

A brief description of the book is in Crisis theory.
