= Soltys (disambiguation) =

A sołtys is a historical Polish title corresponding to that of elder, e.g., of a village.

Soltys may also refer to:

- Šoltys, a Czech and Slovak surname
- Sołtys (surname)
- Sołtys (video game)
