= Organizational Questions of the Russian Social Democracy =

1904 writing by Rosa Luxemburg

Organizational Questions of the Russian Social Democracy, later republished as Leninism or Marxism?, is a 1904 pamphlet by Rosa Luxemburg, a Marxist living in Germany. In the text, she criticized Vladimir Lenin and the Bolshevik faction of the Russian Social Democratic Labour Party (RSDLP) for their position on democratic centralism—the theory behind a vanguard organization of communists having an elected leadership. Luxemburg argued that "spontaneity" of the proletariat (working class) is a major factor in socialist revolution. It was first published in Iskra, the RSDLP's newspaper, and Die Neue Zeit, the newspaper of the Social Democratic Party of Germany (SPD).

== Background ==
The text was initially published in Iskra, the newspaper of the Russian Social Democratic Labour Party (RSDLP), and Die Neue Zeit, the newspaper of the Social Democratic Party of Germany (SPD).

Integer published an English translation as Revolutionary Socialist Organization in 1934. The U.S. United Workers Party published another English translation in 1935 under the title Leninism or Marxism?. The Scottish Anti-Parliamentary Communist Federation also published it under the title Leninism or Marxism?. Since then the title Leninism or Marxism? has become a common name for the text.

In the 1920s, the U.S. United Workers Party published an English translation. The title Leninism or Marxism? was given to the work by the Scottish Anti-Parliamentary Communist Federation in a 1935 publication, and has since become a common name for the text. It was also published as Revolutionary Socialist Organization (Integer, 1934).

== Synopsis ==
Luxemburg had been following the split at the 2nd Congress of the Russian Social Democratic Labour Party into the Bolsheviks (led by Vladimir Lenin) and the Mensheviks (led by Julius Martov) through her friends Adolf Warski and Leo Jogiches.

In the text, Luxemburg criticized Lenin's One Step Forward, Two Steps Back and his "ultra-centralism" i.e. his approach to democratic centralism. She wrote that he placed too much emphasis on subjective factors—the organization of a revolutionary party—rather than objective factors—the material relationships between classes. Luxemburg argued that "spontaneity" was a major factor in the Russian revolutionary situation: the working class are not driven to uprising by centralized leadership.

The article analyzed that Russia was ruled by a Tsar (an autocracy), rather than by the bourgeois class, as was Germany. Social democracy in Russia would therefore be unable to build a mass political party. However, Luxemburg criticized Lenin's proposed centralism as unable to develop class struggle and build class consciousness among workers.

Luxemburg warned that the Central Committee of the RSDLP may become "the only thinking element" of the party, passing orders to members, who would dictate to the proletariat; however, the proletariat are capable of "spontaneous creativeness". She argued against Blanquism—the pursuit of socialist revolution through a small group of highly organized people.

== Analysis ==
Charles F. Elliott in the Midwest Journal of Political Science commented that the writing, typical of Luxemburg's work, shows an "obsessive distrust of organization and bureaucracy as inherently conservative". Elliott believed that Luxemburg was proven wrong by Lenin's tactical flexibility, which he claims "she lacked", and the Bolshevik's "focus on building a mass movement around the revolutionary leadership".

Robin D. G. Kelley found that Luxemburg was "both a champion and an unsparing critic of Russia's revolutionary leadership": she was closer to Lenin than the leadership of the SPD on many matters and although she gave criticism to the Bolsheviks, she "never broke ranks" with them." She wanted revolution in Russia to succeed"; however, she believed that it would become "deformed" unless revolution also took place in Germany and spread throughout Europe.

Bertram Wolfe wrote that though her tone is "remarkably gentle", Luxemburg was "offended in her whole being" by Lenin's support for democratic centralism and opposition to spontaneity. However, his interpretation was met with criticism by Sheila Delany in The Massachusetts Review; she criticized Wolfe's publication of the pamphlet as Leninism or Marxism? on the grounds that Luxemburg would not "formulate the question so mechanically".
