= Paul Mattick Jr. =

Marxist theorist

Paul Mattick Jr. (born 1944) is an American Marxist political writer, philosopher and retired professor.

== Biography ==
He is the son of German emigres Paul Mattick Sr. (1904–1981) and Ilse (Hamm) Mattick (1919–2009). He was involved in the council communist group Root and Branch, which sporadically published a magazine/pamphlet series, starting in 1969. Other members included Jeremy Brecher, Alice Comack, Martin Comack, Frieda Cyker, Peter St Clair, Elizabeth Long, William Russell, Elizabeth Jones, George Scialabba, and Peter Rachleff. The group also sponsored public meetings; speakers included Ralph Miliband, Christian Wolff, Cornelius Castoriadis, Richard Lewontin, Frank Marquart, Paul Mattick, and others.

Mattick obtained his PhD in philosophy from Harvard University in 1981, under the supervision of Hilary Putnam. He subsequently taught philosophy at the New England Conservatory of Music, Bennington College, and Adelphi University, among other institutions.

He was the editor of the International Journal of Political Economy. He has been the field notes (politics) editor of The Brooklyn Rail since 2014.

== Works ==
- Social Knowledge: An Essay on the Nature and Limits of Social Science, London: Hutchinson, 1986 (reissued with new preface, 2020)
- Eighteenth-Century Aesthetics and the Reconstruction of Art (ed.), Cambridge: Cambridge University Press, 1993, ISBN 0521431069
- Art in Its Time: Theories and Practices of Modern Aesthetics, London: Routledge, 2003, ISBN 0415239214
- Business as Usual: The Economic Crisis and the Failure of Capitalism, London: Reaktion Books, 2011, ISBN 9781861898012
- Theory as Critique: Essays on Capital, Leiden: Brill, 2018
- The Return of Inflation: Money and Capital in the 21st Century, London: Reaktion Books, 2023, ISBN 1789147913
- Freud, Dora, and the Confusion of Tongues (with Arnold W. Rachman), London: Routledge, 2023
