= Council Communists (US organization) =

- Leader: Paul Mattick
- Founded: 1934
- Dissolved: 1943
- Split from: Proletarian Party of America
- Newspaper: International Council Correspondence
- Ideology: Council communism
- Political position: Far-left

In 1934 a group of left communists within the Industrial Workers of the World (IWW) joined with a dissident faction of the Proletarian Party to form the United Workers Party. The group soon changed its name to Groups of Council Communists or simply the Council Communists.

Originally based in Chicago, the group's main activity was producing its journal International Council Correspondence, which was called Living Marxism when the group transferred to New York in 1938 and New Essays in its final issues in 1942 and 1943. The group published important articles by Paul Mattick, Anton Pannekoek, Karl Korsch and the first English translation of Rosa Luxemburg's Organizational Questions of the Russian Social Democracy. Its most important original work may have been The Inevitability of Communism by Paul Mattick, the first book length critique of Sidney Hook's Towards the Understanding of Marx. Hook thought the work important enough to attempt to get it published by a mainstream publisher.

The periodical, which was originally produced with voluntary labor, increased readership inversely to the growth of membership in the organization. The journal gained readers as the group lost members. Shortly after the entry of the US into the Second World War interest in radicalism began to fade. When the cost of producing the journal became too expensive to accommodate its circulation the group was dissolved and the periodical folded.

== Pamphlets ==
- The Inevitability of Communism New York: Polemic Publishers, 1936
- World-wide fascism or world revolution? Manifesto and program of the United Workers Party of America. Chicago: United Workers Party of America, 1934
- Bolshevism or Communism: On the Question of a New Communist Party and the “Fourth” International Chicago: United Workers Party of America, 1934
- What next for the American workers? Chicago: United Workers Party, 1934
- Outline Study Course in Marxian Economics, 1935 (the original edition)
