= Crisis theory =

Economic theories regarding cyclical recessions

Crisis theory, concerning the causes and consequences of the tendency for the rate of profit to fall in a capitalist system, is associated with Marxian critique of political economy, and was further popularised through Marxist economics.

== History ==
Earlier analysis by Jean Charles Léonard de Sismondi provided the first suggestions of the systemic roots of Crisis. "The distinctive feature of Sismondi's analysis is that it is geared to an explicit dynamic model in the modern sense of this phrase ... Sismondi's great merit is that he used, systematically and explicitly, a schema of periods, that is, that he was the first to practice the particular method of dynamics that is called period analysis". Marx praised and built on Sismondi's theoretical insights.

Rosa Luxemburg and Henryk Grossman both subsequently drew attention to both Sismondi's work on the nature of capitalism, and as a reference point for Karl Marx. Grossman in particular pointed out how Sismondi had contributed to the development of a series of Marx's concepts including crises as a necessary feature of capitalism, arising from its contradictions between forces and relations of production, use and exchange value, production and consumption, capital and wage labor. His "inkling ... that the bourgeois forms are only transitory" was also distinctive.

John Stuart Mill in his Of the Tendency of Profits to a Minimum which forms Chapter III of Book IV of his Principles of Political Economy and Chapter V, Consequences of the Tendency of Profits to a Minimum, provides a conspectus of the then accepted understanding of a number of the key elements, after David Ricardo, but without Karl Marx's theoretical working out of the theory that Frederick Engels posthumously published in Capital, Volume III.

Marx's crisis theory, embodied in " ... the law of profitability did not appear until the publication of [Capital] Volume Three in 1894. Grundrisse was not available to anybody until well into the 20th Century ... " and therefore was only partially understood even among leading Marxists at the beginning of the twentieth-century. His notes, 'Books of Crisis' [Notebooks B84, B88 and B91] remain unpublished and have seldom been referred to. A relatively small group including Rosa Luxemburg and Lenin attempted to defend the revolutionary implications of the theory, while others, first Eduard Bernstein and then Rudolf Hilferding, argued against its continued applicability, and thereby founded one of the mainstreams of revision of the interpretation of Marx's ideas after Marx.

Henry Hyndman had written a short history of the crises in the 19th century in 1892, attempting to present, popularise and defend Marx's theory of crisis in lectures delivered in 1893 and 1894 and published in 1896. Max Beer also asserted the centrality of Marx's crisis theory in his pedagogic contributions The Life and Teaching of Karl Marx 1925 and his A Guide to the Study of Marx: An Introductory Course for Classes and Study Circles 1924. In the late 1920s and early 30s, Max Beer worked at the Institut fur Sozialforschung and was a friend of Henryk Grossman.

It was Henryk Grossman in 1929 who later most successfully rescued Marx's theoretical presentation ... 'he was the first Marxist to systematically explore the tendency for the organic composition of capital to rise and hence for the rate of profit to fall as a fundamental feature of Marx's explanation of economic crises in Capital.' Apparently entirely independently Samezō Kuruma was also in 1929 drawing attention to the decisive importance of Crisis theory in Marx's writings, and made the explicit connection between Crisis theory and the theory of imperialism.

Following the extensive setbacks to independent working class politics, the widespread destruction both of people, property and capital value, the 1930s and '40s saw attempts to reformulate Marx's analysis with less revolutionary consequences, for example in Joseph Schumpeter's concept of creative destruction and his presentation of Marx's crisis theory as a prefiguration of aspects of what Schumpeter, and others, championed as merely a theory of business cycle. "... more than any other economist [Marx] identified cycles with the process of production and operation of additional plant and equipment".

A survey of the competing theories of crisis in the different strands of political economy and economics was provided by Anwar Shaikh in 1978 and by Ernest Mandel in his 'Introduction' to the Penguin edition of Marx's Capital Volume III particularly in the section 'Marxist theories of crisis' (p. 38 et seq) where it appears that Mandel says more about the theoretical confusion on this question at that time, even among thoughtful and influential Marxists, than offering an excursus or introduction to Marx's crisis theory.

There have been attempts particularly in periods of capitalist growth and expansion, most notably in the long Post-War Boom to both explain the phenomenon and to argue that Marx's strong statements of its 'lawlike' fundamental character under capitalism have been overcome in practice, in theory or both. As a result, there have been persistent challenges to this aspect of Marx's theoretical achievement and reputation. Keynesians argue that a "crisis" may refer to an especially sharp bust cycle of the regular boom and bust pattern of "chaotic" capitalist development, which, if no countervailing action is taken, could continue to develop into a recession or depression.

It continues to be argued in terms of historical materialism theory, that such crises will repeat until objective and subjective factors combine to precipitate a resolution of the underlying class struggle in a social transition to the new mode of production either by sudden collapse in a final crisis, or gradual erosion of the basing on competition and the emerging dominance of cooperation.

== Causes of crises ==
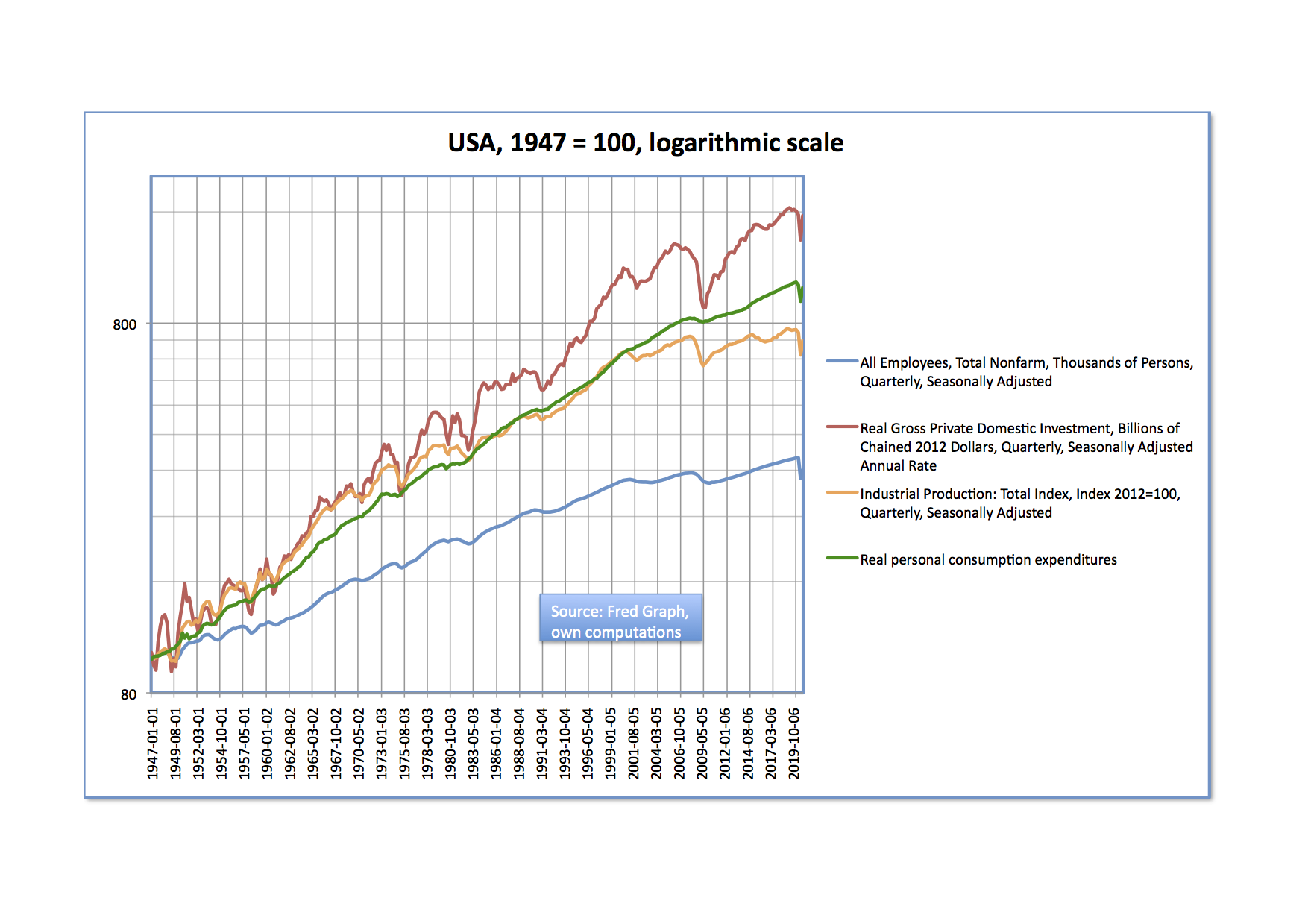
Employment, production, consumption, and investment in the USA

The concept of periodic crises within capitalism dates back to the works of the Utopian socialists Charles Fourier and Robert Owen and the Swiss economist Léonard de Sismondi. Karl Marx considered his crisis theory to be his most substantial theoretical achievement. He presents it in its most developed form as Law of Tendency for the Rate of Profit to Fall combined with a discussion of various counter tendencies, which may slow or modify its impact." Roman Rosdolsky observed that "Marx concludes by saying that the law of the tendency of the rate of profit to fall is in every respect the most important law of modern political economy ... despite its simplicity, it has never before been grasped and even less consciously articulated ... It is from the historical standpoint the most important law." A key characteristic of these theoretical factors is that none of them are natural or accidental in origin but instead arise from systemic elements of capitalism as a mode of production and basic social order. In Marx's words, "The real barrier of capitalist production is capital itself".

The law of the falling rate of profit, the unexpected consequence of the profit motive, is described by Marx as a "two-faced law with the same causes for a decrease in the rate of profits and a simultaneous increase of the mass of profits". "In short, the same development of the social productivity of labour expresses itself in the course of capitalist development on the one hand in a tendency to a progressive fall of the rate of profit, and on the other hand in a progressive increase of the absolute mass of the appropriated surplus value, or profit; so that on the whole a relative decrease of variable capital and profit is accompanied by an absolute increase of both."

== Crisis or cycles? – alternative Marxist theories of crises ==
In 1929 the Communist Academy in Moscow published "The Capitalist Cycle: An Essay on the Marxist Theory of the Cycle", a 1927 report by Bolshevik theoretician Pavel Maksakovsky to the seminar on the theory of reproduction at the Institute of Red Professors of the Communist Academy. This work explains the connection between crises and regular business cycles based on the cyclical dynamic disequilibrium of the reproduction schemes in volume 2 of Capital. This work rejects the various theories elaborated by "Marxian" academics. In particular it explains that the collapse in profits following a boom and crisis is not the result of any long term tendency but is rather a cyclical phenomenon. The recovery following a depression is based on replacement of labor-intensive techniques that have become uneconomic at the low prices and profit margins following the crash. This new investment in less labor-intensive technology takes market share from competitors by producing at lower cost while also lowering the average rate of profit and thus explains the actual mechanism for both economic growth with improved technology and a long run tendency for the rate of profit to fall. The recovery eventually leads to another boom because the lag for gestation of fixed capital investment results in prices that continue such investment until eventually the completed projects deliver overproduction and a crash.

There is a long history of interpreting crisis theory, rather as a theory of cycles than of crisis.

" ... in the course of his investigations, Marx was critically dealing with the contemporary literature on the 1866 crisis and its aftermath. In this sense, Marx was at least partially involved in the same intellectual milieu from which emerged both Juglar’s (1862; 1892) works on business cycles and Bagehot’s (1873) study on financial regulation."

An example of other interpretations: Peter D. Thomas and Geert Reuten in their 2014 "Crisis and the Rate of Profit in Marx's Laboratory" suggests controversially that even Marx's own critical analysis can be claimed to have transitioned from the former toward the latter.

== Similarities (and differences) in the work of J. S. Mill and Marx ==
There are several elements in Marx's presentation which attest to his familiarity with Mill's formulations, notably Mill's treatment of what Marx would subsequently call counteracting tendencies: destruction of capital through commercial revulsions §5, improvements in production §6, importation of cheap necessaries and instruments §7, and emigration of capital §8.

"In Marx's system, as in Mill's the falling rate of profit is a long-run tendency precisely because of the "counteracting influences at work which thwart and annul the effects of this general law, leaving to it merely the character of a tendency." These counteracting forces are as follows: (1) An increase in the intensity of exploitation (via intensification of labor or the extension of the working day); (2) Depression of wages below their value ... (3) Cheapening of the elements of constant capital (via increased productivity); (4) Relative overproduction (which keeps many workers employed in relatively backward industries, such as luxury goods, where the organic composition of capital is low); (5) Foreign trade (which offers cheaper commodities and more profitable channels of investment); and (6) The increase of "stock capital" (interest bearing capital, whose low rate of return is not averaged with others).

Again, like Mill, Marx indicates the post-crisis waste of capital which restores profitability, but this is not mentioned specifically as a counter-tendency until the cyclical nature of the system is demonstrated. On the other hand, Mill does not refer to depression of wages below their value, relative overpopulation, or the increase in "stock capital". But on the most important counter-tendencies, that is, the effects of increasing productivity at home in cheapening commodities and of foreign trade in providing both cheaper goods and greater profits, Marx and Mill are in accord."

== Application ==
It is a tenet of many Marxist groupings that crises are inevitable and will be increasingly severe until the contradictions inherent in the mismatch between the relations of production and the development of productive forces reach the final point of failure, determined by the quality of their leadership, the development of the consciousness of the various social classes, and other "subjective factors".

Thus, according to this theory, the degree of "tuning" necessary for intervention in otherwise "perfect" market mechanisms will become more and more extreme as the time in which the capitalist order is a progressive factor in the development of productive forces recedes further and further into the past. But the subjective factors are the explanation for why purely objective factors such as the severity of a crisis, the rate of exploitation, etc., do not alone determine the revolutionary upsurge. A common example is the contrast of the oppression of the working classes in France in centuries prior to 1789 which although greater did not lead to social revolution as it did once the complete correlation of forces appeared.

Kuruma in his 1929 Introduction to the Study of Crisis ends by noting "... my use of the term "theory of crisis" is not limited to the theory of economic crisis. This term naturally also encompasses the study of the necessity of imperialist world war as the explosion of the contradictions peculiar to modern capitalism. Imperialist world war itself is precisely crisis in its highest form. Thus, the theory of imperialism must be an extension of the theory of crisis."

David Yaffe, in his application of the theory in the conditions of the end of the Post War Boom in the early 1970s, made an influential link to the expanding role of the state's interventions into economic relations as a politically critical element in attempts by capital to counteract the tendency and find new ways to make the working class pay for the crisis.

== Influence ==
Crisis theory is central to Marx's writings; it helps underpin Marxists' understanding of a need for systemic change. It is controversial; Roman Rosdolsky said "The assertion that Marx did not propose a 'breakdown theory' is primarily attributable to the revisionist interpretation of Marx before and after the First World War. Rosa Luxemburg, Henryk Grossman [and Kuruma Samezō] rendered inestimable theoretical services by insisting, as against the revisionists, on the breakdown theory." More recently David Yaffe 1972,1978 and Tony Allen et al. 1978,1981 in using the theory to explain the conditions at the end of the post-war boom of the 1970s and 1980s re-introduced the theory to a new generation and gained new readers for Grossman's 1929 presentation of Marx's Crisis theory.

Rosa Luxemburg lectured on the 'History of Theories of Economic Crises' at the SPD's Party School in Berlin (possibly in 1911, since the typescript includes a reference to statistics from 1911).

Henryk Grossman's re-presentation of both the central importance of the theory for Marx and the working out of its elements in a partially mathematical form was published in 1929. Central to the argument is the claim that, within a given business cycle, the accumulation of surplus from year to year leads to a kind of top-heaviness, in which a relatively fixed number of workers have to add profit to an ever-larger lump of investment capital. This observation leads to what is known as Marx's law of the tendency of the rate of profit to fall. Unless certain countervailing possibilities are available, the growth of capital out-paces the growth of labour, so the profits of economic activity have to be shared out more thinly among capitals, i.e., at a lower profit rate. When countervailing tendencies are unavailable or exhausted, the system requires the destruction of capital values in order to return to profitability. Hence creating the underlying preconditions for post-war boom.

Paul Mattick's Economic Crisis and Crisis Theory (published by Merlin Press in 1981) is an accessible introduction and discussion derived from Grossman's work. François Chesnais's (1984, chapter Marx's Crisis Theory Today, in Christopher Freeman ed. Design, Innovation and Long Cycles in Economic Development Frances Pinter, London), discussed the continuing relevance of the theory.

Andrew Kliman's work examines the logical consistency of Marx's theoretical framework, specifically addressing criticisms that have been raised against Marxian theory since the 1970s.

Francois Chesnais has provided an important exploration of the 'fictitious capital' or 'Finance Capital' aspects of the theory in a review of both historical and contemporary empirical research.

Guglielmo Carchedi and Michael Roberts in their edited collection World in Crisis [2018] provide a valuable review of the empirical analyses that support and defend the thesis, with contributions from authors in the UK, Greece, Spain, Argentina, Mexico, Brazil, Australia and Japan.

== Difference between Marxist economists and Keynesians ==
Keynesian economics, which attempts a "middle way" between laissez-faire, unadulterated capitalism and state guidance and partial control of economic activity, such as in the French dirigisme or the policies of the Golden Age of Capitalism, attempts to address such crises with the policy of having the state actively supplying the deficiencies of unaltered markets.

Marx and Keynesians approach and apply the concept of economic crisis in distinct and opposite ways. The Keynesian approach attempts to stay strictly within the economic sphere and describes 'boom' and 'bust' cycles that balance out. Marx observed and theorised economic crisis as necessarily developing out of the contradictions arising from the dynamics of capitalist production relations.

"Where Marx differs from Keynes is precisely on the question of the falling rate of profit. It is not the propensity to consume or subjective expectations about future profitability that is crucial for Marx. It is the rate of exploitation and the social productivity of labour that are the key considerations and these in relation to the existing capital stock. While for Keynes the low marginal productivity of capital has its cause in an over-abundance of capital in relation to profit expectations, and therefore to a 'potential' over-production of commodities (the capitalist will not invest). For Marx the overproduction of capital is only relative to the social productivity of labour and the existing exploitation conditions. It represents an insufficient mass of surplus-value in relation to total capital. So that for Marx the crisis is, and can only be, resolved by expanding profitable production and accumulation, while for Keynes, it can supposedly be remedied by increasing 'effective demand' and this allows for government induced-production." Yaffe noted in 1972 that "... passages in Volume III referring to the underconsumption of the masses in no way can be interpreted as an underconsumptionist theory of crisis. The citation usually given in support of an 'underconsumptionist theory of crisis' is Marx's statement that "The last cause of all real crises always remains the poverty and restricted consumption of the masses as compared to the tendency of capitalist production to develop the productive forces in such a way, that only the absolute power of consumption of the entire society would be their limit." The above passage contains within it no more than a description or a restatement of the capitalist relations of production. Marx called it a tautology to explain the crisis by lack of effective consumption ..."

Other explanations have been formulated, and much debated, including:

- The tendency of the rate of profit to fall. The accumulation of capital, the general advancement of techniques and scale of production, and the inexorable trend to oligopoly by the victors of capitalist market competition, all involve a general tendency for the degree of capital intensity, i.e., the "organic composition of capital" of production to rise. All else constant, this is claimed to lead to a fall in the rate of profit, which would slow down accumulation.
- Full employment profit squeeze. Capital accumulation can pull up the demand for labor power, raising wages. If wages rise "too high," it hurts the rate of profit, causing a recession. The interaction between the employment rate and the wage share has been mathematically formalised by the Goodwin model.
- Overproduction. If the capitalists win the class struggle to push wages down and labor effort up, raising the rate of surplus value, then a capitalist economy faces regular problems of excess producer supply and thus inadequate aggregate demand and its corollary the underconsumptionist theory. On which Engels comments "the underconsumption of the masses, the restriction of the consumption of the masses to what is necessary for their maintenance and reproduction, is not a new phenomenon. It has existed as long as there have been exploiting and exploited classes. The underconsumption of the masses is a necessary condition of all forms of society based on exploitation, consequently also of the capitalist form; but it is the capitalist form of production which first gives rise to crises. The underconsumption of the masses is therefore also a prerequisite condition for crises, and plays in them a role which has long been recognised. But it tells us just as little why crises exist today as why they did not exist before"
- The Post Keynesian economics debt-crisis theory of Hyman Minsky.
- A variety of theories of Monopoly Capitalism have also been propounded as attempts to explain through exogenous factors, why the tendency might not become apparently manifest in periods of capital accumulation, under various historical circumstances.

== See also ==
- Capital, Volume III
- Tendency of the rate of profit to fall
- Theories of imperialism
- Dependency theory
- Super-exploitation
- Criticisms of Marxism
- Economic collapse
- Late capitalism
- List of economic crises
- Marxism
- Neoliberalism
- Organic crisis
- Underconsumption
- Critique of political economy
