= Šoltys =

Šoltys (feminine: Šoltysová), Šoltýs (feminine: Šoltýsová), Šoltis (feminine: Šoltisová), or Šoltés (feminine: Šoltésová), are Czech and Slovak variants of a surname literally meaning an occupation of šoltys, ultimately derived from German occupation of Schultheiß, head of a municipality or ruler's official. Other variants (possibly used by the same person within Austria-Hungary) include Soltis, Soltisz, Soltiš, Szoltisz. Notable people with the surname include:

- Anton Šoltýs (1937–2022), Slovak alpine skier
- Anton Šoltis (born 1976), Slovak football midfielder and manager
- Dávid Šoltés (born 1995), Slovak ice hockey player
- Elena Maróthy-Šoltésová (1855–1939), Slovak writer, editor, and leading figure in the women's movement in Slovakia
- Igor Šoltes (born 1964), Slovenian lawyer and politician
- Jana Gantnerová-Šoltýsová (born 1959), Slovak former alpine skier
- Július Šoltés (1935–1990), Slovak merited pedagogue and physicist
