= Ferdinand K. Levy =

Professor of Economics and Academic Administrator

Ferdinand K. Levy was a distinguished economist and management scientist with several important contributions to economics and management science. He was a professor at Georgia Tech from 1972 until his retirement in 2005. In particular he was famous for research on and contributions to the Critical Path Method (CPM) and Program Evaluation and Review Technique (PERT).

Ferdinand K. Levy had a varied career beginning with quality control manager and later plant manager of a folding carton plant in New Orleans. After returning to college and receiving his doctorate in economics in 1964 under the tutelage of the late Nobel laureate Herbert Simon at Carnegie Mellon University, he served on the faculties of Stanford University, Rice University (where he held an endowed chair), Georgia Institute of Technology (where he also served as dean of the College of Management for five years), as a visitor at the University of Chicago, and City University of Hong Kong where he was the foundation dean of its College of Management from 1991 to 1995. In 1981, Levy was one of the founders and faculty members of the first management college in China. He retired from Georgia Tech in 2005.

Levy the co-authored of three books on economics and two on production scheduling and author or co-author of over 50 journal articles. In 2000 he became the first professor in management ever to be awarded the outstanding graduate professor award at Georgia Tech where he twice won the MBA teaching award. He holds honorary degrees from three Chinese universities and is a member of honorary scholastic fraternities in physics, the humanities, and business administration. He also was awarded the Alexander Henderson Award in Economic Theory while at Carnegie-Mellon, and his doctoral dissertation was honored by the American Economic Association.

Professor Levy enjoyed a varied and international consulting career. Internationally, he has been a consultant to the Ford Foundation in establishing the Nigerian Institute of Management which he headed for two years in Ibadan, Nigeria, the China Enterprise Management Association for which he lectured and consulted to Chinese factories throughout that country, six Chinese Universities that he assisted in setting up management curricula, Japan Energy Corporation, Aoyama Gakuin University (Tokyo), and the World Bank and various enterprises and universities in Jakarta, Singapore, and Kuala Lumpur. He has served on corporate and nonprofit boards. In the United States, he has testified before the United States Congress on higher education financing and to the Federal Aviation Authority. He has consulted to companies such as Mellon Financial Corporation, Texas Commerce Bank, First City National Bank of Houston, Georgia Power Company, Houston Natural Gas Company, Tenneco, National Service Industries, Brown and Root, Exxon Corporation, Lexecon, Scientific Games, the Grand Rapids, Denver, Los Angeles, and the Port Authority of New York and New Jersey airports, etc. He is also well known for his expert witness appearances in major lawsuits involving antitrust matters, intellectual property, and airport rate and charges to airlines. Five cases in which he has participated have been heard before the US Supreme Court where his trial testimony set the stage for his sides’ wins.

Levy was born in New Orleans, Louisiana USA in 1931. He died in 2026 in Atlanta, Georgia USA, where he resided for more than fifty years.
