= V. F. Calverton =

Victor Francis Calverton
- Born: George Goetz; 1900; Baltimore, Maryland, U.S.
- Died: 1940 (aged 39–40)
- Education: Johns Hopkins University
- Occupations: Writer; literary critic; magazine editor
- Writing career
- Pen name: Victor Francis Calverton
- Language: English
- Years active: 1923–1940
- Period: 1923–1940
- Subjects: Politics; literary criticism
- Movement: Left-radical

Victor Francis Calverton was the pseudonym of George Goetz (1900–1940), an unaffiliated American left-radical writer and literary critic.

== Life ==
Calverton was born George Goetz, in Baltimore in 1900, the son of Charles and Ida Janette Geiger Goetz. He graduated with an AB from Johns Hopkins University in 1921. Calverton founded the Modern Quarterly, wrote 18 monographs and was editor of An Anthology of American Negro Literature (1929). Calverton married twice; his second wife was actress and social worker Nina Melville.

== Works ==
Calverton founded the Modern Quarterly, a politics and arts magazine which ran from 1923 to 1933. From 1933 until his death in 1940 it continued as The Modern Monthly. It was notable for publishing opposing views within the same issue and supporting the work of black intellectuals.

== Reception ==
Calverton was praised by Harold Cruse for advocating an American version of Marxism not beholden to European models.

== Bibliography ==
- The Newer Spirit: A Sociological Criticism of Literature. New York: Boni & Liveright, 1925.
- Sex Expression in Literature. New York: Boni & Liveright, 1926.
- The Bankruptcy of Marriage. New York: The Macaulay Company, 1928.
- The New Ground of Criticism. Seattle: University of Washington Book Store, 1930.
- Three Strange Lovers. New York: The Macaulay Company, 1930. [fiction; three stories]
- American Literature at the Crossroads. Seattle: University of Washington Book Store, 1931.
- For Revolution. New York: The John Day Company, 1932.
- The Liberation of American Literature. New York: Charles Scribner's Sons, 1932.
- The Passing of the Gods. New York: Charles Scribner's Sons, 1934.
- The Man Inside; being the record of the strange adventures of Allen Steele among the Xulus. New York: Charles Scribner's Sons, 1936. [fiction; a fantasy novel]
- Where Angels Dared to Tread. Indianapolis: The Bobbs-Merrill Company, 1941.
