= Peter Thomas (political theorist) =

Australian political theorist and academic (1972/73–2026)

Peter D. Thomas (1972 or 1973 – October 11, 2026) was an Australian political theorist and academic. A Marxist scholar, he studied Antonio Gramsci.

== Life and career ==
Thomas was born in 1972 or 1973, was raised in Rockhampton and went to high school in Southport. From 1992 to 2000, he studied at the University of Queensland where he became a Marxist under the guidance of Dan O’Neill, his English professor. He also studied in Amsterdam, Berlin, Naples, and Rome. He completed his doctoral studies in Amsterdam. He later moved to London.

Thomas worked alongside Trotskyists in Brisbane, though never was an official member of a Trotskyist group. In 2009, he published The Gramscian Moment: Philosophy, Hegemony and Marxism, written during a time when Italy's leftist political sphere was growing in size and strength. The book won awards. He was a professor at the Brunel University of London, serving as head of its Department of Social and Political Sciences from c. 2021 until his death.

Thomas was married to Sara Farris, with whom he had two daughters. He was fluent in English, German and Italian. He died on October 11, 2026, aged 53, in London, from a heart attack he suffered while on a run.

== Select publications ==
- The Gramscian Moment: Philosophy, Hegemony and Marxism (2009)
- In Marx's Laboratory: Critical Interpretations of the Grundrisse (2013)
- The Government of Time: Theories of Plural Temporality in the Marxist Tradition (2017)
- Radical Politics: On the Causes of Contemporary Emancipation (2023)
