= Sołtys (surname) =

Sołtys is a surname. Notable people with the surname include:

- Darlene M. Soltys (born 1965), Associate Judge on the Superior Court of the District of Columbia
- Mieczysław Sołtys (1863–1929), Polish composer, conductor, teacher, musician and public figure
- Nikolay Soltys (1974–2002), the 466th fugitive to be placed on the FBI's Ten Most Wanted list
- Stanisław Sołtys (1433–1489), birth name of Stanisław Kazimierczyk, Polish Roman Catholic priest
