= François Chesnais =

French economist and scholar (1934–2022)

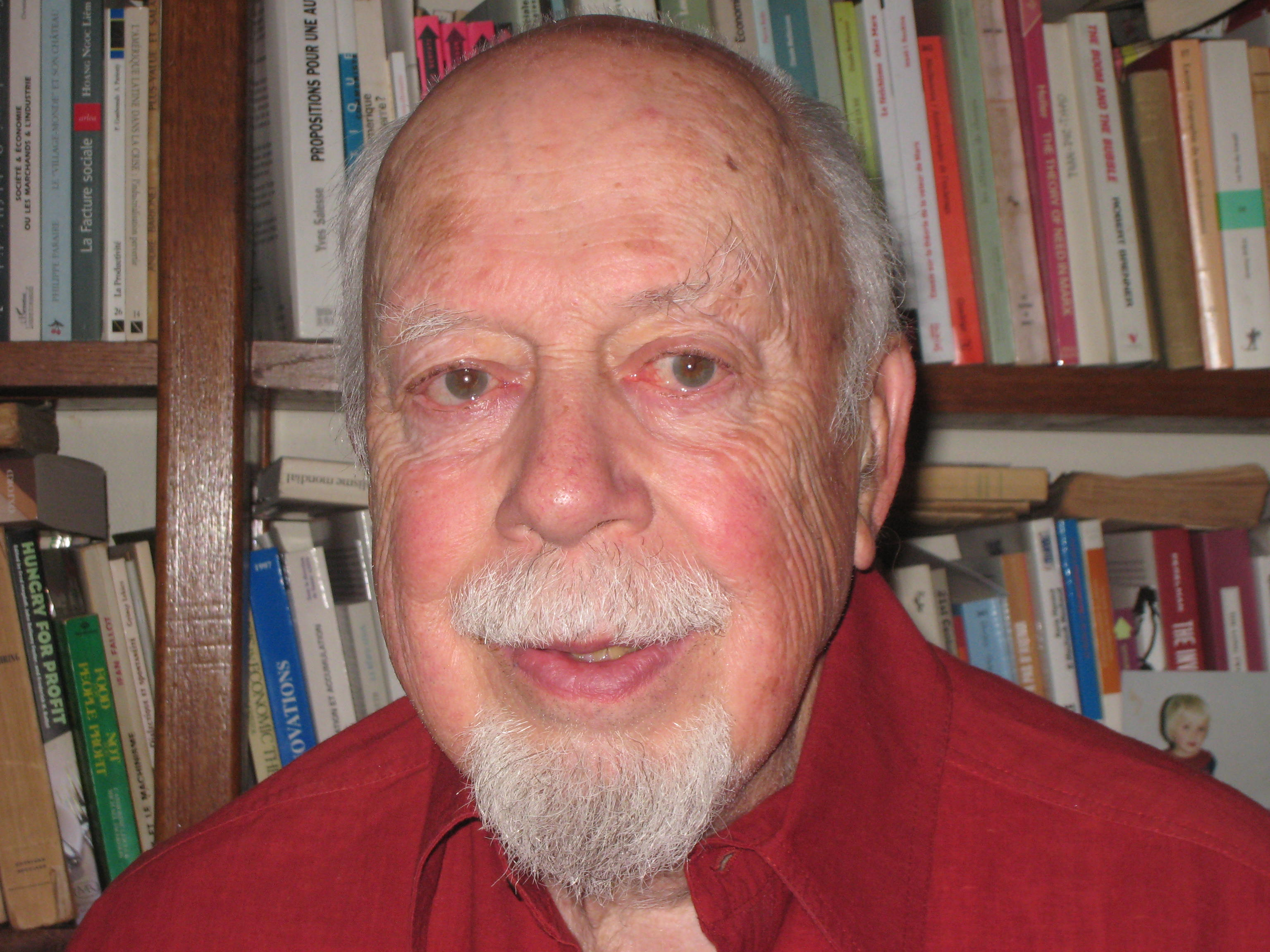
- Chesnais in 2020
- Born: 22 January 1934; Montreal, Canada
- Died: 28 October 2022 (aged 88); Paris, France
- Occupations: Economist, scholar
- Political party: Internationalist Communist Party (France); Internationalist Communist Organisation; New Anticapitalist Party

François Chesnais (22 January 1934 – 29 October 2022) was a French economist and scholar.

== Life and career ==
Chesnais was born in Montreal on 22 January 1934. He was a member of the Scientific Council of ATTAC-France, the author of several books and numerous articles on economics and a founder of the Marxist journal Carré Rouge.

Chesnais was a member of the New Anticapitalist Party. He died at a hospital in Paris on 29 October 2022, at the age of 88.

== Books ==
- Marx's Crisis Theory Today in Christopher Freeman ed. Design, Innovation and Long Cycles in Economic Development 2nd ed. Frances Pinter, London, 1984
- The globalization of capital, Paris: Syros Editions, 1994 (first edition) and 1997 (revised edition)
- Actualiser l’économie de Marx, Actuel Marx Confrontation, Presses Universitaires de France, Paris, 1995
- La mondialisation financière : genèse, coûts et enjeux (directeur de publication et deux chapitres), Syros, Collection Alternatives économiques, Paris, 1996,
- Tobin or not Tobin : une taxe internationale sur le capital (L'Esprit frappeur, 1999)
- Mondialisation : le capital rentier aux commandes in Les Temps Modernes, n°607, janvier-février 2000.
- Que se vayan todos ! Le peuple argentin se soulève avec Jean-Philippe Divès, Éditions Nautilus, Paris, 2002.
- Mondialisation et impérialisme Odile Castel, François Chesnais, Gérard Dumesnil...[et al.] Paris Éd. Syllepse, 2003
- La finance mondialisée : racines sociales et politiques, configuration, conséquences - Sous la direction de François Chesnais, La Découverte, 2004
- Les dettes illégitimes - Quand les banques font main basse sur les politiques publiques. Paris, Éd. Raisons d'Agir, juin 2011. ISBN 978-2-912107-60-2
- Finance Capital Today: Corporations and Banks in the Lasting Global Slump. Brill, Leiden & Boston, 2016; Haymarket Books, Chicago, IL, 2017
