= Modern Quarterly (American magazine) =

Modern Quarterly was a left leaning but unaffiliated radical politics and arts magazine begun by V. F. Calverton in 1923. The magazine was based in Baltimore. From 1928 to 1932, Samuel D. Schmalhausen served on the editorial board and the magazine began to publish work examining sex relations through the lens of psychoanalysis. The magazine had a Marxist approach, but also had individual and political toleration. It carried articles on anthropology, psychology, sociology, medicine, literary criticism, and the problems of colored people.

From 1933 until Calverton's death in 1940 it continued as The Modern Monthly, though it faded in prominence through the 1930s. During this period it adopted an anti-Stalinist approach. It was notable for publishing opposing views within the same issue and supporting the work of black intellectuals. The magazine ceased publication in 1940.
