= Ingar Solty =

German writer (born 1979)

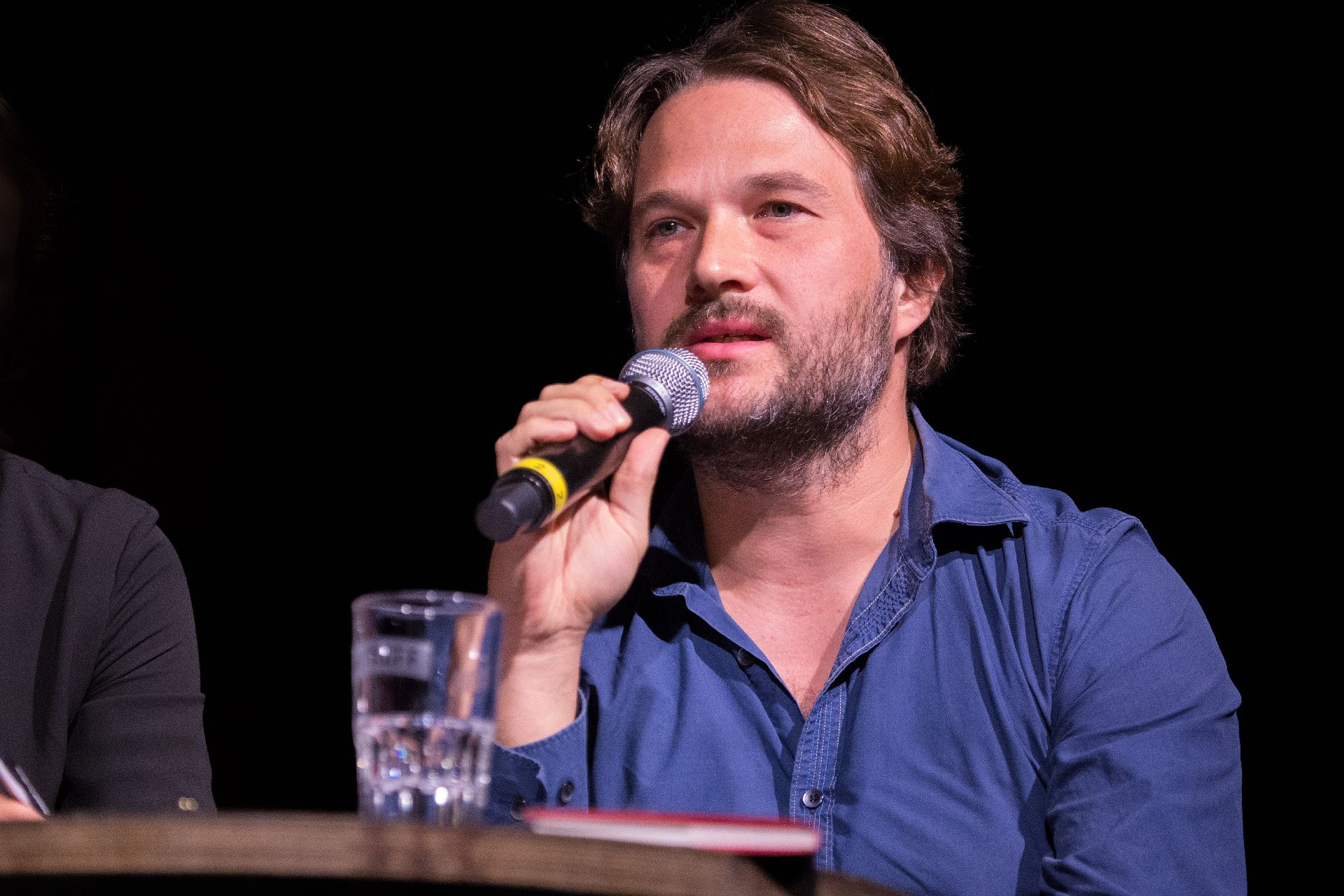
- Ingar Solty in 2018
- Born: 14 April 1979 (age 47)
- Education: York University PhD
- Occupation: Political scientist

Ingar Solty (born 14 April 1979) is a German political writer and journalist focusing on marxism, socialism and the left. He received his PhD from York University in Toronto, Canada.

Solty is a Senior Research Fellow in Foreign, Peace and Security Policy at the Rosa Luxemburg Foundation’s Institute for Critical Social Analysis in Berlin. He founded the North Atlantic Left Dialogue, an annual summit of left-wing intellectuals, also organized by the Rosalux. He is also the social movements and politics editor in the German periodical Das Argument.

== Selected books ==
- Der neue Imperialismus. Distel Verlag, Heilbronn 2004 (with Frank Deppe). ISBN 3-92934-835-7
- Imperialismus. Papyrossa Verlag, Cologne 2011 (with Frank Deppe and David Salomon). ISBN 3894384395
- Die USA unter Obama. Argument Verlag, Hamburg 2013. ISBN 3-86754-312-7
