= Law of value =

Concept in Karl Marx's critique of political economy

The law of the value of commodities (German: Wertgesetz der Waren), known simply as the law of value, is a central concept in Karl Marx's critique of political economy first expounded in his polemic The Poverty of Philosophy (1847) against Pierre-Joseph Proudhon with reference to David Ricardo's economics. (Note: See Marx, The Poverty of Philosophy, chapter 1 part 2 where Marx refers to Proudhon's own "law of value" and chapter 3, titled "Application of the Law of the Proportionality of Value".) Most generally, it refers to a regulative principle of the economic exchange of the products of human work, namely that the relative exchange-values of those products in trade, usually expressed by money-prices, are proportional to the average amounts of human labor-time which are currently socially necessary to produce them within the capitalist mode of production. (Note: Karl Marx, Capital, Volume I, Penguin, pp. 676–77; Marx, Capital, Volume III, Penguin ed., p. 522.)

Thus, the fluctuating exchange value of commodities (exchangeable products) is regulated by their value, where the magnitude of their value is determined by the average quantity of human labour which is currently socially necessary to produce them (see labor theory of value and value-form). Theorizing this concept and its implications preoccupied Marx for more than two decades.

When Marx talked about "value relationships" or "value proportions" (German: Wertverhältnisse), he did not mean "the money" or "the price". Instead, he meant the ratio of value (or 'worth') that exist between products of human labour. These relationships can be expressed by the relative replacement costs of products as labour hours worked. The more labour it costs to make a product, the more it is worth and inversely the less labour it costs to make a product, the less it is worth. Money-prices are at best only an expression or reflection of Marx's value relationships—accurately or very inaccurately. Products can be traded above or below their value in market trade and some prices have nothing to do with product-values at all (in Marx's sense) because they refer to tradeable objects which are not regularly produced and reproduced by human labour, or because they refer only to claims on financial assets.

== Theorizing the value of labour-products ==
The "law of value" is often equated with the "labour theory of value", but this is strictly speaking an error, for five reasons.

- The law of value only states a general regulative principle about the necessary and inevitable relationship between the trading values of commodities, and the socially average labour-time required to supply them. It is simply a law governing commodity exchange.
- The labour theory of value in economics aims to explain how that determination actually work, what kinds of causal relationships are involved, how the law of value interacts with other economic laws, etc.
- For Marx himself, the "labour theory of value" referred only to the theory of value upheld by some of the classical political economists from William Petty to David Ricardo, who regarded human labour as the real substance of product value.
- Marx's own value theory is not a theory of all value, but only of the value-system involved in commodity production and commodity trade.
- Marx never referred to his own theory as a "labour theory of value"; his own critique of the political economists was, that they all failed to explain satisfactorily how the determination of product-value by labour-time actually worked—they assumed it, but they did not explain it consistently (see below). Thus, Marx often regarded himself as perfecting a theory which had already existed for a long time, but which had never been consistently presented before.

Nevertheless, in the Marxist tradition, Marx's theory of product-value is conventionally labeled "the labour theory of value"—while controversy persists about how much Marx's theory actually differs from that of the classical political economist.

=== Gold referent ===
In Das Kapital Marx normally thinks of the quantity of labour that determines product-value as the ratio between the average total amount of labour-time required to produce a reproducible good, and the corresponding average amount of labour required to produce a unit of gold (see also gold standard). (Note: "Throughout this work I assume that gold is the money commodity, for the sake of simplicity." – Karl Marx) Already in 1844, long before he wrote Das Kapital, Marx was very aware of credit money. (Note: "The nations which are still dazzled by the sensuous glitter of precious metals, and are therefore still fetish-worshippers of metal money, are not yet fully developed money-nations. Contrast of France and England.") (Note: "In developed capitalist production, the money-economy appears only as the basis of the credit-economy. The money-economy and credit-economy thus correspond only to different stages in the development of capitalist production...") Whereas "commodity money" (coinage or bullion) played an important role in the earlier stages of capitalist development, the growth of integrated capital markets meant increased use of credit money. Marx felt that the initial assumption of gold-money as a standard of value was justified, in analysing the capitalist relations of production and distribution. Thus, as follows:

X quantity of product = Y quantity of average labour hours = Z quantity of gold-money

For Marx, the value of a commodity is determined by socially necessary labor time, or the amount of time "required to produce an article under the normal conditions of production, and with the average degree of skill and intensity". Marx rejects contra-classical political economy, any notions of the "value of labor" or "price of labor". Instead, it is labor itself (more specifically, abstract labor or general human labor) which is constitutive of value, the substance of value. Consequently, it is not labor, but labor-power (the general human capacity for labor) which has value —a value determined, as in the case of every other commodity, by the labour time necessary for the production, and consequently also the reproduction, of this special article." The importance of labour is its ability to preserve capital value, increase already existing value, and create wholly new value. How any individual happens to regard a particular product normally cannot change that social valuation at all; it's simply a "social fact" in the same way as "the state of the market" is a social fact, even though particular products can at any time trade at prices above or below their socially established value.

Marx realized very well, that the assumption of gold-money was a simplification—there might not be such a stable relationship between price-levels, average commodity values, and gold quantities — but he regarded the assumption as helpful, in explaining the basic laws of motion [Bewegungsgesetze] of the capitalist mode of production "in its ideal average". (Note: "...we are only out to present the internal organization of the capitalist mode of production, its ideal average, as it were." – Karl Marx)

=== Formalization ===
While Marx used the concept of the law of value in his works Grundrisse, A Contribution to the Critique of Political Economy, Theories of Surplus Value and Das Kapital, he did not explicitly formalise its full meaning in a mathematical sense, and therefore how it should be exactly defined remains to some extent a controversial topic in Marxian economics. Different economists dispute how the proportionality between exchange-value and labour-time should be mathematically understood or modeled, and about the measures which are relevant.

Underlying this debate are difficult conceptual questions about how the causal relationships in the economy between price relativities and time worked should be understood. Marx's analysis of value was dialectical, in the sense that he thought value phenomena could only be understood dynamically, holistically and relationally, but he did not spell out all the conceptual, quantitative and logical implications of his position with great exactitude. The scholarly debate about those implications continues even today.

== Basic definition of the concept ==
=== Supply and demand ===
Excess demand can raise the prices of products traded, and excess supply can lower them; but if supply and demand are relatively balanced, the question arises of what regulates the settled exchange-ratios (or average price-levels) of products traded in that case, and this is what the law of value is intended to explain. According to the law of value, the trading ratios of different types of products reflect a real cost structure of production, and this cost structure ultimately reduces to the socially average amounts of human labor-time required to produce different goods and services.

=== Cost structures and price structures ===
Simply put, if product A takes 100 hours of human work to produce in total, and product B takes 5 hours to produce, the normal trading-ratio of A and B will gravitate to a rate of around 1:20 (one of A is worth 20 of B), because A is worth much more than B. Moreover, if A and B are combined and used up to make product C in 40 hours, then product C is likely to be worth the equivalent of around 145 hours of human work in total, including the work of actually making product C. For that reason, most market trade in products is regular and largely predictable as far as price levels are concerned, rather than chaotic and arbitrary. According to Marx, price movements were not simply random, arbitrary or chaotic, but governed by causal laws that limited price variability.

The concept of a cost structure refers to the (direct and indirect) current labour inputs required to make a product, reflected in its price level. The concept of a price structure refers to the fact that prices rarely exist, or change, in isolation; instead, price-levels are interdependent on other price-levels, so that, if some prices would change, a lot of other prices would start to change as well—transmitting a change in valuation across the economy. A structure exists if there is a fairly stable relationship across time between price-levels which are interdependent. Marx argues that the cost structures and price structures for products are, in general, determined by the law of value.

=== Terms of exchange ===
The law of value originates in the "terms of exchange" established for different products. If a producer has to supply too much of his own product to get a different product, this has direct consequences for the additional time he has to work to sustain himself and the trading of his product. Over time, and with more market integration, relatively stable values for products are established in accordance with production norms which exist independently of the productivity of individual producers. In that situation, each producer has to adapt his own production to those socially accepted values, the average terms of trade for products vary only within fairly narrow margins, and thus producers' activities fall under the sway of the law of value, which links "the economy of labour-time" with "the economy of trade". Paradoxically, as Marx says, the more that the producers become dependent on exchange, the more exchange appears to become independent of them. Product-markets begin to operate according to their own laws, to which the producers can only adjust themselves. If some prices go up, many other prices will go up as well because people have to cover their increased costs. If some prices go down, many other prices will go down as well since products otherwise fail to sell when cheaper alternatives become available, but no individual is in control of these price fluctuations, or in control of how all the price changes will impact on each other. All they can really do to influence the market is to raise or lower their own prices, but even so they can do that only within certain limits. Ordinarily, people have to accept and work with many given cost-price levels and given sale-price levels which they cannot do anything about. If a product cannot be produced at a certain cost, or if it cannot be sold at a certain price-level, it is unlikely that it will be available much at all.

In this way, Marx argues, production activities actually become dominated by the values of the products being produced and exchanged (so-called "market forces"), often quite irrespective of what human needs might be, because these product-values will determine whether and how it is "economic" or "uneconomic" to produce and trade particular products.

=== Field of application ===
According to Marx, "economic value" is a purely social category. It is only and exclusively a characteristic of things which are really produced and reproduced by human labour. Thus, things have an "economic value" simply and only because it takes human labour-time to make them. This value exists and persists quite independently of fluctuating prices in markets. Although they are connected, the value relationships between labour-products and price relationships can vary independently of each other, within certain limits. A price can be attached to almost any object, but this does not automatically mean that the object also has a value in Marx's sense of being the product of labour. (Note: "Things which in and for themselves are not commodities, things such as conscience, honour, etc., can be offered for sale by their holders, and thus acquire the form of commodities through their price. Hence a thing can, formally speaking, have a price without having a value." – Karl Marx)

The field of application of the law of value is limited to new output by producers of traded, reproducible labour-products, although it might indirectly influence trade in other goods or assets (for example, the value of a second-hand good may be related to a newly produced good of the same type). Thus, the law does not apply to all goods, services or assets in an economy, and it does not rule the whole economy. In modern Marxism, the law of value is often equated with "market economy", but that was not Marx's own idea. Rather, it limits, regulates and constrains the trade in products. Simply put, the socially necessary labour requirements set limits for the movements of product prices. Primary products are a special case, which Marx discusses in his theory of differential and absolute ground rent. World market prices for primary products can at any time be strongly influenced by the yield of harvests and mines in different countries, regardless of labour effort. There are, besides, various kinds of products which, for one reason or another, are not subject to the law of value (see below).

== Origins of the concept ==
According to Marx, the knowledge that the law of value existed, expressed in one form or another, sometimes more clearly and sometimes less, was very ancient—it reached right back to the first nomadic traders in food, crafts, services and minerals. People knew very well that there was a definite relationship between time worked and the value of products traded; in itself that was not a very difficult insight to grasp. (Note: "When you are poor, you are willing to trade your time to earn money. When you are rich, you trade your money to get more time." Scott Adams) In fact, three hundred years before the Scottish and English political economists, Ibn Khaldun had already formally presented a fairly sophisticated understanding of the law of value. The economic effects of the availability or lack of labour—already reckoned with some precision in ancient Sumer more than four thousand years ago—were rather self-evident in practical life. Nevertheless, different thinkers in history failed to conceptualize the law of value with any adequacy.

The basic idea of the law of value was expressed by Adam Smith in The Wealth of Nations. Neoclassical economist Paul A. Samuelson (1971) famously argued that "the beaver-deer exchange ratio can range anywhere from 4/3 to 2/1 depending upon whether tastes are strong for deer or for beaver" and, therefore, it seems that trading ratios are regulated only by the volume and intensity of consumer demand, as expressed by consumer preferences, rather than by labour-time. According to the classical economists, however, such shifts in trading ratios would quickly cause a switch from beaver-hunting to deer-hunting or vice versa; short-term fluctuations in demand could not usually change the labour-costs of hunting as such, except if new technologies suddenly made it possible to capture more game in less labour-time, or if the herds of animals had become seriously depleted.

The concept of the law of value was also stated by David Ricardo at the very beginning of his Principles of Political Economy and Taxation, as follows:

The value of a commodity, or the quantity of any other commodity for which it will exchange, depends on the relative quantity of labour which is necessary for its production, and not on the greater or less compensation which is paid for that labour.

At the most basic level, this Ricardian law of value specified "labor-content" as the substance and measure of economic value, and it suggests that trade will—other things being equal—evolve towards the exchange of equivalents (insofar as all trading partners try to "get their money's worth"). At the basis of the trading process is the economising of human time, and normal trading ratios become known to, or accepted, by economic actors. This leads naturally to the idea that the law of value will "balance out" the trading process. (Note: See further Geoffrey Pilling, "The law of value in Ricardo and Marx", Economy & Society, Vol 1, issue 3, 1972, pp. 281–307. Marx, Capital, Volume I, Penguin, p. 168.) The corollary is that market trade is regarded as intrinsically self-regulating through the mutual adjustments of supply and demand: market trade spontaneously tends towards an equilibrium state.

Marx's real concern was to understand and analyze how the law of value determines or regulates exchange, i.e. how the balancing of the production of outputs and the demand for them could be accomplished, in a society based on a universal market such as capitalism, and how this was regulated by labour-time. Marx's theory specifically aims to grasp capital in motion, i.e. how, through the circulation and competitive dynamics of capital, changing expenditures of social labor are reconciled with (or fail to be reconciled with) changing social needs. In the third volume of Das Kapital, he aims to show how the competition for profits from production is constrained by the law of value and how this shapes the developmental pattern of capitalist production. He concludes that the law of value cannot directly regulate commodity prices in capitalist production, but only indirectly (prices of production are constrained by comparative costs in labour time).

Marx praised Adam Smith for already recognizing that in the transition "from simple commodity exchange and its law of value to... exchange between capital and wage-labour... something new occurs, [so that] apparently (and actually, in the result) the law of value changes into its opposite." However, Marx noted both Adam Smith and David Ricardo were unable to explain consistently how product-values were regulated by labour-time within capitalist production. Both Smith and Ricardo deeply believed that price structures for products were determined by the law of value; but, Marx argued, neither of them could explain how that value-price relationship operated, without contradicting themselves. They could not theoretically reconcile the regulation of commodity trade by law of value, with profit-receipts in proportion to capital employed (rather than in proportion to labour-time worked). Smith and Ricardo mooted the concept of "natural prices" instead, to postulate a "natural" (intrinsic) self-balancing tendency of markets—at the point where demand and supply were balanced, the "natural" price (the "true" value) had been reached. The effect was that their "labour theory of value" was disconnected from their theory of capital distributions. In Marx's theory, a true supply/demand balance in the capitalist economy—which, if it existed at all, would occur only incidentally—would mean that goods sold at their normal production price, but this did not automatically or necessarily mean that they sold at their value. The production prices could be persistently above or below product-values.

== Economic value ==
Economic value exists necessarily, according to Marx, because human beings as social beings and moral subjects must co-operatively produce and economize their means of life to survive. Humans have to value things, and each other, in order to survive. In so doing they are subject to relations of production. They know that their products have a socially accepted value, even if no trade occurs yet. Three main kinds of relationships are involved which are objectively and empirically verifiable, and often formalised in law:

- Between people (social relations).
- Between people and their economic products (technical relations).
- Between economic products themselves (with or without trading prices; these are technical, economic or commercial relations, or, in general, value proportions).

The attribution of value to labor-products, and therefore the economising of their use, occurs within these three types of relationships interacting with each other. The value of one product then depends on the value of many other products, and, in a community of independent private producers, their economic relations are then necessarily expressed through the product-values of what they trade. This expression involves character masks. Over time, most products acquire a normal exchange-value, meaning that what a product costs relative to other products remains fairly stable. However, because these three types of relationships co-exist and interact objectively independent of individuals, it may appear that economic value is an intrinsic property of products, or alternately, that it is simply a characteristic that results from negotiations between market actors with different subjective preferences. Marx recognised that value has both objective and subjective aspects, but he was primarily concerned with the objectification of value through market trade, where objectified (reified) value relations rule human affairs (see value-form). Paradoxically, he argues, this phenomenon meant that human lives became "ruled and dominated" by the products which people themselves had produced, and more specifically by the trading values of those products.

When more and more of human requirements are marketised, and a complex division of labor develops, the link between value and labor-time becomes obscured or opaque, and economic value seems to exist only as an impersonal "market force" (a given structure of priced costs and sale-values) to which all people must adjust their behaviour. Human labor becomes dominated by the economic exchange of the products of that labor, and labor itself becomes a tradeable abstract value (see Abstract labour and concrete labour).

The result of the difficulties in explaining economic value and its sources is that value becomes something of a mystery, and that how the attribution of value really occurs is no longer clear. (Note: "The value-form, whose fully developed shape is the money-form, is very simple and slight in content. Nevertheless, the human mind has sought in vain for more than 2,000 years to get to the bottom of it, while on the other hand there has been at least an approximation to a successful analysis of forms which are much richer in content and more complex." – Karl Marx) The three relationships mentioned become mixed up, and are confused with each other, in commercial and economic discourse, and it appears that things and assets acquire an independent power to create value, even although value is a human attribution. Marx refers to this as commodity fetishism or thingification (Verdinglichung or reification) which culminates in what he calls fictitious capital. Value then seems to appear spontaneously out of trading activity. He regards this perception as an inevitable effect of commercial practice, since it involves the circumstance that objects acquire a value which exists independently of the valuer, a value "set by the state of the market" which individuals normally cannot change and must adjust to. The end result is that value theory is banished from economics as a useless metaphysics, surviving only in the form of assumptions made about price behaviour. Because money-prices offer convenient quantifiable and generally applicable units of economic value, no further inquiry into value is deemed necessary. (Note: Ian Steedman thus argued value theory was unnecessary, since everything can be stated in terms of prices. See: Ian Steedman, Marx after Sraffa. London: NLB, 1977.)

To solve the riddle of economic value, Marx argues, we must investigate the real historical origins of the conditions which give rise to the riddle in the first place, i.e. the real economic history of trade and the way that history has been reflected in human thought. Once we do this, value is no longer defined simply an attribute of products and assets, but as a relation between objects and subjects. (Note: See Karl Marx, Theories of Surplus Value (3 Vols.) and the Grundrisse manuscript.)

== Is it an equilibrium theory? ==
Thomas T. Sekine has interpreted Marx's law of value as a purely theoretical principle of market equilibrium which has no application to empirical reality. This raises the question of how we verify that it is a "law" at all. Paul Mattick argued that Marx offered no theory of market equilibrium, only a dynamic theory of enlarged economic reproduction. In reality, markets were rarely in equilibrium anyway (that was more a hypothesis used by economists, or a euphemism for "price stability"), and what explained the market behaviour of individuals and groups was precisely the imbalances between supply and demand propelling them into action. On this interpretation, capitalist development is always imbalanced development which, typically, the state tries to mitigate or compensate for.

Under capitalist conditions, balancing output and market demand depended on capital accumulation occurring. If profits were not made, production would stop sooner or later. A capitalist economy was therefore in "equilibrium" so long as it could reproduce its social relations of production, permitting profit-making and capital accumulation to occur, but this was compatible with all sorts of market fluctuations and disequilibria. So long as workers were "back to work" each working day, maintaining the value of assets and creating new value, it was "business as usual". Only when shortages or oversupply began to threaten the existence of the relations of production themselves, and block the accumulation of capital in critical areas (for example, an economic depression, a political revolt against capitalist property or against mass unemployment), a genuine "disequilibrium" occurred; all the rest was just ordinary market fluctuations.

Real social needs and their monetary expression through market demand might be two very different things. A demand might exist without any buying power, and it might be that more could technically be supplied, but isn't (see Capacity utilization). Economic equilibrium was not created by any perfect match of supply and demand, but by the social framework which permitted the balancing act to occur. The role of the political state was essential in this, to provide an enforced legal framework for fair trade, currency stability and secure property rights

Marx himself regarded the idea that society was somehow balanced out by market trade as a typical figment of "bourgeois ideology" and he was a strong critic of Jean-Baptiste Say. In the real world, there was only a more or less haphazard adjustment of supply and demand through incessant price fluctuations. In reality, a lot of non-market activity was necessary to keep market activity going, (Note: "The maintenance and reproduction of the working-class is, and must ever be, a necessary condition to the reproduction of capital. But the capitalist may safely leave its fulfilment to the labourer's instincts of self-preservation and of propagation. All the capitalist cares for, is to reduce the labourer's individual consumption as far as possible to what is strictly necessary, and he is far away from imitating those brutal South Americans, who force their labourers to take the more substantial, rather than the less substantial, kind of food." – Karl Marx) and the role of the state was indispensable (for the security of private property, currency stability and the enforcement of trading obligations).

== Factors counteracting the law of value ==
The law of value can interact with other phenomena which modify its effects. The 15 main factors counteracting the operation of the law of value, as a law governing the economic exchange of products, are the following:

- The non-existence of regular trade or an established, stable market for products, so that a dominant social valuation and generally accepted trading norms do not rule the terms of trade for products; in this case, there is no consensus on what products are worth, or it is unknown, and products will trade on all kinds of different terms which could vary greatly.
- Structural unequal exchange – alternative or competing sources of supply or demand are absent or blocked, distorting trading ratios in favour of those in a stronger market (or bargaining) position. In that case, the true value or cost of products may deviate greatly from actual selling prices for a prolonged time.
- Other restrictions on trade and what people may do with resources (legal, technical, protectionism etc.).
- Taxation and subsidies to producers by government (subsidies less indirect taxes paid can be a significant addition to the value of gross product).
- Disparities in currency exchange rates.
- Monopoly pricing where firms drive up prices because they control the supply of most of the market demand (perhaps because they own brands or patents), or temporarily lower prices to increase market share.
- Large-scale speculation driving up prices.
- Administered prices set by a state authority or a monopolist.
- The large-scale use of credit economy to acquire goods and services produced elsewhere, without corresponding increases in local production occurring.
- Non-market allocation of resources, including gifts and grants.
- Countertrade (forms of barter).
- Accumulation of fictitious capital (bubble economies).
- Dumping of surplus goods at dumping prices. (Note: See for example the Australian Brumby Anti-Dumping Review of 27 November 2012. http://antidumpingreview.gov.au/)
- Wars and disasters which create abnormal scarcities and demands for goods and services.
- Illegal (criminal) or "grey" transactions (including pirated and counterfeited goods).

All of these phenomena occur to some degree or other in any real economy. Hence the effect of the law of value would usually be mediated by them, and would manifest itself only as a tendency, or as a law of "grand averages".

Nevertheless, price-value divergences are typically quantitatively limited. Although the real cost structure of production can be distorted by all kinds of extraneous factors, the law of value places limits on the amount of the distortion. Even if goods sell at an abnormally low or high prices, that abnormality relates to a "normal" referent price, and it is precisely that price which, according to Marx, is constrained by the law of value, i.e. by the proportionalities of human labour-time reflected in the cost structure of products.

== In capitalism ==
Marx argues that, as economic exchange develops and markets expand while traditional methods of production are destroyed and replaced by commercial practices, the law of value is modified in its operation.

=== Production prices ===
Thus, the capitalist mode of production is a type of economy, in which both inputs and outputs of production have become marketed goods and services (or commodities) which are bought and sold freely. Here, capitalists do not make money simply from trading or renting, but from the capitalization of production itself. Products and labour are purchased to manufacture new products which have a higher value in the market than their cost price, resulting in a profit from the added value. In such an economy, Marx argues, what directly regulates the economic exchange of new labour-products is not the law of value, but their prices of production. The theoretical problem which Marx then tries to tackle is how the movements of production prices across time are nevertheless regulated by the law of value. That was the problem which classical political economy failed to solve.

The production price is the price at which output would have to sell, in order to realize the average, normal rate of profit on the capital invested in producing that output. That is largely a matter of cost-prices, profit margins and sales turnover. If we find that the distribution of sale-prices for a given type of commodity converges on a particular normal price-level, then, Marx argues, the real reason is, that only at that price-level the commodity can be supplied at an acceptable or normal profit.

In pre-capitalist societies, where many inputs and outputs often weren't priced goods, but allocated "by right" or according to custom, the concept of an average production price would be rather meaningless. Large price differences existed even between towns, provinces and regions, yielding welcome profit to merchant traders. In capitalist society, differences in capital yields are constantly being leveled out by competition on a larger and larger scale, creating industry norms for normal returns on investments. The corollary in capitalist production is the increasingly free movement (or, at least, mobility) of labour and capital among branches of industry, in other words that capital and labour can be traded and shifted around fairly freely, with the aid of better transport and communication systems.

In Capital, Volume I, Marx largely ignored price fluctuations for the given inputs and outputs of production. He assumed that the prices of commodities were equal to their values. There were, however, three main reasons for this simplification:

- Whether or not commodities used or produced traded for a bit more, or a bit less, than their socially average value, made no substantial difference to the capitalist relationships of the production process which he sought to analyze.
- Marx aimed to show, that even if all commodities traded exactly at their value (equal exchange), and regardless of short-term price fluctuations, capitalists could still make money from production, since, in the normal business situation, workers always created more value for their employers than was represented by the total wage bill. If that wasn't the case, capitalists would be defeated by market fluctuations very quickly. Economic exploitation was, therefore, not simply a matter of unfairly short-changing people in market trade, but rooted in the permanently unequal position of employers and employees in production.
- Although it appears like trading relationships determine the relationships of production, Marx argues that in aggregate (in an overall sense) it is just the other way round: the relationships of the direct production process (the mode of production) determine the relationships of exchange. This justifies the initial analysis of production in abstraction from all kinds of price fluctuations.

=== Economic significance of price-value divergences ===
The fact that products can be traded above or below their value (and hence that more labour can exchange for less labour) became a fundamental theoretical problem for classical political economy. That is, the classical political economists failed theoretically to reconcile the law of value with unequal exchange (the exchange of unequal values). For Marx, the exchange of non-equivalents was not an aberration in the exchange process at all, but instead the pivot of business competition among producers in capitalist society. Price-value differences for labour-products determined how much of the new surplus value produced by enterprises, potentially contained in an output of commodities, could be realized as profit by those enterprises.

Capitalist economic exchange, Marx argues (contrary to David Ricardo's theory), is not a simple exchange of equivalent values. It aims not to trade goods and services of equivalent value, but instead to make money from the trade (this is called capital accumulation). The aim is to buy as cheaply as possible, and sell as dear as possible, under the competitive constraint that everybody has the same objective. The effect is that the whole cost-structure of production permanently includes profit as an additional impost. In an overall sense, Marx argues the substance of this impost is the unpaid surplus labour performed by the working class; part of society can live off the labour of others due to their ownership of property.

In this situation, output values produced by enterprises will typically deviate from output prices realised. Market competition for a given demand will impose a ruling price-level for a type of output, but the different competing enterprises producing it will take more or less labour to produce it, depending on productivity levels and technologies they use. Consequently, output values produced by different enterprises (in terms of labour-time) and output prices realised by them will typically diverge (within certain limits): enterprises can get more or less income for the value of what they produce. That divergence becomes a critical factor in capitalist competition and the dynamics of the production system, under conditions where the average price-levels for products are beyond anyone's control.

=== Competition between producers ===
If capital accumulation becomes the dominant motive for production, then producers will do everything they can to cut costs, increase sales and increase profits. Since they mostly lack control over the ruling market prices for their inputs and outputs, they try to increase productivity by every means at their disposal and maximise surplus labour. Because the lower the unit-costs of goods produced by an enterprise, the greater the margin will be between its own cost-prices and the ruling sale prices for those goods in the market, and therefore the larger the profits that can be realised as result when goods are sold. Producers thus become very concerned with the value added in what they produce, which depends crucially on productivity.

In the classical competitive situation, capitalists basically aim to employ workers to:

- produce and sell a greater volume of products more quickly,
- at a competitive market-price which is below the socially established normal valuation for that kind of product which applies in market-trade,
- principally by means of a better labour-exploitation rate and higher productivity than their competitors,
- which lowers the cost-price per unit of product in the total turnover,
- yet provides a superior profit rate on capital invested, even if the selling price is below the normal valuation.

Such price-cutting competition is limited in scope however, because if competitors adopt the same production methods, the productivity advantage will disappear. In addition, beyond a certain point workers will begin to resist their exploitation, and they may join trade unions. And, if market prices for products were reduced to their most competitive cost-prices only, profits would fall to zero. This leads to constant attempts worldwide to improve production techniques to cut costs, improve productivity and hold down labour-costs, but ultimately also to a decline in the labor-content of commodities. Therefore, their values will also decline over time; more and more commodities are produced, for a larger and larger market, at an increasingly cheaper cost. Marx claims that this trend happens "with the necessity of a natural law"; producers had no choice about doing what they could in the battle for productivity, if they wanted to maintain or increase sales and profits. That was, in Marx's view, the "revolutionary" aspect of capitalism. (Note: In the Communist Manifesto, Marx and Engels state somewhat rhetorically: "The bourgeoisie, during its rule of scarce one hundred years, has created more massive and more colossal productive forces than have all preceding generations together. Subjection of Nature's forces to man, machinery, application of chemistry to industry and agriculture, steam-navigation, railways, electric telegraphs, clearing of whole continents for cultivation, canalisation of rivers, whole populations conjured out of the ground -- what earlier century had even a presentiment that such productive forces slumbered in the lap of social labor?")

Competition among producers inexorably gives rise to market monopolies for products, which may constrain further significant advances in productivity and innovation. According to Marx, monopolies and competition always co-exist; monopolies in the production of goods and services are rarely permanent, and as soon as competition is blocked at one level, it reappears at another level. (Note: "In practical life we find not only competition, monopoly and the antagonism between them, but also the synthesis of the two, which is not a formula, but a movement. Monopoly produces competition, competition produces monopoly. Monopolists are made from competition; competitors become monopolists." – Karl Marx) However, Marx never discussed all the different forms of economic competition in capitalist society. His main concern was to explain what the competition was ultimately about, and what structural factors were involved, from the point of view of the production system as a whole.

The negative influence of the tendency of the rate of profit to fall on business income could, Marx argued, be overcome in the long run only by organizing production and sales on a larger and larger scale, or by technological revolutions which reduced the cost of raw materials, labour and fixed equipment. That was capitalist progress. But to be able to compete in product markets in the end requires enormous amounts of investment capital, which (1) cuts out most would-be producers and (2) lowers the profit rate on investment capital. In turn, investors will no longer commit very large amounts of capital to investment projects if they are uncertain about whether those projects will yield an adequate return in the future. The more uncertainty there is, the more difficult it is to "securitize" (insure) their longer-term investments against losses of capital. If the state will not provide financial backing, private finance must provide it, but the latter is reluctant to do so if the risks outweigh the yields. This causes a powerful development of capital markets and supporting financial services, including shadow banking (credit facilities by non-bank organizations). (Note: See: Financial Stability Board, Global Shadow Banking Monitoring Report 2012."Archived copy" (PDF). Archived from the original (PDF) on 2012-12-02.)

In a developed capitalism, the development or decline of the different branches of production occurs through the continual entry and exit of capital, basically guided by profitability criteria, and within the framework of competition. Where demand and profits are high, capital moves in, and when demand and profits are low, capital moves elsewhere. Thus, supply and demand are reconciled, however imperfectly, by the incessant migrations of capital across the economy. Yet, Marx argues, this whole process is nevertheless still regulated by the law of value; ultimately, relative price movements for products are still determined by comparative expenditures of labour-time. Thus, market prices for outputs will gravitate towards prices of production which themselves are constrained by product-values expressible in quantities of labour-time. (Note: "We have seen that the price of production of a commodity is not at all identical with its value, although the prices of production of commodities, considered in their totality, are regulated only by their total value, and although the movement of production prices of various kinds of commodities, all other circumstances being equal, is determined exclusively by the movement of their values.” – Karl Marx)

=== Law of value and crises ===
In serious economic crises, Marx suggests, the structure of market prices is more or less suddenly readjusted to the evolving underlying structure of production values. The economic crisis means that price and value relationships have gotten badly out of kilter, causing a breakdown of the normal trading process. According to Marx, the basic meaning of crises for capitalists was, that they could not longer invest their capital at an adequate profit income, which usually meant also that their capital lost part of its value. For workers, crises meant an increase in unemployment, and wage-cuts. Some output and assets might also be destroyed, because they could not be sold, or because they did not make money. Solving the crisis meant reorganizing production and trade, to meet the new requirements for profitable sales. Usually, crises were happening all the time somewhere in the capitalist economy, but those crises were limited to specific industries going bust – such crises normally did not spread to the whole economy. However, at some point, the crisis of particular branches of activity could set off a chain-reaction which would spread to the whole economy.

Marx himself never developed a substantive theory of capitalist crises, beyond commenting about the economic crises he was able to observe himself. (Note: Marx refers to crises in Das Kapital, Theories of Surplus Value and the Grundrisse; in a number of newspaper articles for the Neue Rheinische Zeitung and New York Daily Tribune (MECW Vols. 9, 11, 12, 14, 15); and in his correspondence with Friedrich Engels.) His main claim was that the crises are system-immanent (due to endogenous causes), and not an accidental aberration, i.e. they are a necessary feature of capitalist development. A large Marxist literature on "crisis theory" nowadays exists, in which different authors defend various ideas about the "ultimate" causes of capitalist crises (see also crisis theory) – basing themselves on a few scattered comments by Marx on the topic. Such theories are very difficult to prove scientifically, for five reasons:

- The theories are very abstract, making it difficult to test them convincingly.
- Even if reliable data is available, the data can be read in different ways.
- There exist a very large number of different factors which can influence business profitability, investments and market sales, while it is difficult to prove how these factors are all related, or to prove which ones are the most important ones in an overall sense (since different kinds of business operate in different circumstances).
- The final causes of crises might not be exactly the same in every crisis occurring in the last two centuries, except if particular causes are accepted as the main ones "by definition".
- Marx's ideas about crises were based on the kind of capitalism that existed in the mid-19th century, without it being very clear what the continuities and discontinuities are with present-day capitalism.

According to a popular Marxist interpretation, crises are the necessary result of the falling profitability of production capital, which, according to Marx, was an effect of rising overall productivity (raising the organic composition of production capital and lowering the value of commodities). But supposing that we can prove definitely that profitability did gradually decline across (say) 25 years, it is still not proved why a serious economic crisis would occur precisely at the end of that period, rather than (say) after 5 years, or 10 years, or 15 years. That is, by demonstrating an empirical profitability trend, the main causes and effects of the trend are not yet proved. In addition, production capital is a smaller and smaller fraction of the total mass of capital accumulated, and thus, it is not proved how the reduced profitability of only a minor part of the total capital can, by itself, throw the whole of capitalist society into crisis.

What can be definitely proved, is that slumps have happened fairly regularly in the history of industrial capitalism from the 1820s onward, some being more severe than others. In the real economic history of capitalism, there is therefore no evidence of a spontaneous tendency toward economic equilibrium: capitalism develops spasmodically, through booms and slumps. Every crisis is supposed to be the last one, until a new crisis occurs. That was, for Marx, a good reason for doing away with the capitalist system, and bringing production under planned, collective control by the freely associated producers.

== Modification in the world market ==
Marx believed that the operation of the law of value was not only modified by the capitalist mode of production, but also in the world market (world trade, as contrasted with the home market or national economy).

The main reason for this was the existence of different levels of the intensity and productivity of labour in different countries, creating for example a very different cost structure in different countries for all kinds of products. (Note: The Marxist Ernest Mandel argued that even before differentials in productivity between nations became apparent through foreign trade, there already existed regional disparities within countries; these disparities tended to fade with more market integration. See: Ernest Mandel, Capitalism and Regional Disparities. Toronto: Hogtown Press pamphlet, 1971, reprinted under the same title in: Southwest Economy and Society, Vol. 1, 1976.) Products that took 1 hour of labour to make in country A might take 10 hours to make in country B, a difference in production costs which could strongly influence the exchange values realised in the trade between A and B. More labour could, in effect, exchange for less labour internationally (an "unequal exchange" in value terms) for a prolonged time. In addition, the normal rate of surplus value could be different in different countries. That makes a huge difference not only to profitability, but to the ability to sell products at competitive prices.

So traders would try to use this differential to their advantage, with the usual motto "buy cheap, sell dear". This promotes the internationalization of business. The result, some Marxists argue, is an international transfer of value, from countries with a weaker bargaining position to those with a stronger one. (Note: See Anwar Shaikh, "Values and Value transfers: A Comment on Itoh." and Enrique Dussel & Anibal Yanez, "Marx's economic manuscripts of 1861–63 and the 'concept' of dependency". Latin American Perspectives, Vol. 17 No. 2, Spring 1990, pp. 62–101, as well as the literature cited in the article on unequal exchange.) The differential in labour valuations becomes a source of profit (see also global labor arbitrage).

Among German Marxists, Marx's fragmentary remarks on the law of value in a world market setting stimulated an important theoretical debate in the 1970s and early 1980s. One aim of this debate was to move beyond crude Ricardian interpretations of comparative advantage or comparative costs in explaining the pattern of world trade. To some extent similar debates took place in the US, France and Japan. In particular, when the volume of intra-industry trade (IIT) between countries grows (i.e. the same kinds of products are both imported and exported by a country), and when different branches of the same multinational import and export between countries with their own internal price regime, international comparative advantage theories of the Ricardian type do not apply.

Nowadays, Marxian scholars argue, comparative advantage survives mainly as an ideology justifying the benefits of international trade, not as an accurate description of that trade (some economists however draw subtle distinctions between comparative "advantages" and comparative "costs", while others switch to the concept of competitive advantage). Ultimately, the "comparative advantage" ideology is based on a very simple ideology about trade. This ideology says, that if everybody specializes in what they are the best at producing, this provides the greatest amount of wealth for everybody, because then everybody will be operating in the most efficient way. But this ideology is hopelessly naive. The simple reason is that, even if products are produced very efficiently, this says nothing about the terms on which products will be traded, and the incomes which producers will get for their work. They might work very efficiently, but get very little money for their effort.

The operation of the law of value in the world market might however seem rather abstract, in view of the phenomena of unequal exchange, differences in accounting norms, protectionism, debt-driven capital accumulation and gigantic differences in currency exchange rates between rich and poor countries. These phenomena can create very a significant distortion in world trade between final market prices for goods, and the real production costs for those goods, resulting in superprofit for the beneficiaries of the trade. The value and physical volume of manufactured exports by developing countries increased gigantically more than the actual income obtained by the producers. Third world nations relatively speaking received less and less for what they produced for sale in the world market, even as they produced more and more; this is also reflected in the international terms of trade for manufactured products.

The postulate of the law of value does however lead to the Marxian historical prediction that global prices of production will be formed by world competition among producers in the long term. That is, the conditions for producing and selling products in different countries will be equalised in the long run through global market integration; this will be reflected also in International Financial Reporting Standards. Thus globalisation means that incipiently the "leveling out of differences in industrial rates of profit" through competition begins to operate internationally. Trading ratios and exchange-values for products sold globally would thus become more and more similar, in the long term.

== In Soviet-type societies ==
There has been a long debate among Marxists about whether the law of value also operates in command economies where production is directed mainly by the state authorities. This debate occurred separately from the socialist calculation debate. There is still little agreement on the issue, because different Marxists use different definitions and concepts which are often influenced by political attitudes.

=== Joseph Stalin ===
In his 1952 work Economic Problems of Socialism in the USSR, Soviet leader Joseph Stalin argued that the law of value did operate in the economy of the Soviet Union. Stalin was primarily concerned at the time with the problem of wasted labour, in an economy where workers often could not be easily fired (they had a constitutionally guaranteed right to a job, and there was considerable featherbedding of employees), and where there was often no clear relationship between salary-levels, work performance and actual output. Stalin's theory of the law of value was critically discussed by Włodzimierz Brus in The market in a socialist economy and by Mao Zedong in A Critique of Soviet Economics.

=== Yevgeni Preobrazhensky ===
Apart from Stalin, the most influential theorist of the law of value in the 20th century was Yevgeni Preobrazhensky. In his book The New Economics (1926, published in English in 1965), Preobrazhensky tried to specify clearly what the law of value should be understood to mean, for the purpose of economic policy. His main thesis was as such:

Both the law of value and the planning principle, the basic tendencies of which assume in the Soviet economy the form of the law of primitive socialist accumulation, are operating within a single economic organism, and are counterposed one to the other as a result of the victory of the October revolution.

This influential analysis equated the law of value with market economy, and counterposed it to state-organized economy. There was, in other words, a structural conflict between the market principle and the collective planning principle. Preobrazhensky then aimed to show how state-organized economy could prevail over market forces in such a way, that the economic growth path would be optimal. His basic idea was that a tax on the millions of farmers in the Russian empire could finance urban industrialization. Preobrazhensky's approach to the law of value became the common assumption of left-wing Marxists discussing the transition to socialism, (Note: see, e.g., Ernest Mandel, Marxist Economic Theory, Vol. 2. London: Merlin Press, 1968, chapters 15, 16 and 17; Catherine Samary, Plan, Market and Democracy, IIRE Notebook for study and research 7/8, 1988 ; Paul Sweezy, “Toward a Program of Studies of the Transition to Socialism,” Monthly Review Vol. 23, no. 9 (February 1972): 1–13.) until the theorists of market socialism began to challenge it and gained more intellectual influence. According to Fred L. Block, nowadays "Contemporary scholarship rejects the assumption...that state and market are distinct and opposing modes of organizing economic activity."

=== State capitalism theorists ===
Supporters of the theory of state capitalism in the Soviet Union (such as Tony Cliff and Chris Harman) and scholars such as Andre Gunder Frank have also believed that the law of value operated in Soviet-type societies. However, it is not always clear what they mean by the law of value, beyond the vague idea that the direct producers remain dominated by their own products, or that labour costs remain important, or that Soviet-type societies remained influenced by the world market. In 1979, Tony Cliff explained:

When I came to the theory of state capitalism [in 1947], I didn't come to it by a long analysis of the law of value in Russia, the economic statistics in Russia. Nothing of the sort. I came to it by the simple statement that if the emancipation of the working class is the act of the working class, then you cannot have a workers' state without the workers having power to dictate what happens to society.

Many Western Marxists reasoned that if workers were oppressed in the Soviet economy, the Soviet system could not be socialist, and that if it was not socialist, it must be capitalist – be it a special kind of capitalism, a capitalism mainly directed by the state. A similar theory was adopted in 1967 by the Chinese communists: after Stalin died in 1953, according to this theory, a sort of coup d'état had occurred in the Kremlin, which led to the "restoration of capitalism" throughout the USSR. The 1965 Soviet economic reform was interpreted as a proof of that theory. Some Western Maoists followed this interpretation. A 1977 resolution of the Bay Area Communist Union, an American Maoist group, stated that: "In socialist society, commodity exchange, as well as value and the law of value continue to a certain extent. Only communism obliterates all aspects of commodity exchange, value, money, etc. However, one commodity does disappear under socialism: labor-power."

From the 1930s to the 1950s, when Soviet industrialization seemed to be forging ahead, many Western Marxists theorized that Soviet state capitalism was a "higher stage" of capitalism than ordinary capitalism. But when it became very clear, in the 1980s, that Soviet economic growth was lagging behind the West, the Soviet state-capitalist stage was often reconceptualized as a lower stage of capitalism, which would in due course lead to "ordinary" capitalism (in Cliff's theory, all capitalisms in all countries are "state capitalisms" of one sort or another – some more developed, and others less developed).

In his famous book State capitalism in Russia (1948), Tony Cliff theorized that the law of value "tends to equalise supply and demand, a situation in which price is equal to value, or more correctly, is equal to price of production." Although there seemed to him to be little internal evidence that the law of value regulated the Soviet economy, he believed the law of value was "the arbiter of the Russian economic structure as soon as it is seen in the concrete historical situation of today—the anarchic world market." Critics of this interpretation argue that the Soviet economy was, in reality, rather autarkic (self-sufficient), that foreign trade was state-directed and played a comparatively small role in the economy as a whole, and that the foreign transactions were often non-commercial (often a form of barter, subsidized transfers or counter-trade).

Rudolf Hilferding regarded state capitalist theories as conceptually incoherent, because – he argued – the law of value presupposed market competition among private enterprises. If the allocation of resources was performed by a state dictatorship, there was no capitalism at all.

=== Ernest Mandel ===
According to Ernest Mandel, the law of value, as a law of exchange, did influence non-capitalist societies to some extent, inasmuch as exchange and trade persisted, but because the state directed the bulk of economic resources, the law of value no longer ruled or dominated resource allocation. The best proof of that was that there was mostly no clear relationship at all anymore between the exchange-value of goods traded, how they were allocated, and what it really cost to produce them; accounting information, insofar as it was valid, might in fact be unable to show anything about the real nature of resource allocation. The prices in the Soviet economy were, for the most part, not market prices but administered prices set by the planning boards (there was also a black market, mainly for consumer goods). Insofar as the social priorities of state policy ensured that people got what they needed, that was a good thing; but insofar as resources were wasted because of a lack of sensible cost-economies, it was a bad thing. Cost-accounting is, of course, no more "neutral" than profit-accounting; a lot depends on what costs are included and excluded in the calculation.

Mandel blamed the waste of resources in the Soviet economy on bureaucracy, and regarded the USSR as a bureaucratically degenerated workers' state. He believed that if there was genuine democracy instead of bureaucracy, there would be no more waste. Mandel's critics believe this is a naive theory because:

- It presents democracy as a solution, without considering property forms and institutional arrangements in any detail.
- In the real world, there exists – as Mandel sometimes admitted – no "quick-fix" or panacea for the problems of bureaucracy.
- According to Mandel, "the bureaucracy" is a purely parasitic social caste, which has usurped the power to rule over society; it has no productive function at all, it is only "ballast" for society. Thus, if the bureaucracy is wiped out through a political revolution, the bureaucrats would not be missed and society would be better off. This interpretation is difficult to sustain in reality, since the bureaucrats performed essential managerial, organizing, development, service and coordination functions.
- Democratic decisions are not necessarily any better-made or more efficient, than bureaucratic or entrepreneurial ones; at most, democracy allows for errors to be corrected more easily, and permits bad managers to be ousted more easily, instead of bad managers becoming entrenched in positions of power.
- The real issue is not democracy as such, but the specifics of democratic procedures, mechanisms and organizational forms.
- Mandel misunderstands the core idea of communism, which is to change the way human beings relate and are related, so that they can all have good lives in a cooperative commonwealth.
- Economists have made many arguments along the lines that inefficiency in the Soviet economy resulted precisely from the lack of any clear relationship between pricing and economic value (in the sense of true economic cost).

Charles Bettelheim complained that Mandel lacked a "dialectical synthesis", because, in a somewhat Cartesian way, Mandel tried "to deal with the complex reality of the transitional society by means of the simplest and most abstract categories of "pure" and fully developed socialist society." Other critics think the problem is rather different: it is that almost all Marxists have created a theoretical dichotomy between "market economy" and "planned economy", suggesting that either there is market anarchy, or else a planned, non-market economy. In the real world, such a dichotomy rarely exists—almost all economists agree that planning and markets are compatible; in fact they usually depend on each other. According to Peter Frase, "The Market has been so mystified by its apologists that we no longer recognize a planned economy when we see it."

=== Che Guevara ===
In socialist Cuba, Che Guevara adopted the view that if more resources were directly allocated to satisfy human needs, instead of commercially supplied, a better life for people would result. (Note: See, for more information, Helen Yaffe, Che Guevara: The Economics of Revolution. Palgrave Macmillan, 2009.) Guevara organised an interesting conference at which the theoretical issues were debated. At that time, Cuba benefited from plentiful subsidies by Eastern bloc countries, principally the Soviet Union, which compensated for the US trade boycott against Cuba. However, the Cuban Government defaulted on most of its international debt in 1986, reducing its access to foreign credit, and from 1989 the support of the Eastern Bloc disappeared, causing a steep decline in the Cuban national product. The Cuban economy was thereafter sustained to a large extent with foreign tourism, foreign remittances, foreign counter-trade and joint-ventures with foreign companies. In recent years, there have been a number of pro-market reforms, and attempts to reduce state-bureaucratic regulation. The modal standard of living and quality of life in Cuba is still among the best in Central and Latin America. (Note: The United Nations Human Development Index for 2011 ranked Cuba at #51 out of 173 countries (in the top 30% of countries). This ranking was surpassed by Chile at #44, Argentina at #45, and Uruguay at #48.)

=== New Left ===
Generally, the Western New Left adopted the idea that true socialism would involve the abolition of the law of value, since commodity production would be abolished – goods and services would be allocated according to need, and primarily according to non-market principles. This is similar Nikolai Bukharin's and Yevgeni Preobrazhensky's idea in The ABC of Communism:

The communist method of production presupposes ... that production is not for the market, but for use. Under communism, it is no longer the individual manufacturer or the individual peasant who produces; the work of production is effected by the gigantic cooperative as a whole. In consequence of this change, we no longer have commodities, but only products. These products are not exchanged one for another; they are neither bought nor sold. They are simply stored in the communal warehouses, and are subsequently delivered to those who need them. In such conditions, money will no longer be required.

=== John Weeks ===
John Weeks has argued that the law of value is unique to an economy based on the capitalist mode of production. He rejects the claim by Engels that the law of value is associated with the entire history of economic exchange (trade), and modified when the vast majority of inputs and outputs of production have become marketed, priced commodities. Marx himself said that the law of value "develops fully only on the foundation of capitalist production", implying that the law of value already asserted itself before capitalist production, although not fully. Indeed, in a criticism of Adam Smith, Marx specifically refers to the law of value governing "simple commodity exchange"—the point being that this law is transformed in capitalist exchange where "more labour is exchanged for less labour (from the labourer’s standpoint), less labour is exchanged for more labour (from the capitalist’s standpoint)".

Other Marxists (including Ernest Mandel, Michael Perelman and the Japanese scholar Kozo Uno) followed Marx and Engels in believing that the law of value emerges and develops from simple exchange based on simple commodity production. (Note: Marx himself states: "Apart from the way in which the law of value governs prices and their movement, it is also quite apposite to view the values of commodities not only as theoretically prior to the prices of production, but also as historically prior to them. This applies to those conditions in which the means of production belong to the worker, and this condition is to be found, in both the ancient and the modern world., among peasant proprietors and handicraftsmen who work for themselves. This agrees, moreover, with the opinion which we have expressed previously, viz. that the development of products into commodities arises from the exchange between different communities, and not between the members of one and the same community." – Karl Marx In Theories of Surplus Value, chapter 3, section 4, Marx argues that Adam Smith failed to understand how the law of value applying to simple commodity exchange was "turned into its opposite" in capitalist exchange.) If the law of value was unique to capitalism, it becomes impossible to explain the development of pre-capitalist commodity exchange or the evolution of trading processes in a way consistent with historical materialism and Marx's theory of value. So a better approach, it is argued, is to regard the application of the law of value as being modified in the course of the expansion of trade and markets, including more and more of production in the circuit of capital. In that case, a specific society must be investigated to discover the regulating role that the law of value plays in economic exchange.

=== Heinz Dieterich's equivalence economy ===
In contemporary Venezuela, the German socialist economist Heinz Dieterich has argued that the production and distribution of products should occur in accordance with their true labour costs, as shown by special macro-economic labour accounts estimating how much work-time products take to make (in socialism of the 21st century this is called "equivalence economy"). Dieterich stated: "...everybody that can work will only have an income that derives from productive work and it will be directly proportional to the amount of hours you put in. And, I think that is a very extraordinarily helpful definition, which we should use". The idea here is that people "get even" when they get just as much work back, as they put in themselves.

However, this argument is very controversial. Its critics claim equivalence economy is practically impossible, and some indeed point to Marx's rejection in the Grundrisse of the "time-chit" theory of allocating goods proposed by 18th and 19th century utopian socialists such as John Francis Bray and John Gray. (Note: See Marx, Grundrisse, chapter 2 . In Capital, Volume I, Marx states: "I have elsewhere discussed exhaustively the shallow utopianism of the idea of 'labour-money' in a society founded on the production of commodities". (Penguin ed., p. 188). see also: Alfredo Saad-Filho, "Labour, money and 'labour-money: a review of Marx's critique of John Gray's monetary analysis'", History of political economy, Vol. 25, issue 1, 1993, pp. 65–84.) On this view, Dieterich at most shows that the allocation of goods according to commercial principles is only one method of allocating resources; other methods such as sharing, redistribution, subsidization, barter, grants and direct allocation according to need may often serve the interest of fairness, efficiency and social justice better, provided that people accept a common ethic about what is best for all, if they can see that adopting such an ethic has good results. Thus, while integrated labour accounts are certainly useful to have as a planning tool, allocating resources according to the labour-time they represent is most likely not useful as a general economic principle (it could be useful in specific areas of activity).

One feasible alternative to Dieterich's labour-equivalents is a new type of digital credit system, in which people gain or lose credits (and therefore gain or lose access to resources) depending on what they verifiably do, and on what age they are. This alternative has not yet been very popular among socialist theorists, because generations of socialists have been educated in the idea that socialism aims to abolish monetary instruments, and because the idea seems to many to be too close to "social-democratic subsidization" or "funny money" social credit theories. Nevertheless, monetary transactions in modern capitalism are increasingly only digital credits and debits, the technology exists to make transactions by mobile phone, and more than 90% of all money in developed capitalist countries is bank money, not cash or cash deposits.

=== Ongoing debate ===
The international debate is still continuing. How progressive the Soviet Union really was is still being debated even today, for example by Bob Allen in his book Farm to factory. For some socialist economists, the socialist economy is an end in itself, for others it is only a means to an end. Some socialist theorists (such as Paul W. Cockshott) are monothetic theorists: they wish the whole of the economy to be dominated by one economic principle, such as labour-value, or a few basic economic principles. Other socialist theorists (like Alec Nove) are pluralist theorists, believing that the economy functions best if there is a variety of different systems for producing/distributing different kinds of products and services, using a variety of property forms.

Historical research is being done on the commons, often inspired by Elinor Ostrom. This is an attempt to understand empirically how people were able to manage land use collectively for 500 years or more, without significant state support or supervision. (Note: In 2014, the Review of Radical Political Economics features a special issue on the commons.) A frequent complaint in the discussion is that socialists, like their liberal and conservative counterparts, confuse an ethical principle of resource allocation (the "why") with the economic technique of resource allocation (the "how") – the result being an economic policy in which the means and the ends are confused.

In almost any society, market and non-market methods of allocating resources are in practice combined, which is acknowledged in official national accounts by the inclusion of market and non-market sectors. The real question for economists is how the two can be combined to achieve the best economic result for citizens, and what the effect is of market and non-market methods on each other. (Note: See e.g. the works of János Kornai.) This can be a highly politicized and contentious dispute, since the chosen methods can advantage some and disadvantage others; it is very difficult to devise allocation methods which distribute the gains and losses of economic policy in an equal or equitable way among all economic actors.

Typically, pro-capitalist theorists argue that "there is no alternative to the market", and the anti-capitalists argue that markets could not even exist without many non-market mechanisms and supports (i.e. marketisation merely shifts the burden of unpaid work effort onto someone else). Almost all modern economies are "mixed economies" meaning that they combine market allocation of resources with non-market allocation, in various ways. That is why the modern economic controversies are almost always about the relative importance which different kinds of allocation mechanisms should have. This debate is, of course, very strongly influenced by the income which the different economic actors can get, if particular economic policies are realized.

== Criticism ==
Traditionally, criticism of Marx's law of value has been of three kinds, i.e. conceptual, logical and empirical.

=== Conceptual criticism ===
The conceptual criticism concerns the concept of value itself.

For Marx, economic value in capitalist society was an objectified social characteristic of labour-products, exchanged in an economic community, given the physical reality that products took a definite amount of society's labour-time to produce, for a given demand. A product had a value, regardless of what any particular person might think about it, priced or unpriced (see value-form). Marx regarded the law of value as analogous to an objective physical law, since people could never escape from the fact that the products they consumed presupposed an objective cost in human labour time. Critics however argue that economic value is something purely subjective, i.e. a personal valuation determined by personal preferences and marginal utility; only prices are objective. One of the first Marx-critics to argue this was the Austrian Eugen Böhm von Bawerk. Marx himself never denied that subjective valuations existed, but argued rather that they co-existed with objective values which were ultimately not determined by preferences but by real production costs.

In the real world, many prices are not "objectively manifest" either—they are only ideal prices used for the purpose of calculation, accounting and estimation, not actually charged or applying directly to any real transaction. Yet, these notional prices can nevertheless influence economic behaviour, inasmuch as the prices estimated affect expectations of incomes and expenditures. Economists then debate about when a price can be said to be "objective".

Marx argues that products have different objective costs of production, reducible to different amounts of labour-time. Against this view, one could also argue that the physical amounts of comparable resources (such as energy, land, water, etc.), necessary to manufacture a car, are much larger than resources necessary for growing a carrot, explaining why the cost (and, hence, minimal price) of a car is larger than the cost of a carrot. In other words, it is the total input costs (including costs of labour), not the amount of labour per se, which create the difference in costs (and, therefore minimal equilibrium prices) of the goods. However, Marx argues in the first chapters of Das Kapital that most of such costs (i.e. insofar as they refer to reproducible goods) are again reducible to direct and indirect costs in human labour time. When we see a car, we do not see the worldwide cooperation of labour-efforts that produced it at a certain cost, yet those labour efforts, weighed against other labour efforts, determine its value.

Austrian economics explicitly rejects the objectivity of the values of goods as logically and conceptually unsound. On this view, we cannot validly say that products took a certain amount of labour, energy and materials to make, and compare them on that basis. It follows that the Austrian School thinks most contemporary economic theory is invalid, as it relies in one way or another on the aggregation and comparison of actual and ideal prices. This is forcefully argued by Friedrich von Hayek who therefore was skeptical about the objectivity of macroeconomic aggregations as such. However, this raises the question of "what is the explanatory power of Austrian economics", if all we can say about a realized price is that it expresses a subjective preference, given that there are billions of subjective preferences which are all different.

Ecologists and environmentalists have criticized Marx on the ground that natural resources have (or should have) a value which has nothing to do with production costs in labour time, because in fact they are entropic non-reproducible goods. However, Marx himself never denied this; he was merely referring to the bourgeois valuation scheme, originating from commercial trade, double-entry bookkeeping, private property theory and the theory of prices. Precisely because natural resources were for a long time either non-reproducible or freely available goods (i.e. not reproducible commodities) the whole tendency in the market economy was for those resources to be plundered for private gain, rather than economized appropriately. Their "value" became apparent only when they became scarce.

Ecologists also note that Marxist theories of value caused large-scale environmental problems in the industrialization of the Soviet Union, China and other countries ruled by communist parties; thus, whether or not an economy is a market economy or a state economy does not seem to make much difference, the problem is rather with the values of human cultures themselves or with industrialization processes as such. This more complex debate cannot be dealt with in this article; it may be noted only that newly industrializing countries to a large extent imitated technical methods used in industrialized countries, and that Marx can hardly be held responsible for all the things done in his name—he had explicitly referred to problems of environmental despoilation quite a number of times, including in Das Kapital. He never dealt systematically with socialist economics, amongst other things because he lacked an evidential basis for theorizing about that.

=== Logical criticism ===
The logical criticism revolves around the idea that Marx is unable to reconcile the domain of value relations and the domain of price relations, showing exactly how value magnitudes correspond to price magnitudes.

Various arguments are made to show that Marx's theory of value is logically incoherent. The most famous of these is the controversy about Marx's prices of production, sometimes called the transformation problem in which it is argued that total output value must equal total output production prices, and total profits must equal total surplus value, so that the distributions of particular output values and output prices can then be inferred from each other, via mathematical functions and a tidy accounting sum, assuming the same rate of profit on capital invested by all sectors. However, it cannot be proved, whether logically or empirically, that the total output value is equivalent to total output production prices, or, for that matter, that total profit equals total surplus-value. On that ground alone, many critics argue, there is already no proof that there is any necessary quantitative relationship between them (Marx simply assumes that relationship, but does not prove it). If that is so, then, the critics argue, there is no sense in which the Marxian product-values can explain market prices for products as the determinants of those prices. An additional problem discovered in mathematical modelling is that the assumption of the identity of total production prices and total values (or the identity of total surplus value and total profits) cannot be maintained simultaneously with the assumption that the rate of profit on production capital is the same for all industries—to create a consistent theory requires making additional assumptions.

Although this is often overlooked by economists Marx himself used a uniform rate of profit for all industries in Capital Vol. 3 only for modelling purposes, to show in a simple way how the ruling profit rates on capital impacted on the development of production system, and he explicitly denied that a uniform rate of profit obtained in reality; he only argued that at any time there would exist an average "minimum acceptable" profit rate on capital invested in industries, and if there was no realistic possibility at all of reaching at least that profit rate sometime in the future, capital would very likely be disinvested after a while, since the relevant business would then simply lack commercial viability; alternatively, the business would be taken over, and restructured to restore an acceptable profit rate. This minimum profit rate applying to new investments is closely linked to the ruling interest rates applicable to producing enterprises. Marx's "general rate of profit" specifically represents the "minimum profit rate" on capital, below which the producers, in the normal run of events, cannot stay in business for long. It is neither an empirical average of many profit rates, nor merely a theoretical ratio, but a real systemic constraint.

Marx and Engels explicitly denied that in reality total product-value would be equal to the total of production prices (see prices of production). Such an "accounting identity" was ruled out in the real world by continual variations in labour productivity and because, at any time, no competitive force existed that could exactly cancel out the difference between goods sold above value and goods sold below value. It was also ruled out by the imperfections of the price-form itself, which, the fetishization of price statistics notwithstanding, permitted the expression of product-values only in an approximate way (see real prices and ideal prices). At best—Marx assumed—there was a reasonably close correspondence between total product-value and total production prices. He believed economic fluctuations implied that if some products were sold below their value, this necessarily meant that other products were sold above their value, and vice versa. The divergence between total product-values and total production prices on the whole was, Marx believed, probably not so very large, in an open, competitive market within the domestic economy, where enormous price-value discrepancies were ordinarily impossible to maintain commercially for any length of time.

A measuring unit of value can exist only as a theoretical entity (or as an ideal price comparable to an empirical price) which is also exactly how Marx used it in his simplified illustrations of value relationships. He simply uses a number for the value-quantity and another number for the price-quantity, to indicate a proportion. Empirically, one can only get as far as establishing a "grand average" for the price of an hour of work (this is often referred to in Marxian economics as the "monetary equivalent of labour time", or MELT) and one can discuss the extent to which labour is undervalued or overvalued in a relative (comparative) sense. This interpretation is not accepted by all Marxist scholars, because—the critics argue—all price-value differentials among different outputs are necessarily and by definition cancelled out at the aggregate level, not just in an assumed theoretical model, but in reality. They point to passages where Marx suggests that the sum of product-values must be equal to the sum of production prices, implying that there can never be more new product-value or less product-value than is expressed by the sum total of output production prices. If they argue that equality does not hold, then there cannot be any determinate quantitative relationship between production prices and product-values.

Product-values in Marx's sense quite simply cannot be directly observed, only inferred from the actual behaviour of trading relations. In that regard, Marx's concept of ""value" has exactly the same status as the official category of "value added" (which is an inferred magnitude). Product-values manifest themselves and can only be expressed as trading ratios, (ideal) prices, or quantities of labour-time, and therefore the academic "transformation controversy" is according to many modern Marxist theorists misguided; it rests simply on a false interpretation of the relationship between the value-form of commodities and the price-form. What Marx really meant by the "transformation" was that the direct regulation of the exchange-value of commodities according to their labour-value is, in a capitalist mode of production, transformed into the regulation of the exchange of commodities by their production prices—reflecting the fact, that the supply of commodities in capitalist society has become conditional on the accumulation of capital, and therefore on profit margins ("no profit, no sale"). As soon as we admit that product-prices may fluctuate above or below the socially average product-values for all kinds of reasons—a central determinant of market dynamics—the quantitative relationship between product-values and product-prices is at best probabilistic, not a fixed function of some type. The structure of Marx's argument in Capital Vol. 3 is that there is a constant contradiction in capitalism between the inescapable labour-costs incurred to produce products, and the laws of price competition which create pressure to maximize the return on capital invested—a contradiction which must constantly be mediated in practice, bringing about the "real movement" of the production system (ideally, capitalists would prefer just to trade assets without the nuisance and trouble of hiring labor, but the assets have to be produced, that production requires labor, and therefore that labor has to be organized in a commercially effective way).

The only way to transcend the scientific "arbitrariness" to which the young Marx already referred, was by understanding and theorizing the dynamics of the capitalist system as a whole, integrating all the different economic forces at work into a unified, coherent theory that could withstand the test of scientific criticism. Thus, Marx's value theory offers an interpretation, generalisation or explanation concerning the "grand averages" of the relative price movements of products, and of economic behaviour in capitalist production as a social system, but it is not possible to deduce specific real product-prices from product-values according to some mathematical function, among other things because, to find labour-values, a relationship between product-prices and labour hours worked must already be assumed. What we can verify is as follows:

- How systems of exchange have functioned in history.
- To what extent production-costs and the ruling profit rates actually determine market prices for products.
- The relationship between hours worked and outputs produced.
- Whether the capitalist production system does indeed evolve historically in the way predicted by value theory.

=== Empirical criticism ===
The empirical criticism is that Marx's law of value contradicts the known facts about the allocation of resources in capitalist society.

The main empirical criticism is simply that there is no observable quantitative correspondence at all between changes in relative expenditures of labour-time, and changes in relative market prices of products, however measured (the measures are also contested, for example on the ground that qualitatively different kinds of labour cannot be compared and equated). Most critics have tried to refute Marx's theory with a mathematical model, rather than looking at real data to see if the capitalist economy really behaves in the way Marx claims it does.

A recent empirical criticism has to do with what Marxists call "financialization". In developed capitalist economies, the majority of workers and capital assets no longer directly participate in the production of new commodities by private enterprise. Many workers work in service industries which manage, maintain or distribute already existing resources. That is the result of two centuries of industrialization and mechanization in developed capitalist countries (plus outsourcing to newly industrializing economies). The bulk of capital assets in developed capitalist countries are not physical means of production used by private enterprise to create new commodities; they are financial assets, real estate and other types of property not used for production. This means that human labour is no longer regarded as the mainspring of wealth-creation, and it raises the question of how the law of value could, in that case, be a regulative force in the allocation of resources, or how it could determine prices. According to Professor Hillel Ticktin:

We see the constant tendency to replace the law of value with administration, resulting in increasing bureaucracy, both private and public, managerialism and a tendency to authoritarianism.

This issue has not yet been resolved, because there is little scientific agreement about how the "real economy" (producing goods and services) and the "financial economy" (trading property and assets) are related to each other, or how the "developed world" is related economically to the "developing world". Because "globalization" can mean almost anything, it does not explain anything about the world economy. Additionally, although Marxists have written many articles in which they very precisely try to classify productive and unproductive labour, there has been no comprehensive organizational analysis of the modern division of labour, or a critical analysis of the statistical categories used to understand it.

== Responses to criticism ==
These three lines of criticism lead the critics to the conclusion that Marx's law of value is metaphysical and theoretically useless.

Austrian economics goes a step further by attributing no special objective meaning to price levels at all, which it considers a mere "statistical outcome" of comparisons between each party's ratios between the value of money (taken to be just another kind of a good) to values of goods being sold or purchased. The prices, therefore, are knowledge, which may (or may not) influence behaviour of economic agents differently in each particular case. However, it can be argued that this approach is inconsistent, insofar as nothing in their theory entitles the Austrians to aggregate prices at all; because each price expresses a unique subjective preference, adding up prices is like adding up apples and pears; each price refers to a unique set of circumstances. If the Austrians are correct, there can really be nothing "objective" about the "statistical outcome"—it is merely an interpretation based on numerous valuation assumptions.

Marx himself thought that the concept of value was necessary to explain the historical origins, the development and mode of functioning of capitalism as a social system, under conditions where traded, priced assets were only a subset of total assets possessing a potential exchange-value. Short-term price fluctuations could not say anything about the long-term development of the capitalist production system; that required an analysis of the determinants of long-term average price movements, and structural factors. According to primitive economics, all prices are of the same kind and differ only quantitatively; they only express more or less money, and can only go up or down. For Marx, this idea was not only false, but totally absurd, since different kinds of prices can assume different valuation principles, contractual obligations, conditionalities, inclusions/exclusions as well as relationships between economic actors. Different kinds of prices express different kinds of trading relationships. Marx noted that the forms prices take are highly variegated, and he drew a sharp distinction between real prices and ideal prices. That is why businessmen assumed a theory of value, even if they were not aware that they were doing it. The scientific theory merely made explicit what they were implicitly assuming for the purpose of doing business.

The economists assumed all sorts of things about an economy and economic actors, in order to build models of price behaviour; Marx thought those assumptions themselves needed to be looked at and theorised consistently, based on insight into the historical formation of economic categories. However, his critics claim that his own approach has hidden assumptions as well, and that these assumptions contradict praxeology. Marx anticipated this criticism, which he regarded as very shallow. In his pamphlet Wages, price and profit (1865), Marx argues that the way economic relationships observably appear to the individual is often the inverse of the real process, considered as a whole. It is perfectly possible not only to participate in market trade without much knowledge of markets and their overall effects, but also to participate in markets with a false or one-sided interpretation of what is really going on in the exchanges. After all, the participants in trading activity all have their own interest in the matter, and look at it from their own point of view. In this sense, Marx warns that market trade can stimulate all sorts of delusions about what relationships are really involved. Marx also argued that if one could not explain the simplest cases of an economic phenomenon, one could not explain all its variations either; in fact, one could not explain anything at all.

Marxists often assumed that Marx provided a theoretical system of what they call "the totality" (the whole economy, or the whole of society).

== See also ==
- Abstract labour and concrete labour
- Capital accumulation
- Cambridge capital controversy
- Consumer capitalism
- Cost-of-production theory of value
- Critique of political economy
- Criticisms of the labour theory of value
- Entitlement
- Exploitation of labour
- Marxian economics
- Occupational inequality
- Primitive accumulation of capital
- Rentier capitalism
- Rent-seeking
- Socially necessary labour time
- Structural abuse
- Underearners Anonymous
- Use value
- Valorisation
- Value-form
