= The Poverty of Philosophy =

1847 French-language book by Karl Marx

Title page of the 1910 Charles H. Kerr & Co. edition of Marx's The Poverty of Philosophy. The book was translated by British socialist Harry Quelch.

The Poverty of Philosophy (French: Misère de la philosophie) is a book by Karl Marx published in Paris and Brussels in 1847, where he lived in exile from 1843 until 1849. It was originally written in French as a critique of the economic and philosophical theory of mutualism as proposed by French anarchist Pierre-Joseph Proudhon set forth in his 1846 book The System of Economic Contradictions, or The Philosophy of Poverty.

== History ==
=== The ideas of Proudhon ===
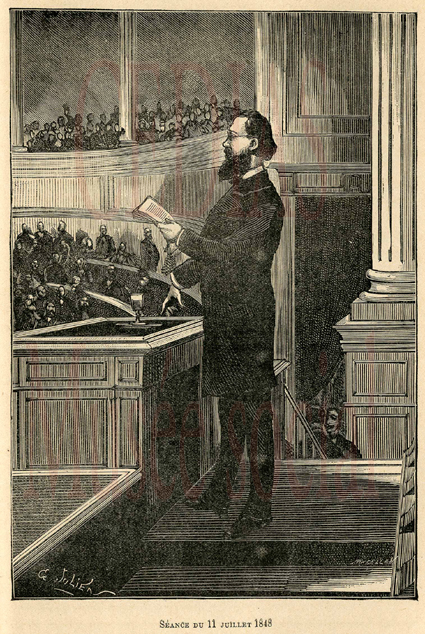
Proudhon addressing the French Assembly in July 1848.

Pierre-Joseph Proudhon (1809–1865) was a French anarchist theoretician who wrote extensively on the relationship between the individual and the state. Proudhon believed in an orderly society but argued that the state represented an illegitimate concentration of official violence which effectively undercut any effort to build a just society. Proudhon rejected all political action as a form of class collaboration but argued instead that the working class could achieve its salvation through economic action alone; abstention from politics was advocated with a view to the ultimate eradication of the existing state and its political apparatus.

Proudhon believed that the stateless future was not preordained by iron laws of history, but was rather to be the conscious creation of a population which had been morally awakened. This necessary morality, based upon honesty, decency, self-respect, and individual responsibility, was believed to be an inherent part of the working class—something to be developed and emphasized.

By way of contrast, industrialists, businessmen, and those who serve them were held to be incapable of developing this morality due to the nature of their day-to-day economic and political activity. The act of labor itself was believed to be socially ennobling, whereas the act of economic exploitation backed by political force was held to be inherently corrupting. Therefore, Proudhon emphatically declared for a strict separatism between the working class and all others.

=== Karl Marx in exile ===
Karl Marx left Germany following the repression of the newspaper he edited, the Rheinische Zeitung, by the government of Prussia early in 1843. He landed in Paris, where he lived from October 1843 until December 1845. It was there that he first met Proudhon, who was already a well known radical writer, with four books to his credit. Despite an appeal being made as a prospective French collaborator, Proudhon declined to participate in the ill-fated Deutsch-Französische Jahrbücher (German-French Yearbook) project with which Marx was intimately associated.

Although the personal contact between the two was limited, Marx read Proudhon's writings at this time, discussions of which may be found in his work of the period, including the book written against Bruno Bauer, The Holy Family (1845), and the unpublished Economic and Philosophic Manuscripts of 1844. In the published book Marx lent critical support to some of the ideas of Proudhon against competing ideas of Bauer.

Marx was particularly attracted to the comprehensive nature of Proudhon's writings up to 1845 and the latter's willingness to make larger connections from smaller observations. In his book What Is Property? Proudhon emphasized the social relationships emerging from private property, and the tendency of economic development to produce a propertyless proletariat in ever increasing numbers—ideas which Marx found compelling. Marx's praise of Proudhon was not limitless, however, as he felt Proudhon did not fully grasp the way in which wages and money, for example, were themselves forms of private property.

Marx was forced to exit Paris by the French government in 1845, with Brussels, Belgium his next destination. Despite his departure from France, he continued to see Proudhon as a potential political collaborator, asking him in 1846 to participate in a new international correspondence committee patterned after the London-based Workers' Educational Association, designed to propagate socialist ideas among the working class of continental Europe. Proudhon responded cautiously to Marx's appeal. Perhaps partially in consequence, Marx and his friend and political associate turned their organizing efforts to an established political body, the League of the Just.

=== Marx's The Poverty of Philosophy ===
Marx read Proudhon's book late in 1846 and responded strongly and negatively, writing a lengthy letter to his Russian correspondent P.V. Annenkov on December 28, 1846 with a detailed exposition of his views that became the core of his 1847 book. He began working on a book-length formal reply the following January, completing the work in the spring and going to press in April 1847.

The book, formally titled The Poverty of Philosophy: Answer to the Philosophy of Poverty by M. Proudhon, saw print in Brussels and Belgium early in July 1847. The book was written in the French language to strike its target most closely and for the cutting pun of a title to be rendered most unmistakably. The book was regarded by the political circle around Marx organized as the Communist League as a key part of their contemporary program, delineating the views of the League from those espoused by Proudhon and his followers.

Somewhat surprisingly, following its initial release in 1847, The Poverty of Philosophy was never republished in full prior to Marx's death in 1883. The first German edition of the book was first published in 1885; a Russian language translation by the Emancipation of Labor group (Освобождение труда) was released in 1886. A corrected Second French Edition materialized in 1896, initiated by Friedrich Engels and completed after his death by Marx's daughter, Laura Lafargue.

The first English language edition of The Poverty of Philosophy was unveiled in London in 1900 by the pioneer Marxist publisher Twentieth Century Press. The translation for this edition was made by British socialist Harry Quelch. Quelch's version was reprised in the United States for the first time in 1910 by Charles H. Kerr & Co., a socialist publishing house based in Chicago.

== Content ==
The tone of Marx's polemic against Proudhon is set from the outset, with a witty cut in lieu of a foreword:

"M. Proudhon has the misfortune of being particularly misunderstood in Europe. In France, he has the right to be a bad economist, because he is reputed to be a good German philosopher. In Germany, he has the right to be a bad philosopher, because he is reputed to be one of the ablest of French economists. Being both a German and an economist at the same time, we desire to protest against this double error.... —Karl Marx, Brussels, June 15, 1847."

Although prominently featuring the word "philosophy" in its title, The Poverty of Philosophy is essentially a book dealing with the subject of critique of political economy. Its first English-language translator Harry Quelch claimed that the work contained "the groundwork of the theories so fully elaborated in Capital, apart from its exhaustive analysis of the capitalist system of production and distribution" as well as law of value. Marx cites the Science of Logic of Hegel. to apply the method of dialectics to political economy, and rejects Proudhon's ideas on a consumption tax and against a strike action. At the end of the book, he cites the words of George Sand: "Combat or Death: Bloody struggle or extinction. It is thus that the question is inexorably put." He also cites the theory of John Gray. Indeed, the book has been called by one Soviet scholar "one of the first works of mature Marxism."

In The Poverty of Philosophy, Marx argues that in acquiring new productive forces, people change their mode of production, in turn changing their social relations.

== Legacy ==
In 1956 economist Joan Robinson proclaimed in a review of a new British edition of The Poverty of Philosophy that from the standpoint of modern economics Marx's polemic with Proudhon was "a dead horse" of only "highly specialised interest." She wrote:

"The entertainment value...is not great. There is no wit in The Poverty of Philosophy apart from its title; Proudhon's ideas were confused enough to begin with, and Marx's presentation of them makes them totally unseizable, so that there is little sport to be got out of following the argument. All the same for anyone interested in 'What Marx Really Meant' some passages in this book are very valuable. In some ways they bear the same relation to Capital that Marshall's Pure Theory does to his Principles. Ideas that are clear in the early and short version were later elaborated into obscurity."

Although a widely recognized and periodically reissued title, The Poverty of Philosophy is not regarded as one of the fundamental works of Marxist thought, exemplified by its omission from the two volume Karl Marx: Selected Works published simultaneously in several countries in the 1930s under the auspices of the Marx-Engels-Lenin Institute of Moscow.

A new translation of the work appeared in conjunction with the publication of Volume 6 of the joint Soviet-British-American publication of Marx-Engels Collected Works in 1975.

"Poverty of Philosophy" is the title of a song by rapper Immortal Technique.

The title is referenced in Karl Popper's 1957 book "The Poverty of Historicism".
