= Economic Problems of Socialism in the USSR =

1951 work by Joseph Stalin

Economic Problems of Socialism in the USSR (Russian: Экономические проблемы социализма в СССР, romanized: Ekonomicheskiye problemy sotsializma v SSSR) is a work of political economy written by Joseph Stalin in 1951. It was one of the last works published before his death. In it, he made the claim that the Soviet Union had reached the lower stage of communism. The main impetus for the book came from the discussions around the preparations for a new textbook on political economy that would be standard throughout the communist movement. One of the main theoretical debates was on whether the law of value still operated within a socialist economy; some economists stated that Karl Marx in Das Kapital had only meant for it to apply to capitalist exchange. Stalin insisted that it still operated under a socialist economy. Nonetheless, he argued that it was a historical and not eternal law and that it would disappear in the second higher stage of communism. Under socialism, it was necessary for commodity exchange and trained "business executives to conduct production on rational lines and disciplines them". Stalin laid the book out as plan for the transition to full communism but insisted that objective economic laws would still have to be followed.

== Content ==
The main topics discussed are the following:

1. Character of Economic Laws Under Socialism
2. Commodity Production Under Socialism
3. The Law of Value Under Socialism
4. Abolition of the Antithesis Between Town and Country, and Between Mental and Physical Labour, and Elimination of Distinctions Between Them
5. Disintegration of the Single World Market and Deepening of the Crisis of the World Capitalist System
6. Inevitability of Wars Between Capitalist Countries
7. The Basic Economic Laws of Modern Capitalism and of Socialism

Regarding the law of value and commodity production, Stalin wrote, "[I]t is chiefly the form, the outward appearance of the old categories of capitalism that have remained in our country, but that their essence has radically changed in adaptation to the requirements of the development of the socialist economy."

Stalin stated that wars between capitalist nations were still inevitable, a position that Eugene Varga had disputed.

== Interpretations in China ==
Economic Problems of Socialism in the USSR was immediately translated upon its release and became a foundational political economy text in the People's Republic of China in 1952. It was influential in discussions of public and collective ownership and the law of value under socialism.

During the first Zhengzhou Conference (November 2, 1958 to November 10, 1958), Mao Zedong, chairman of the Chinese Communist Party, wrote a letter on November 9 suggesting that leading cadres at all levels carefully read Stalin's work.

The book was later criticised by Mao Zedong in A Critique of Soviet Economics.

Early market socialist economists in both the Soviet Union and China would use these words of Stalin to justify market reforms. In his 1981 work China's Socialist Economy, Xue Muqiao would use Stalin's book as a justification for using the market mechanism in the primary stage of socialism. Xue also introduced the term "underdeveloped socialism" in his book China's Socialist Economy. The book was written in the orthodox Marxist–Leninist framework enunciated by Stalin in Economic Problems of Socialism in the USSR. Xue wrote that within the socialist mode of production there were several phases and for China to reach an advanced form of socialism it had to focus on developing the productive forces. He proposed a theory in which the basic laws of economic growth were those in which "the relations of production must conform to the level of the productive forces". Similar to Stalin, Xue considered the productive forces to be primary and that the relations of production had to conform to the level of the productive forces. Xue believed that this was a fundamental universal law of economics.

== Sources ==
- Evans, Alfred B. (1993). Soviet Marxism–Leninism: The Decline of an Ideology. ABC-CLIO. ISBN 9780275947637.
- McCarthy, Greg (1985). Brugger, Bill (ed.). Chinese Marxism in Flux, 1978–1984: Essays on Epistemology, Ideology, and Political Economy. M. E. Sharpe. ISBN 0873323238.
- Mommen, André (2011). Stalin's Economist: The Economic Contributions of Jenö Varga. Routledge. ISBN 9781136793455.
- Pollock, Ethan (2006). Stalin and the Soviet Science Wars. Princeton University Press. ISBN 9780691124674.
- Ramana, R. (June 1983). "Reviewed Work: China's Socialist Economy by Xue Muqiao". Social Scientist. 11 (6): 68–74. doi:10.2307/3516910. JSTOR 3516910.
