= Relations of production =

Concept in Marxism

Relations of production (German: Produktionsverhältnisse) It is first explicitly used in Marx's published book The Poverty of Philosophy, although Marx and Engels had already defined the term in The German Ideology which was only published posthumously in 1932.

Some social relations are voluntary or freely chosen (i.e. a person chooses to associate with another person or a group). But other social relations are involuntary, i.e. people can be socially related, whether they like that or not, because they are part of a family (i.e. biosocial kinship) a group, an organization, a community, a nation, etc.

By "relations of production", Marx and Engels meant the sum total of social relationships that people must enter into in order to survive, to produce, and to reproduce their means of life. As people must enter into these social relationships, i.e. because participation in them is not voluntary, the totality of these relationships, along with the forces of production, constitute a relatively stable and permanent structure, the "economic base or foundation" or mode of production.

The term "relations of production" is somewhat vague, for two main reasons:

- The German word Verhältnis can mean "relation", "proportion", or "ratio". Thus, the relationships could be qualitative, quantitative, or both. Which meaning applies can only be established from the context.
- The relations to which Marx refers can be social relationships, economic relationships, or technological relationships.

Marx and Engels typically use the term to refer to the socioeconomic relationships characteristic of a specific epoch; for example: a capitalist's exclusive relationship to a capital good, and a wage worker's consequent relation to the capitalist; a feudal lord's relationship to a fief, and the serf's consequent relation to the lord; a slavemaster's relationship to their slave; etc. It is contrasted with and also affected by what Marx called the forces of production.

== How Marx uses the concept ==
Here are four famous quotations showing Marx's use of the concept of relations of production:

In the social production of their existence, men inevitably enter into definite relations, which are independent of their will, namely relations of production appropriate to a given stage in the development of their material forces of production. The totality of these relations of production constitutes the economic structure of society, the real foundation, on which arises a legal and political superstructure and to which correspond definite forms of social consciousness. The mode of production of material life conditions the general process of social, political and intellectual life. It is not the consciousness of men that determines their existence, but their social existence that determines their consciousness. At a certain stage of development, the material productive forces of society come into conflict with the existing relations of production or – this merely expresses the same thing in legal terms – with the property relations within the framework of which they have operated hitherto. From forms of development of the productive forces these relations turn into their fetters. Then begins an era of social revolution. The changes in the economic foundation lead sooner or later to the transformation of the whole immense superstructure.

— 1859 Preface to A Contribution to the Critique of Political Economy

Economic categories are only the theoretical expressions, the abstractions of the social relations of production, M. Proudhon, holding this upside down like a true philosopher, sees in actual relations nothing but the incarnation of the principles, of these categories, which were slumbering – so M. Proudhon the philosopher tells us – in the bosom of the "impersonal reason of humanity." M. Proudhon the economist understands very well that men make cloth, linen, or silk materials in definite relations of production. But what he has not understood is that these definite social relations are just as much produced by men as linen, flax, etc. Social relations are closely bound up with productive forces. In acquiring new productive forces men change their mode of production; and in changing their mode of production, in changing the way of earning their living, they change all their social relations. The hand-mill gives you society with the feudal lord; the steam-mill society with the industrial capitalist. The same men who establish their social relations in conformity with the material productivity, produce also principles, ideas, and categories, in conformity with their social relations. Thus the ideas, these categories, are as little eternal as the relations they express. They are historical and transitory products. ... The production relations of every society form a whole.

— The Poverty of Philosophy

We have seen that the capitalist process of production is a historically determined form of the social process of production in general. The latter is as much a production process of material conditions of human life as a process taking place under specific historical and economic production relations, producing and reproducing these production relations themselves, and thereby also the bearers of this process, their material conditions of existence and their mutual relations, i.e., their particular socio-economic form. For the aggregate of these relations, in which the agents of this production stand with respect to Nature and to one another, and in which they produce, is precisely society, considered from the standpoint of its economic structure. Like all its predecessors, the capitalist process of production proceeds under definite material conditions, which are, however, simultaneously the bearers of definite social relations entered into by individuals in the process of reproducing their life. Those conditions, like these relations, are on the one hand prerequisites, on the other hand results and creations of the capitalist process of production; they are produced and reproduced by it.

— Das Kapital, Vol. III, Ch. 48

...Wakefield discovered that in the Colonies, property in money, means of subsistence, machines, and other means of production, does not as yet stamp a man as a capitalist if there be wanting the correlative — the wage-worker, the other man who is compelled to sell himself of his own free-will. He discovered that capital is not a thing, but a social relation between persons, established by the instrumentality of things. Mr. Peel, he moans, took with him from England to Swan River, West Australia, means of subsistence and of production to the amount of £50,000. Mr. Peel had the foresight to bring with him, besides, 3,000 persons of the working-class, men, women, and children. Once arrived at his destination, “Mr. Peel was left without a servant to make his bed or fetch him water from the river.” Unhappy Mr. Peel, who provided for everything except the export of English modes of production to Swan River!

— Karl Marx, Das Kapital, Vol. I, Ch. 33, courtesy of www.marxists.org

(In other words, the English relations of production did not exist in Australia; there was no system of property rights and legal obligations and no economic necessity compelling workers to work for their boss. The servants therefore could leave Mr. Peel in order to find work or occupy free land to make a better living.)

== Definitions ==
A social relation can be defined, in the first instance, as

- a relation between individuals insofar as they belong to a group, or
- a relation between groups, or
- a relation between an individual and a group

The group could be an ethnic or kinship group, a social institution or organisation, a social class, a nation or gender etc.

A social relation is therefore not simply identical with an interpersonal relation or an individual relation, although all these types of relations presuppose each other. A social relation refers to a common social characteristic of a group of people.

Society for Marx is the sum total of social relations connecting its members.

Social relations of production in Marx's sense refer to

- (often legally encoded) ownership and control relations pertaining to society's productive assets,
- the way people are formally and informally associated within the economic sphere of production, including as social classes,
- co-operative work relations (including household labor),
- socio-economic dependencies between people arising from the way they produce and reproduce their existence,
- relationships between different worksites or production sites
- the quantitative proportions of different aspects of the sphere of production, considered from the point of view of society as a whole.

The totality of social relations of production constitute the social structure of the economy, which according to Marx determine how incomes, products and assets will be distributed.

== Social/technical distinction and reification ==
Combined with the productive forces, the relations of production constitute a historically specific mode of production. Karl Marx contrasts the social relations of production with the technical relations of production; in the former case, it is people (subjects) who are related, in the latter case, the relation is between people and objects in the physical world they inhabit (those objects are, in the context of production, what Marx calls the "means of labor" or means of production).

However, Marx argues that with the rise of market economy, this distinction is increasingly obscured and distorted. In particular, a cash economy makes it possible to define, symbolise and manipulate relationships between things that people make in abstraction from the social and technical relations involved. Marx says this leads to the reification (thingification or Verdinglichung) of economic relations, of which commodity fetishism is a prime example.

The community of men, or the manifestation of the nature of men, their mutual complementing the result of which is species-life, truly human life—this community is conceived by political economy in the form of exchange and trade. Society, says Destutt de Tracy, is a series of mutual exchanges. It is precisely this process of mutual integration. Society, says Adam Smith, is a commercial society. Each of its members is a merchant. It is seen that political economy defines the estranged form of social intercourse as the essential and original form corresponding to man's nature.

— Karl Marx, Notes on James Mill

The marketplace seems to be a place where all people have free and equal access and freely negotiate and bargain over deals and prices on the basis of civil equality. People will buy and sell goods without really knowing where they originated or who made them. They know that objectively they depend on producers and consumers somewhere else, that this social dependency exists, but they do not know who specifically those people are or what their activities are. Market forces seem to regulate everything, but what is really behind those market forces has become obscured, because the social relationship between people or their relation with nature is expressed as a commercial relationship between things (money, commodities, capital) (see also value-form).

Some social relations of production therefore exist in an objective, mind-independent way, not simply because they are a natural necessity for human groups, but because of the mediation of social and technical relations by commerce. In addition to creating new social and technical relations, commerce introduces a proliferation of relationships between tradeable 'things'. Not only do relationships between 'things' (commodities, prices etc.) begin to indicate and express social and technical relations, the commercial relations also begin to govern and regulate the pattern of human contact and technique.

The fact therefore that particular social relations of production acquire an objective, mind-independent existence may not be due to any natural necessity asserting itself but only to a purely social necessity: commodity exchange objectifies social relations to the point where they escape from conscious human control, and exist such that they can be recognised only by abstract thought.

== Relations of distribution ==
Under Marxism, “Relations of Distribution” concern the organization of a system through which products can be supplied. They encompass the position of men in the distribution process and the level of control they maintain over access to products, the frequency with which these goods can be obtained, and the resources needed for their distribution, taking into account the product’s nature, the labor force, and transportation. They also concern the administration and division of gross income through various revenues, along with the allocation of expenses involved in distribution and redistribution.

One of the theoretical problems in Marxian economics is to distinguish exactly between relations of production and relations of distribution, determining the significance of each in the allocation of resources. According to the crudest and most vulgar interpretations of Das Kapital, exploitation occurs only at the point of production. Marx himself obviously did not assert this at all, he only postulated the command over the surplus labour of others as the basis of the existence of capital and its economic power.

Marx discusses the theoretical problem in two main places: the introduction to the Grundrisse manuscript and in chapter 51 of Das Kapital. In the Grundrisse, where he defines the total economy to include production, circulation, distribution and consumption (similar to James Mill), he raises the following question:

In society... the producer's relation to the product, once the latter is finished, is an external one, and its return to the subject depends on his relations to other individuals. He does not come into possession of it directly. Nor is its immediate appropriation his purpose when he produces in society. Distribution steps between the producers and the products, hence between production and consumption, to determine in accordance with social laws what the producer's share will be in the world of products. Now, does distribution stand at the side of and outside production as an autonomous sphere?

— Karl Marx, Grundrisse

He answers his own question negatively:

The structure [German: Gliederung] of distribution is completely determined by the structure of production. Distribution is itself a product of production, not only in its object, in that only the results of production can be distributed, but also in its form, in that the specific kind of participation in production determines the specific forms of distribution, i.e. the pattern of participation in distribution.

— Karl Marx, Grundrisse

Disagreeing with David Ricardo, who regarded distribution as the proper object of study for economics, Marx argues that the mode of production largely determines the mode of distribution: the source of income and products in production, and their distribution among the population must be analysed within one framework:

In the shallowest conception, distribution appears as the distribution of products, and hence as further removed from and quasi-independent of production. But before distribution can be the distribution of products, it is: (1) the distribution of the instruments of production, and (2), which is a further specification of the same relation, the distribution of the members of the society among the different kinds of production. ... To examine production while disregarding this internal distribution within it is obviously an empty abstraction; while conversely, the distribution of products follows by itself from this distribution which forms an original moment of production.

— Karl Marx, Grundrisse

In the last chapters of Das Kapital Vol 3, he develops the argument, defining relations of distribution as the "forms" which "express the relationships in which the total value newly produced is distributed among the owners of the various agents of production" (as income and products).

His critique of political economy in this regard was (1) that relations of production or distribution are posited as "natural and eternal" rather than as historically specific relations, (2) that forms of distribution of income and products are crucially determined by property relations pertaining to productive assets; (3) that by constantly reproducing the relations of production, the mode of production of capital also reproduces the relations of distribution corresponding to it.

Late in his life, Marx touches on the issue again:

Any distribution whatever of the means of consumption is only a consequence of the distribution of the conditions of production themselves. The latter distribution, however, is a feature of the mode of production itself. The capitalist mode of production, for example, rests on the fact that the material conditions of production are in the hands of nonworkers in the form of property in capital and land, while the masses are only owners of the personal condition of production, of labor power. If the elements of production are so distributed, then the present-day distribution of the means of consumption results automatically. If the material conditions of production are the co-operative property of the workers themselves, then there likewise results a distribution of the means of consumption different from the present one. Vulgar socialism (and from it in turn a section of the democrats) has taken over from the bourgeois economists the consideration and treatment of distribution as independent of the mode of production and hence the presentation of socialism as turning principally on distribution. After the real relation has long been made clear, why retrogress again?

== Criticism of Marx's concept ==
It is frequently objected by Weberian sociologists (those in the tradition of Max Weber) that Marx paid insufficient attention to the intersubjective dimension of social relations, i.e. the meanings consciously attached by people to their social interactions.

However, Marx's argument is that these subjective or intersubjective meanings permit of infinite variations, and therefore cannot be the foundation for a genuine science of society. Individual meanings depend on shared meanings, and these shared meanings arise out of objective circumstances which exist independently of individuals. So one must begin with understanding those objective interdependencies which by necessity shape and socialise human beings, i.e. those social relations which people as social beings must enter into, regardless of what they may think or wish.

In this context, the young Vladimir Lenin commented:

Hitherto, sociologists had found it difficult to distinguish the important and the unimportant in the complex network of social phenomena (that is the root of subjectivism in sociology) and had been unable to discover any objective criterion for such a demarcation. Materialism provided an absolutely objective criterion by singling out "production relations" as the structure of society, and by making it possible to apply to these relations that general scientific criterion of recurrence whose applicability to sociology the subjectivists denied. So long as they confined themselves to ideological social relations (i.e., such as, before taking shape, pass through mans consciousness)—we are, of course, referring all the time to the consciousness of social relations and no others—they could not observe recurrence and regularity in the social phenomena of the various countries, and their science was at best only a description of these phenomena, a collection of raw material. The analysis of material social relations (i.e., of those that take shape without passing through mans consciousness: when exchanging products men enter into production relations without even realising that there is a social relation of production here)—the analysis of material social relations at once made it possible to observe recurrence and regularity and to generalise the systems of the various countries in the single fundamental concept: social formation. It was this generalisation alone that made it possible to proceed from the description of social phenomena (and their evaluation from the standpoint of an ideal) to their strictly scientific analysis, which isolates, let us say by way of example, that which distinguishes one capitalist country from another and investigates that which is common to all of them... Then, however, Marx, who had expressed this hypothesis in the forties, set out to study the factual (nota bene) material. He took one of the social-economic formations—the system of commodity production—and on the basis of a vast mass of data (which he studied for not less than twenty five years) gave a most detailed analysis of the laws governing the functioning of this formation and its development."

In fact, Marx devotes a great amount of attention in Das Kapital to explaining why economic relations appear in human consciousness in the way that they do, and why they might appear in a different way than they really are.

Another sort of criticism, from economists, consists of the observation that processes of distribution (of products and income) can to a considerable extent develop independently or autonomously from what happens in production, with the aid of a developed credit system.

In fact, gross distortions between value added in production, and the distribution of products and incomes, might occur—for example, as a result of underdevelopment, imperialism, state intervention, unequal exchange, fictitious capital, credit bubbles, or capital gains from rising property values.

That is, a society or region might get much more or much less income than the value of what it produces. In that case, there are intermediary agencies between production and consumption influencing the allocation of resources.

Probably Marx would have acknowledged that, but he would presumably have argued that ultimately, the dyssynchrony or distortion between production and distribution would cause a crisis and then a readjustment of distribution to the real structure of production relations.

== See also ==
- Capitalist mode of production
- Critique of political economy
- Law of value
- Non-simultaneity
- Reserve army of labour
- Sociology of space
