= Paper wealth =

Wealth measured by monetary value

Paper wealth means financial assets or possessions as measured by their monetary value, as reflected in the price of assets – how much money one's assets could be sold for. Paper wealth is contrasted with real wealth, which refers to one's actual physical assets. For example, if one owns a house and its assessed value increases (relative to the general price level, i.e., assuming no inflation) then one's paper wealth has increased – the asset has increased in value, meaning it could in principle be sold in exchange for a larger quantity of money, but one's real wealth is unchanged – the real asset is still the same house. It is said that one has "gotten richer on paper," meaning "as an accounting matter": numbers on a balance sheet have changed, but the physical world has not.

The term "paper wealth" is frequently used in popular discussions of wealth and in some critiques of capitalism, finance, and certain economic theories, but is little used in mainstream economics, which instead generally identifies wealth with paper wealth. The term "paper wealth" has some pejorative connotations, suggesting "only on paper (but not in reality)", but can also be used neutrally to mean "(simply) as an accounting matter". Related distinctions are sometimes drawn between real assets and financial assets, or between tangible assets and intangible assets, the latter particularly in accounting, as detailed below.

== Evaporation of paper wealth ==
A confusing aspect of paper wealth is that it can increase or decrease across an entire economy, without any changes to the real economy; this is known as "asset price inflation or deflation" (a change in the aggregate (nominal) level of prices without corresponding real change). Thus, paper wealth does not "come from" or "go to" anywhere – the prices just go up or down. "It's a common misunderstanding to ask, 'where did the money go'?" which is particularly asked in the case of a stock market crash or in the bursting of a price bubble. This has more colorfully been described as "A lot of money goes to money-heaven."

== Accounting ==
Paper wealth is fundamentally an accounting matter – one's net worth is the accounting value of one's assets minus the accounting value of one's liabilities. There are various accounting methods for different assets and liabilities, and they yield different notions of net worth; some methods are more or less volatile than others. For example, one may value ("hold", "mark") assets at book value, meaning the price for which they were purchased; in this case, paper wealth does not change when the potential sale price of an asset changes, but does change if the asset is sold, as the sale proceeds replace the asset. Conversely, one may mark assets at market value (mark-to-market accounting), in which case paper wealth changes as market prices vary.

In some cases, different measures may differ significantly – for example, one may purchase a stock for $1, and the market value may increase to $100, so the book value is $1, and the market value is $100. Conversely, one may purchase a house for $100,000, and then the housing market may fall, with the identical house next door selling for $80,000. In both these cases, book value and market value (to the extent that there is a market) differ, and which is more accurate may be debatable – one may argue that liquidation value (price obtained if sold immediately) would be a distressed sale and not reflect the potential value in a more orderly sale.

== Economic effects ==
Paper wealth is attributed as being a factor in economic cycles; in mainstream economics, this is interpreted as the wealth effect, while in some heterodox schools, it is interpreted as price bubbles.

=== Wealth effect ===
The most commonly discussed effect of paper wealth is the wealth effect: as people (households) increase in wealth, they are likely to spend more, while if their wealth decreases, they are likely to spend less. This is termed "the wealth effect" (compare income effect), and is generally attributed to psychological feelings of confidence – one feels rich, so one spends. The significance of the wealth effect is debated; it is generally procyclical, meaning that when the economy is doing well, asset prices rise, prompting consumers to spend more, which provides further stimulus to the economy and risks overheating. Conversely, if the economy is doing poorly, asset prices fall, and consumers spend less, leading to a vicious cycle and potentially a depression.

=== Price bubbles ===
Less commonly, increases in overall paper wealth are seen as signs of price bubbles – unsustainable increases in the level of prices. These are generally attributed to credit bubbles (prices are bid up with borrowed money) and are seen as a significant warning sign of a pending economic crisis; they form the central mechanism of Austrian business cycle theory and debt deflation.

These concerns are not widely shared by mainstream economics – elevated asset price levels are considered a concern, but a minor one, while private credit levels are not considered macroeconomically significant, as they are simply a matter of distribution.

Austrian economics ascribes price bubbles to excess money printing by central banks and ultimately to inflation; the resulting bursting of the price bubble and the following depression are seen as a necessary purging of the previous excesses.

In debt deflation (most associated with Post-Keynesian economics, but with some mainstream interest), price bubbles are particularly linked to excess private credit growth, especially the extension of credit by commercial banks. While the price bubble itself is neutral, people then borrow against these inflated asset prices (as via a home equity line of credit), which increases the credit bubble, and it is the elevated level of debt that is the underlying cause of the ensuing depression.

== Related distinctions ==
Assets can be distinguished as real (physical) assets, notably property, plant, and equipment (PP&E – real estate, buildings, durable equipment) and inventory (consumables), and financial assets (equity and debt in other companies).

At the household level, real assets are most commonly a home (both the land and the building), personal belongings (notably cars and other vehicles), commodities (such as gold), and collectibles (art). Financial assets most commonly include stocks and bonds (both corporate and government). The status of cash is more debatable – fiat money is formally a financial asset backed by a government, while a bank deposit is a financial asset backed by a commercial bank, which today is generally backed by a government (via deposit insurance such as the U.S. Federal Deposit Insurance Corporation). As such, the value of cash may inflate away – it is a form of paper wealth – but it is generally distinguished from stocks and bonds.

A related technical issue in economics is the aggregation problem, as debated in the Cambridge capital controversy – to what extent is it permissible and useful to aggregate different measures? Aggregating different physical and financial assets is, in some views, illegitimate or misleading, though the market value of assets can be aggregated by adding. This aggregation is generally accepted practice in economic theory, with disaggregation reserved for accounting or detailed analysis.

In accounting, tangible assets and intangible assets are distinguished. In wealth management, liquid financial assets (roughly corresponding to the common understanding of paper wealth, ignoring the value of housing) are a key metric.

== Other forms of wealth ==
Beyond real and financial assets, other valuable intangible assets, commonly referred to as "wealth", are formally classified as forms of "capital". At the individual level these are referred to as human capital, including education and social connections, while at the social level these are referred to as social capital, and include communities, social norms, and institutions; more traditionally these were referred to as "civilization", but this usage is now considered pejorative. There is also what Pierre Bourdieu calls cultural capital, the asset of knowledge and connections that university-educated people have.

== See also ==
- Fictitious capital
- Real prices and ideal prices
