= Countertrade =

Countertrade means exchanging goods or services which are paid for, in whole or in part, with other goods or services, rather than with money. A monetary valuation can however be used in countertrade for accounting purposes. In dealings between sovereign states, the term bilateral trade is used.

== Types of countertrade ==
There are six main variants of countertrade:

- Barter: Exchange of goods or services directly for other goods or services without the use of money as means of purchase or payment.

Barter is the direct exchange of goods between two parties in a transaction. The principal exports are paid for with goods or services supplied from the importing market. A single contract covers both flows, in its simplest form involves no cash. In practice, supply of the principal exports is often held up until sufficient revenues have been earned from the sale of bartered goods. One of the largest barter deals to date involved Occidental Petroleum Corporation's agreement to ship sulphuric acid to the former Soviet Union for ammonia urea and potash under a 2 year deal which was worth 18 billion euros. Furthermore, during negotiation stage of a barter deal, the seller must know the market price for items offered in trade. Bartered goods can range from hams to iron pellets, mineral water, furniture or olive-oil all somewhat more difficult to price and market when potential customers must be sought.

- Switch trading: Practice in which one company sells to another its obligation to make a purchase in a given country.
- Counterpurchase: The sale of goods and services to a company in another country by a company that promises to make a future purchase of a specific product from the same company in that country.
- Buyback: occurs when a firm builds a plant in a country, or supplies technology, equipment, training, or other services to the country, and agrees to take a certain percentage of the plant's output as partial payment for the contract.
- Offset: Agreement that a company will offset a hard-currency purchase of an unspecified product from that nation in the future. Agreement by one nation to buy a product from another, subject to the purchase of some or all of the components and raw materials from the buyer of the finished product, or the assembly of such product in the buyer nation.
- Compensation trade: Compensation trade is a form of barter in which one of the flows is partly in goods and partly in hard currency.

== Necessity ==
Countertrade also occurs when countries lack sufficient hard currency, or when other types of market trade are impossible.

In 2000, India and Iraq agreed on an "oil for wheat and rice" barter deal, subject to United Nations approval under Article 50 of the UN Persian Gulf War sanctions, that would facilitate 300,000 barrels of oil delivered daily to India at a price of $6.85 a barrel while Iraq oil sales into Asia were valued at about $22 a barrel. In 2001, India agreed to swap 1.5 million tonnes of Iraqi crude under the oil-for-food program.

The Security Council noted: "... although locally produced food items have become increasingly available throughout the country, most Iraqis do not have the necessary purchasing power to buy them. Unfortunately, the monthly food rations represent the largest proportion of their household income. They are obliged to either barter or sell items from the food basket in order to meet their other essential needs. This is one of the factors which partly explains why the nutritional situation has not improved in line with the enhanced food basket. Moreover, the absence of normal economic activity has given rise to the spread of deep-seated poverty."

== Role of countertrade in the world market ==
In the COMECON era and during transition to a market economy in the 1990s, countertrade transactions were conducted on a large scale among the former Soviet Union and its allies in the Eastern Europe and with other parts of the world. The reason that these countries allocated a big portion of their commerce to the countertrade was the lack of sufficient hard currency. A significant proportion of international commerce, possibly as much as 25%, involved the barter of products for other products, rather than for hard currency. Countertrade can range from simple barter deals between two countries to a complex web of exchanges meeting the needs of all countries involved.

Noted US economist Paul Samuelson was skeptical about the viability of countertrade as a marketing tool, claiming that "Unless a hungry tailor happens to find an undraped farmer, who has both food and a desire for a pair of pants, neither can make a trade". (This is called "double coincidence of wants".) But this is arguably too simplistic an interpretation of how markets operate in the real world. In any real economy, bartering occurs all the time, even if it is not the main means to acquire goods and services.

The volume of countertrade is growing. In 1972, it was estimated that countertrade was used by business and governments in 15 countries; in 1979, 27 countries; by the start of the 1990s, around 100 countries (Verzariu, 1992). A large part of countertrade involved sales of military equipment (weaponry, vehicles and installations).

More than 80 countries nowadays regularly use or require countertrade exchanges. Officials of the General Agreement on Tariffs and Trade (GATT) organization claimed that countertrade accounts for around 5% of the world trade. The British Department of Trade and Industry has suggested 15%, while some scholars believe it to be closer to 30%, with east-west trade having been as high as 50% in some trading sectors of Eastern European and Third World Countries for some years. A consensus of expert opinions (Okaroafo, 1989) has put the percentage of the value of world trade volumes linked to countertrade transactions at between 20% and 25%.

According to an official US statement, "The U.S. Government generally views countertrade, including barter, as contrary to an open, free trading system and, in the long run, not in the interest of the U.S. business community. However, as a matter of policy the U.S. Government will not oppose U.S. companies' participation in countertrade arrangements unless such action could have a negative impact on national security".

== Further Information ==
- Verzariu, P., (1992), "Trends and Developments in International Countertrade," Business America, (November 2), 2-6.
- Okaroafo, S., (1989) "Determinants of LDC Mandated Countertrade," International Management Review, (Winter), 1624
- Kelly, M., and McGowen, J., (2013) "BUSN 5," South - Western Cengage Learning, Mason, OH. ISBN 1111826730.
