= Mode of production =

Concept which originated in the thought of Karl Marx

In the Marxist theory of historical materialism, a mode of production (German: Produktionsweise, "the way of producing") is a specific combination of the:

- Productive forces: these include human labour power and means of production (tools, machinery, factory buildings, infrastructure, technical knowledge, raw materials, plants, animals, exploitable land).
- Social and technical relations of production: these include the property, power and control relations (legal code) governing the means of production of society, cooperative work associations, relations between people and the objects of their work, and the relations among the social classes.

Marx said that a person's productive ability and participation in social relations are two essential characteristics of social reproduction, and that the particular modality of those social relations in the capitalist mode of production is inherently in conflict with the progressive development of the productive capabilities of human beings. A precursor concept was Adam Smith's mode of subsistence, which delineated a progression of types of society based upon how the citizens of a society provided for their material needs.

== Significance of concept ==
Building on the four-stage theory of human development of the Scottish Enlightenment – Hunting/Pastoral/Agricultural/Commercial Societies, each with its own socio-cultural characteristics – Marx articulated the concept of mode of production: "The mode of production in material life determines the general character of the social, political, and spiritual processes of life."

Marx considered that the way people relate to the physical world and the way people relate to each other socially are bound up together in specific and necessary ways: "men [who] produce cloth, linen, silk...also produce the social relations amid which they prepare cloth and linen." People must consume to survive, but to consume they must produce and in producing they necessarily enter into relations which exist independently of their will.

For Marx, the whole secret of why/how a social order exists and the causes of social change must be discovered in the specific mode of production that a society has. He further argued that the mode of production substantively shaped the nature of the mode of distribution, the mode of circulation and the mode of consumption, all of which together constitute the economic sphere. To understand the way wealth was distributed and consumed, it was necessary to understand the conditions under which it was produced.

A mode of production is historically distinctive for Marx because it constitutes part of an organic totality (or self-reproducing whole) which is capable of constantly re-creating its own initial conditions and thus perpetuate itself in a more or less stable ways for centuries, or even millennia. By performing social surplus labour in a specific system of property relations, the labouring classes constantly reproduce the foundations of the social order. A mode of production normally shapes the mode of distribution, circulation and consumption and is regulated by the state. As Marx wrote to Annenkov, "Assume particular stages of development in production, commerce and consumption and you will have a corresponding social order, a corresponding organization of the family and of the ranks and classes, in a word, a corresponding civil society."

However any given mode of production will also contain within it (to a greater or lesser extent) relics of earlier modes, as well as seeds of new ones. The emergence of new productive forces will cause conflict in the current mode of production. When conflict arises, the modes of production can evolve within the current structure or cause a complete breakdown.

=== Process of socioeconomic change ===
The process by which social and economic systems evolve is based on the premise of improving technology. Specifically, as the level of technology improves, existing forms of social relations become increasingly insufficient for fully exploiting technology. This generates internal inefficiencies within the broader socioeconomic system, most notably in the form of class conflict. The obsolete social arrangements prevent further social progress while generating increasingly severe contradictions between the level of technology (forces of production) and social structure (social relations, conventions and organization of production) which develop to a point where the system can no longer sustain itself and is overthrown through internal social revolution that allows for the emergence of new forms of social relations that are compatible with the current level of technology (productive forces).

The fundamental driving force behind structural changes in the socioeconomic organization of civilization are underlying material concerns—specifically, the level of technology and extent of human knowledge and the forms of social organization they make possible. This comprises what Marx termed the materialist conception of history (see also materialism) and is in contrast to an idealist analysis, (such as that criticised by Marx in Proudhon), which states that the fundamental driving force behind socioeconomic change are the ideas of enlightened individuals.

== Modes of production ==
The main modes of production that Marx identified include primitive communism, slave society, feudalism, capitalism and communism. In each of these stages of production, people interact with nature and production in different ways. Any surplus from that production was distributed differently. Marx propounded that humanity first began living in primitive communist societies, then came the ancient societies such as Rome and Greece which were based on a ruling class of citizens and a class of slaves, then feudalism which was based on nobles and serfs, and then capitalism which is based on the capitalist class (bourgeoisie) and the working class (proletariat). In his idea of a future communist society, Marx explains that classes would no longer exist, and therefore the exploitation of one class by another is abolished.

=== Primitive communism ===
Marx and Engels often referred to the "first" mode of production as primitive communism. In classical Marxism, the two earliest modes of production were those of the tribal band or horde, and of the Neolithic kinship group. Tribal bands of hunter gatherers represented for most of human history the only form of possible existence. Technological progress in the Stone Age was very slow; social stratification was very limited (as were personal possessions, hunting grounds being held in common); and myth, ritual and magic are seen as the main cultural forms. Due to their limited means of production (hunting and gathering) each individual was only able to produce enough to sustain themselves, thus without any surplus there is nothing to exploit. This inherently makes them communist in social relations although primitive in productive forces.

=== Asiatic and tributary modes of production ===
The Asiatic mode of production is a controversial contribution to Marxist theory, first used to explain pre-slave and pre-feudal large earthwork constructions in India, the Euphrates and Nile river valleys (and named on this basis of the primary evidence coming from greater "Asia"). The Asiatic mode of production is said to be the initial form of class society, where a small group extracts social surplus through violence aimed at settled or unsettled band and village communities within a domain. It was made possible by a technological advance in data-processing – writing, cataloguing and archiving – as well as by associated advances in standardisation of weights and measures, mathematics, calendar-making and irrigation.

Exploited labour is extracted as forced corvee labour during a slack period of the year (allowing for monumental construction such as the pyramids, ziggurats and ancient Indian communal baths). Exploited labour is also extracted in the form of goods directly seized from the exploited communities. The primary property form of this mode is the direct religious possession of communities (villages, bands, and hamlets, and all those within them) by the gods: in a typical example, three-quarters of the property would be allotted to individual families, while the remaining quarter would be worked for the theocracy. The ruling class of this society is generally a semi-theocratic aristocracy which claims to be the incarnation of gods on earth. The forces of production associated with this society include basic agricultural techniques, massive construction, irrigation, and storage of goods for social benefit (granaries). Because of the unproductive use of the creamed-off surplus, such Asiatic empires tended to be doomed to fall into decay.

Marxist historians such as John Haldon and Chris Wickham have argued that societies interpreted by Marx as examples of the AMP are better understood as Tributary Modes of Production (TMP). The TMP is characterized as having a "state class" as its specific form of ruling class, which has exclusive or almost exclusive rights to extract surplus from peasants over whom, however, it does not exercise tenurial control.

=== Ancient mode of production ===
The agricultural revolution led to the development of the first civilizations. With the adoption of agriculture at the outset of the Neolithic Revolution, and accompanying technological advances in pottery, brewing, baking, and weaving, there came a modest increase in social stratification, and the birth of class with private property held in hierarchical kinship groups or clans. Animism was replaced by a new emphasis on gods of fertility. Technological advances in the form of cheap iron tools, coinage, and the alphabet, and the division of labour between industry, trade and farming, enabled new and larger units to develop in the form of the polis, which called in turn for new forms of social aggregation. A host of urban associations – formal and informal – took over from earlier familial and tribal groupings. Constitutionally agreed law replaced the vendetta - an advance celebrated in such new urban cultural forms as Greek tragedy: thus, as Robert Fagles put it, "The Oresteia is our rite of passage from savagery to civilization...from the blood vendetta to the social justice."

Ancient Greece and Rome are the most typical examples of this antique mode of production. The forces of production associated with this mode include advanced (two field) agriculture, the extensive use of animals in agriculture, industry (mining and pottery), and advanced trade networks. It is differentiated from the Asiatic mode in that property forms included the direct possession of individual human beings (slavery): thus for example Plato in his ideal city-state of Magnesia envisaged for the leisured ruling class of citizens that "their farms have been entrusted to slaves, who provide them with sufficient produce of the land to keep them in modest comfort." The ancient mode of production is also distinguished by the way the ruling class usually avoids the more outlandish claims of being the direct incarnation of a god and prefers to be the descendants of gods, or seeks other justifications for its rule, including varying degrees of popular participation in politics.

It was not so much democracy, but rather the universalising of its citizenship, that eventually enabled Rome to set up a Mediterranean-wide urbanised empire, knit together by roads, harbours, lighthouses, aqueducts, and bridges, and with engineers, architects, traders and industrialists fostering interprovincial trade between a growing set of urban centres.

=== Feudal mode of production ===
Feudalism is the third mode of production where by the major means of production was land. The fall of the Western Roman Empire returned most of Western Europe to subsistence agriculture, dotted with ghost towns and obsolete trade-routes Authority too was localised, in a world of poor roads and difficult farming conditions. The new social form which, by the ninth century, had emerged in place of the ties of family or clan, of sacred theocracy or legal citizenship was a relationship based on the personal tie of vassal to lord, cemented by the link to landholding in the guise of the fief. This was the feudal mode of production, which dominated the systems of the West between the fall of the classical world and the rise of capitalism. (Similar systems existing in most of the world as well.) This period also saw the decentralization of the ancient empires into the earliest nation-states.

The primary form of property is the possession of land in reciprocal contract relations, military service for knights, labour services to the lord of the manor by peasants or serfs tied to and entailed upon the land. Exploitation occurs through reciprocated contract (though ultimately resting on the threat of forced extractions). The ruling class is usually a nobility or aristocracy, typically legitimated by some concurrent form of theocracy. The primary forces of production include highly complex agriculture (two, three field, lucerne fallowing and manuring) with the addition of non-human and non-animal power devices (clockwork and wind-mills) and the intensification of specialisation in the crafts—craftsmen exclusively producing one specialised class of product.

The prevailing ideology was of a hierarchical system of society, tempered by the element of reciprocity and contract in the feudal tie. While, as Maitland warned, the feudal system had many variations, extending as it did over more than half a continent, and half a millennium, nevertheless the many forms all had at their core a relationship that (in the words of John Burrow) was "at once legal and social, military and economic...at once a way of organising military force, a social hierarchy, an ethos and what Marx would later call a mode of production."

During this period, a merchant class arises and grows in strength, driven by the profit motive but prevented from developing further profits by the nature of feudal society, in which, for instance, the serfs are tied to the land and cannot become industrial workers and wage-earners. This eventually precipitates an epoch of social revolution (i.e.: the English Civil War and the Glorious Revolution of 1688, the French Revolution of 1789, etc.) wherein the social and political organization of feudal society (or the property relations of feudalism) are overthrown by a nascent bourgeoisie.

=== Capitalist mode of production ===
By the close of the Middle Ages, the feudal system had been increasingly hollowed out by the growth of free towns, the commutation for money of servile labour, the replacement of the feudal host by a paid soldiery, and the divorce of retainership from land tenure – even if feudal privileges, ethics and enclaves would persist in Europe till the end of the millennium in residual forms. Feudalism was succeeded by what Smith called the Age of Commerce, and Marx the capitalist mode of production, which spans the period from mercantilism to imperialism and beyond, and is usually associated with the emergence of modern industrial society and the global market economy. Marx maintained that central to the new capitalist system was the replacement of a system of money serving as the key to commodity exchange (C-M-C, commerce), by a system of money leading (via commodities) to the re-investment of money in further production (M-C-M’, capitalism) – the new and overriding social imperative.

The primary form of property is that of private property in commodity form – land, materials, tools of production, and human labour, all being potentially commodified and open to exchange in a cash nexus by way of (state guaranteed) contract: as Marx put it, "man himself is brought into the sphere of private property". The primary form of exploitation is by way of (formally free) wage labour (see Das Kapital), with debt peonage, wage slavery, and other forms of exploitation also possible. The ruling class for Marx is the bourgeoisie, or the owners of capital who possess the means of production, who exploit the proletariat for surplus value, as the proletarians possess only their own labour power which they must sell in order to survive. Yuval Harari reconceptualised the dichotomy for the 21st Century in terms of the rich who invest to re-invest, and the remainder who go into debt in order to consume for the benefit of the owners of the means of production.

Under capitalism, the key forces of production include the overall system of modern production with its supporting structures of bureaucracy, bourgeois democracy, and above all finance capital. The system's ideological underpinnings took place over the course of time, Frederic Jameson for example considering that "the Western Enlightenment may be grasped as part of a properly bourgeois cultural revolution, in which the values and the discourse, the habits and the daily space, of the ancien régime were systematically dismantled so that in their place could be set the new conceptualities, habits and life forms, and value systems of a capitalist market society" – utilitarianism, rationalised production (Weber), training and discipline (Foucault) and a new capitalist time-structure.

=== Communist mode of production ===
==== Lower-stage of communism ====
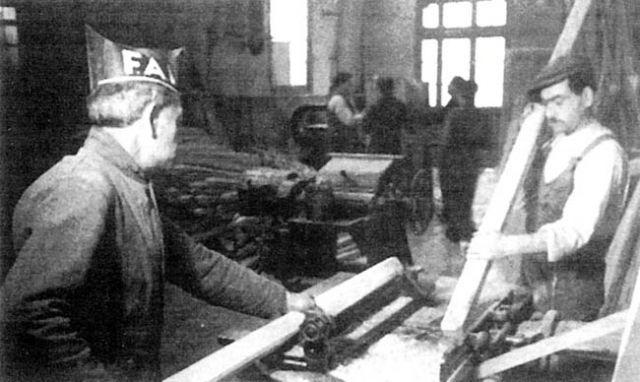
CNT-FAI worker cooperative in Barcelona producing wood and steel products

The bourgeoisie, as Marx stated in The Communist Manifesto, has "forged the weapons that bring death to itself; it has also called into existence the men who are to wield those weapons—the modern working class—the proletarians." Historical materialists henceforth believe that the modern proletariat are the new revolutionary class in relation to the bourgeoisie, in the same way that the bourgeoisie was the revolutionary class in relation to the nobility under feudalism. The proletariat, then, must seize power as the new revolutionary class in a dictatorship of the proletariat.

Between capitalist and communist society there lies the period of the revolutionary transformation of the one into the other. Corresponding to this is also a political transition period in which the state can be nothing but the revolutionary dictatorship of the proletariat.

Marx also describes a communist society developed alongside the proletarian dictatorship:

Within the co-operative society based on common ownership of the means of production, the producers do not exchange their products; just as little does the labor employed on the products appear here as the value of these products, as a material quality possessed by them, since now, in contrast to capitalist society, individual labor no longer exists in an indirect fashion but directly as a component part of total labor. The phrase "proceeds of labor", objectionable also today on account of its ambiguity, thus loses all meaning. What we have to deal with here is a communist society, not as it has developed on its own foundations, but, on the contrary, just as it emerges from capitalist society; which is thus in every respect, economically, morally, and intellectually, still stamped with the birthmarks of the old society from whose womb it emerges. Accordingly, the individual producer receives back from society—after the deductions have been made—exactly what he gives to it. What he has given to it is his individual quantum of labor. For example, the social working day consists of the sum of the individual hours of work; the individual labor time of the individual producer is the part of the social working day contributed by him, his share in it. He receives a certificate from society that he has furnished such-and-such an amount of labor (after deducting his labor for the common funds); and with this certificate, he draws from the social stock of means of consumption as much as the same amount of labor cost. The same amount of labor which he has given to society in one form, he receives back in another.

This lower-stage of communist society is, according to Marx, analogous to the lower-stage of capitalist society, i.e. the transition from feudalism to capitalism, in that both societies are "stamped with the birthmarks of the old society from whose womb it emerges." The emphasis on the idea that modes of production do not exist in isolation but rather are materialized from the previous existence is a core idea in historical materialism.

There is considerable debate among communists regarding the nature of this society. Some such as Joseph Stalin, Fidel Castro, and other Marxist–Leninists believe that the lower-stage of communism constitutes its own mode of production, which they call socialist rather than communist. Marxist–Leninists believe that this society may still maintain the concepts of property, money, and commodity production. Left communists argue that the lower-stage of communism is just that; a communist mode of production, without commodities or money, stamped with the birthmarks of capitalism. Anarchists reject a transitional state, and call for universal flat hierarchies.

==== Higher-stage of communism ====
To Marx, the higher-stage of communist society is a free association of producers which has successfully negated all remnants of capitalism, notably the concepts of states, nationality, sexism, families, alienation, social classes, money, property, commodities, the bourgeoisie, the proletariat, division of labor, cities and countryside, class struggle, religion, ideology, and markets. It is the negation of capitalism.

Marx made the following comments on the higher-phase of communist society:

In a higher phase of communist society, after the enslaving subordination of the individual to the division of labor, and therewith also the antithesis between mental and physical labor, has vanished; after labor has become not only a means of life but life's prime want; after the productive forces have also increased with the all-around development of the individual, and all the springs of co-operative wealth flow more abundantly—only then can the narrow horizon of bourgeois right be crossed in its entirety and society inscribe on its banners: From each according to his ability, to each according to his needs!

== Base and superstructure ==
Marxists such as Chris Harman, Terry Eagleton and R.J. Robinson have argued that historical models of production generally rely upon forces and relations of production that they cannot produce through their own normal means. For example, pre-modern complex societies such as ancient Rome or the Aztecs were unable to control a wide range of natural phenomena such as the weather, harvests, childbirth, and so on. Where such limited modes of production prevailed, systems of practice and then belief for persuading or bribing supernatural powers to intervene on humanity's behalf developed – i.e., religions. Similarly, industrial societies require a large supply of skilled and disciplined workers, but these cannot be created through the ordinary mechanisms of capitalism (i.e., producing and selling commodities).

This gives rise to the Marxist paradigm of 'Base and superstructure', in which such shortcomings in the underlying mode of production (the 'base') are managed through 'relatively autonomous' systems ('superstructures').

== See also ==
- Base and superstructure
- Bureaucratic collectivism
- Capitalist mode of production
- Crisis (Marxian)
- Division of labour
- Critique of political economy
- Means of production
- Relations of production
- Socialist mode of production
- Social system
