= Capitalist mode of production =

Systems of organizing production and distribution within capitalist societies

In Karl Marx's critique of political economy and subsequent Marxian analyses, the capitalist mode of production (German: Produktionsweise) refers to the systems of organizing production and distribution within capitalist societies. Private money-making in various forms (renting, banking, merchant trade, production for profit and so on) preceded the development of the capitalist mode of production as such. The capitalist mode of production proper, based on wage-labour and private ownership of the means of production and on industrial technology, began to grow rapidly in Western Europe from the Industrial Revolution, later extending to most of the world.

The capitalist mode of production is characterized by private ownership of the means of production, extraction of surplus value by the owning class for the purpose of capital accumulation, wage-based labour and—at least as far as commodities are concerned—being market-based.

== Synopsis ==
A "mode of production" (German: Produktionsweise) means simply "the distinctive way of producing", which could be defined in terms of how it is socially organized and what kinds of technologies and tools are used. Under the capitalist mode of production:

- Both the inputs and outputs of production are privately owned, priced goods and services purchased in the market.
- Production is carried out for exchange and circulation in the market, aiming to obtain a net profit income from it.
- The owners of the means of production (capitalists) constitute the dominant class (bourgeoisie) who derive its income from the exploitation of the surplus value. Surplus value is a term within the Marxian theory which reveals the workers' unpaid work.
- A defining feature of capitalism is the dependency on wage-labor for a large segment of the population; specifically, the working class, that is a segment of the proletariat, which does not own means of production (type of capital) and are compelled to sell to the owners of the means of production their labour power in order to produce and thus have an income to provide for themselves and their families the necessities of life.

The capitalist mode of production may exist within societies with differing political systems (e.g. liberal democracy, social democracy, fascism, Communist state and Czarism) and alongside different social structures such as tribalism, the caste system, an agrarian-based peasant society, urban industrial society and post-industrialism. Although capitalism has existed in the form of merchant activity, banking, renting land and small-scale manufactures in previous stages of history, it was usually a relatively minor activity and secondary to the dominant forms of social organization and production with the prevailing property system keeping commerce within clear limits.

== Distinguishing characteristics ==
Capitalist society is epitomized by the so-called circuit of commodity production, M-C-M' and by renting money for that purpose where the aggregate of market actors determine the money price M, of the input labor and commodities and M' the struck price of C, the produced market commodity. It is centered on the process M → M', "making money" and the exchange of value that occurs at that point. M' > M is the condition of rationality in the capitalist system and a necessary condition for the next cycle of accumulation/production. For this reason, Capitalism is "production for exchange" driven by the desire for personal accumulation of money receipts in such exchanges, mediated by free markets. The markets themselves are driven by the needs and wants of consumers and those of society as a whole in the form of the bourgeois state. These wants and needs would (in the socialist or communist society envisioned by Marx, Engels and others) be the driving force; this would be "production for use". Contemporary mainstream (bourgeois) economics, particularly that associated with the right, holds that an "invisible hand", through little more than the freedom of the market, is able to match social production to these needs and desires.

"Capitalism" as this money-making activity has existed in the shape of merchants and money-lenders who acted as intermediaries between consumers and producers engaging in simple commodity production (hence the reference to "merchant capitalism") since the beginnings of civilization. What is specific about the “capitalist mode of production” is that most of the inputs and outputs of production are supplied through the market (i.e. they are commodities) and essentially all production is in this mode. For example, in flourishing feudalism most or all of the factors of production including labor are owned by the feudal ruling class outright and the products may also be consumed without a market of any kind, it is production for use within the feudal social unit and for limited trade.

This has the important consequence that the whole organization of the production process is reshaped and reorganized to conform with economic rationality as bounded by capitalism, which is expressed in price relationships between inputs and outputs (wages, non-labor factor costs, sales, profits) rather than the larger rational context faced by society overall. That is, the whole process is organized and reshaped in order to conform to "commercial logic". Another way of saying this is that capital accumulation defines economic rationality in capitalist production. In the flourishing period of capitalism, these are not operating at cross purposes and thus capitalism acts as a progressive force (e.g. against feudalism). In the final stages, capitalism as a mode of production achieves complete domination on a planetary basis and has nothing to overcome but itself, the final (for it, capitalism, viewed as a Hegelian process, not for historical development per se) negating of the negation posited by orthodox Marxism.

In this context, Marx refers to a transition from the “formal subsumption”, the formal turning of workers into wage-laborers, to the “real subsumption” of production under the power of capital. In what he calls the "specifically capitalist mode of production", both the technology worked with and the social organization of labour have been completely refashioned and reshaped in a commercial (profit and market-oriented) way—the "old ways of producing" (for example, crafts and cottage industries) had been completely displaced by the then new industrialism. Some historians, such as Jairus Banaji and Nicholas Vrousalis have argued that capitalist relations of production predate the capitalist mode of production.

=== Summary of basic distinctions ===
In general, capitalism as an economic system and mode of production can be summarized by the following:

- Capital accumulation: production for profit and accumulation as the implicit purpose of all or most of production, constriction or elimination of production formerly carried out on a common social or private household basis.
- Commodity production: production for exchange on a market; to maximize exchange-value instead of use-value.
- Private ownership of the means of production: ownership of the means of production by a class of capital owners, either individually, collectively (see corporation) or through a state that serves the interests of the capitalist class (see state capitalism).
- Primacy of wage labor: near universality of wage labor, whether so-called or not, with coerced work for the masses in excess of what they would need to sustain themselves and a complete saturation of bourgeois values at all levels of society from the base reshaping and reorganization described above.

== Origins ==
Marx argued that capital existed incipiently on a small scale for centuries in the form of merchant, renting and lending activities and occasionally also as small-scale industry with some wage labour (Marx was also well aware that wage labour existed for centuries on a modest scale before the advent of capitalist industry). Simple commodity exchange and consequently simple commodity production, which form the initial basis for the growth of capital from trade, have a very long history. The "capitalistic era" according to Marx dates from the 16th century, i.e. it began with merchant capitalism and relatively small urban workshops.

For the capitalist mode of production to emerge as a distinctive mode of production dominating the whole production process of society, many different social, economic, cultural, technical and legal-political conditions had to come together.

For most of human history, these did not come together. Capital existed and commercial trade existed, but it did not lead to industrialisation and large-scale capitalist industry. That required a whole series of new conditions, namely specific technologies of mass production, the ability to independently and privately own and trade in means of production, a class of workers compelled to sell their labor power for a living, a legal framework promoting commerce, a physical infrastructure making the circulation of goods on a large scale possible, security for private accumulation and so on. In many Third World countries, many of these conditions do not exist even today even though there is plenty of capital and labour available—the obstacles for the development of capitalist markets are less a technical matter and more a social, cultural and political problem.

A society, a region or nation is “capitalist” if the predominant source of incomes and products being distributed is capitalist activity—even so, this does not yet mean necessarily that the capitalist mode of production is dominant in that society.

== Defining structural criteria ==
Marx never provided a complete definition of the capitalist mode of production as a short summary, although in his manuscripts he sometimes attempted one.

In a sense, it is Marx's three-volume work Capital (1867–1894; sometimes known by its German title, Das Kapital), as a whole that provides his "definition" of the capitalist mode of production. Nevertheless, it is possible to summarise the essential defining characteristics of the capitalist mode of production as follows:

- The means of production (or capital goods) and the means of consumption (or consumer goods) are mainly produced for market sale; output is produced with the intention of sale in an open market; and only through sale of output can the owner of capital claim part of the surplus-product of human labour and realize profits. Equally, the inputs of production are supplied through the market as commodities. The prices of both inputs and outputs are mainly governed by the market laws of supply and demand (and ultimately by the law of value). In short, a capitalist must use money to fuel both the means of production and labor in order to make commodities. These commodities are then sold to the market for a profit. The profit once again becomes part of a larger amount of capital which the capitalist reinvests to make more commodities and ultimately more and more capital.
- Private ownership of the means of production ("private enterprise") as effective private control and/or legally enforced ownership, with the consequence that investment and management decisions are made by private owners of capital who act autonomously from each other and—because of business secrecy and the constraints of competition—do not co-ordinate their activities according to collective, conscious planning. Enterprises are able to set their own output prices within the framework of the forces of supply and demand manifested through the market and the development of production technology is guided by profitability criteria.
- The corollary of that is wage labour ("employment") by the direct producers, who are compelled to sell their labour power because they lack access to alternative means of subsistence (other than being self-employed or employers of labour, if only they could acquire sufficient funds) and can obtain means of consumption only through market transactions. These wage earners are mostly "free" in a double sense: they are “freed” from ownership of productive assets and they are free to choose their employer.
- Being carried out for market on the basis of a proliferation of fragmented decision-making processes by owners and managers of private capital, social production is mediated by competition for asset-ownership, political or economic influence, costs, sales, prices and profits. Competition occurs between owners of capital for profits, assets and markets; between owners of capital and workers over wages and conditions; and between workers themselves over employment opportunities and civil rights.
- The overall aim of capitalist production under competitive pressure is (a) to maximise net profit income (or realise a net superprofit) as much as possible through cutting production costs, increasing sales and monopolisation of markets and supply; (b) capital accumulation, to acquire productive and non-productive assets; and (c) to privatize both the supply of goods and services and their consumption. The larger portion of the surplus product of labor must usually be reinvested in production since output growth and accumulation of capital mutually depend on each other.
- Out of preceding characteristics of the capitalist mode of production, the basic class structure of this mode of production society emerges: a class of owners and managers of private capital assets in industries and on the land, a class of wage and salary earners, a permanent reserve army of labour consisting of unemployed people and various intermediate classes such as the self-employed (small business and farmers) and the “new middle classes” (educated or skilled professionals on higher salaries).
- The finance of the capitalist state is heavily dependent on levying taxes from the population and on credit—that is, the capitalist state normally lacks any autonomous economic basis (such as state-owned industries or landholdings) that would guarantee sufficient income to sustain state activities. The capitalist state defines a legal framework for commerce, civil society and politics, which specifies public and private rights and duties as well as legitimate property relations.
- Capitalist development, occurring on private initiative in a socially unco-ordinated and unplanned way, features periodic crises of over-production (or excess capacity). This means that a critical fraction of output cannot be sold at all, or cannot be sold at prices realising the previously ruling rate of profit. The other side of over-production is the over-accumulation of productive capital: more capital is invested in production than can obtain a normal profit. The consequence is a recession (a reduced economic growth rate) or in severe cases, a depression (negative real growth, i.e. an absolute decline in output). As a corollary, mass unemployment occurs. In the history of capitalist development since 1820, there have been more than 20 of such crises—nowadays the under-utilisation of installed productive capacity is a permanent characteristic of capitalist production (average capacity utilisation rates nowadays normally range from about 60% to 85%).

In examining particular manifestations of the capitalist mode of production in particular regions and epochs, it is possible to find exceptions to these main defining criteria, but the exceptions prove the rule in the sense that over time the exceptional circumstances tend to disappear.

== State capitalist interpretation ==
As mentioned, Marx never explicitly summarised his definition of capitalism, beyond some suggestive comments in manuscripts which he did not publish himself. This has led to controversies among Marxists about how to evaluate the "capitalist" nature of society in particular countries. Supporters of theories of state capitalism such as the International Socialists reject the definition of the capitalist mode of production given above. In their view, claimed to be more revolutionary (in that true liberation from capitalism must be the self-emancipation of the working class—"socialism from below"), what really defines the capitalist mode of production is:

- Means of production which dominate the direct producers as an alien power.
- Generalized commodity production
- The existence of a wage-earning working class which does not hold or have power.
- The existence of an elite or ruling class which controls the country, exploiting the working population in the technical Marxist sense.

This idea is based on passages from Marx, where Marx emphasized that capital cannot exist except within a power-relationship between social classes which governs the extraction of surplus-labour.

== Heterodox views and polemics ==
Orthodox Marxist debate after 1917 has often been based on the experience of Russian, East European, Vietnamese, Korean and Chinese dissidents seeking to analyze their own country independently, who were typically silenced in one way or another by the regime in which they lived. Therefore the political analysis from a Western point of view has been ideological, rather than being based directly on the experiences of people living in "actually existing socialist countries". That debate has typically counterposed a socialist ideal to a poorly understood reality, i.e. using analysis which due to such party stultification and shortcomings of the various parties fails to apply the full rigor of the dialectical method to a well informed understanding of such actual conditions in situ and falls back on trite party approved formulae. In turn, this has led to the accusation that Marxists cannot satisfactorily specify what capitalism and socialism really are, nor how to get from one to the other—quite apart from failing to explain satisfactorily why socialist revolutions failed to produce the desirable kind of socialism. Behind this problem, it is argued the following:

- A kind of historicism according to which Marxists have a privileged insight into the "march of history"—the doctrine is thought to provide the truth, in advance of real research and experience. Evidence contrary to the doctrine is rejected or overlooked.
- A uni-linear view of history, according to which feudalism leads to capitalism and capitalism to socialism.
- An attempt to fit the histories of different societies into this schema of history on the basis that if they are not socialist, they must be capitalist (or vice versa), or if they are neither, that they must be in transition from one to the other.

None of these stratagems, it is argued, are either warranted by the facts or scientifically sound and the result is that many socialists have abandoned the rigid constraints of Marxist orthodoxy in order to analyse capitalist and non-capitalist societies in a new way.

From an orthodox Marxist perspective, the former is simple ignorance and or purposeful obfuscation of works such as Jean-Paul Sartre's Critique of Dialectical Reason and a broader literature which does in fact supply such specifications. The latter are partly superficial complaints which can easily be refuted as they are diametrically opposite of well known statements by Marx, Lenin, Trotsky and others, part pettifogging and redundant restatement of the same thing and partly true observations of inferior and simplistic presentations of Marxist thought (by those espousing some brand of Marxism). Neither historical or dialectical materialism assert or imply a "uni-linear" view of human development, although Marxism does claim a general and indeed accelerating secular trend of advancement, driven in the modern period by capitalism. Similarly, Marxists, especially in the period after 1917, have on the contrary been especially mindful of the so-called unequal and uneven development and its importance in the struggle to achieve socialism. Finally, in the wake of the disasters of socialism in the previous century most modern Marxists are at great pains to stipulate that only the independently acting working class can determine the nature of the society it creates for itself so the call for a prescriptive description of exactly what that society would be like and how it is to emerge from the existing class-ridden one, other than by the conscious struggle of the masses, is an unwitting expression of precisely the problem that is supposed to be being addressed (the imposition of social structure by elites).

== See also ==
- Base and superstructure
- Heroic capitalism
- History of capitalism
- Immiseration thesis
- Marxian economics
- Natural capitalism
- Perspectives on capitalism by school of thought
- Primitive accumulation of capital
- Relations of production
- Socialist mode of production
- State monopoly capitalism
- Surplus labour
- Types of capitalism
- Critique of political economy
