= A Critique of Soviet Economics =

Chinese-language book by Mao Zedong, written 1959 and published 1967

A Critique of Soviet Economics is a work of Marxist–Leninist political economy written by Mao Zedong. It includes a critique of two Soviet works: Economic Problems of Socialism in the USSR, a short 1951 work by Soviet leader Joseph Stalin; and Political Economy: A Textbook, an official publication of Institute of Economics of the Academy of Sciences of the Soviet Union published in 1957. First published in 1967, the book is regarded as an early polemic of the Sino-Soviet split which emerged in the late 1950s and the 1960s.

== History ==
From 1958 to 1960, Mao Zedong organized a reading group, reading Political Economy: A Textbook, leaving notes and talks. The conversation was recorded by Deng Liqun. The content was first published in 1967, which was included in the Long Live Mao Zedong Thought. by which time the Sino-Soviet split had fully erupted.

The book was reissued in English translation in the name A Critique of Soviet Economics by the Monthly Review Press in 1977.

In 1995, Deng Liqun, after six systematic collations, made the Transcript of Talks on Reading the Political Economy: A Textbook of Soviet, and in 1998, the State Historical Society of the People's Republic of China published Mao Zedong's Notes and Talks on Reading Socialist Political Economy (Chinese: 毛泽东读社会主义政治经济学批注和谈话) under the name of study materials for state historical research, of which Deng Liqun's Transcript is the main part. In 2000, the State Historical Society published a short version of the book in two volumes.

== Content ==
In A Critique of Soviet Economics, Chinese leader Mao criticizes the economic views of Soviet leader Joseph Stalin, arguing that the Soviet Union's collectivization of agriculture by means of state expropriation represented a "rightist deviation" by substituting the action of the state in place of the grass-roots action of the peasant masses. Mao additionally criticized Soviet economists for making the assumption that socialist industrialization was a necessary precondition for the collectivization of agriculture and consequently over-prioritizing the development of heavy industry in an unbalanced way.

Mao also challenged the division between people's democracy and Soviet democracy.
