= Fictitious capital =

Marxist doctrine

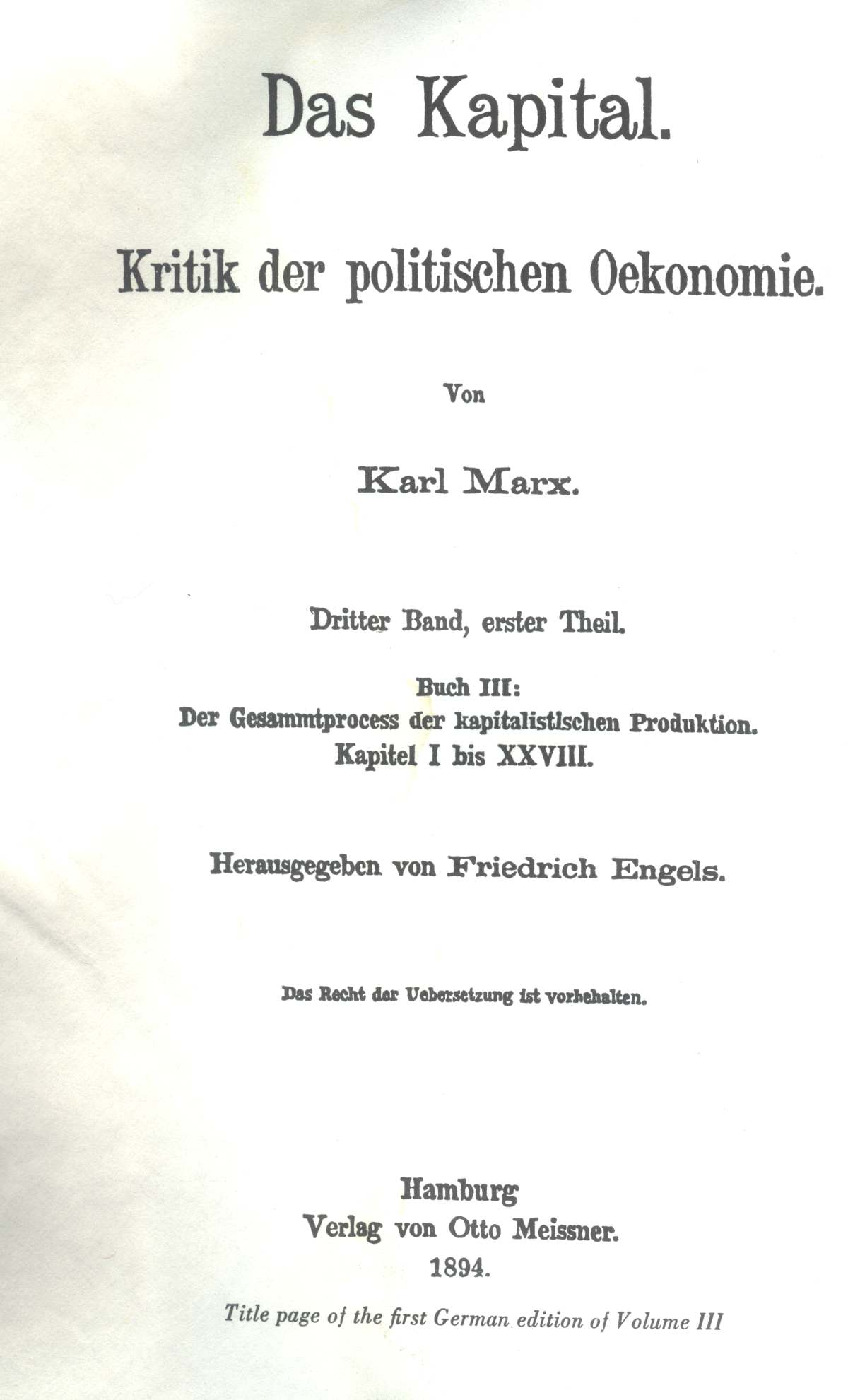
Capital, Volume III

Fictitious capital (German: fiktives Kapital) is a concept used by Karl Marx in his critique of political economy. It is introduced in chapter 25 of the third volume of Capital. Fictitious capital contrasts with what Marx calls "real capital", which is capital actually invested in physical means of production and workers, and "money capital", which is actual funds being held. The market value of fictitious capital assets (such as stocks and securities) varies according to the expected return or yield of those assets in the future, which Marx felt was only indirectly related to the growth of real production. Effectively, fictitious capital represents "accumulated claims, legal titles, to future production" and more specifically claims to the income generated by that production.

- Fictitious capital could be defined as a capitalisation on property ownership. Such ownership is real and legally enforced, as are the profits made from it, but the capital involved is fictitious; it is "money that is thrown into circulation as capital without any material basis in commodities or productive activity".
- Fictitious capital could also be defined as "tradeable paper claims to wealth", although tangible assets may themselves under certain conditions also be vastly inflated in price.

In terms of mainstream financial economics, fictitious capital is the net present value of expected future cash flows.

== Uses of the term ==
Marx saw the origin of fictitious capital in the development of the credit system and the joint-stock system.

"The formation of a fictitious capital is called capitalisation." It represents a claim to property rights or income. Such claims can take many forms, for example, a claim on future government tax revenue or a claim issued against a commodity that remains, as yet, unsold. The stocks, shares and bonds issued by companies and traded on stock markets are also fictitious capital.

A company may raise (non-fictitious) capital by issuing stocks, shares and bonds. This capital may then be used to generate surplus value, but once this capital is set in motion, the claims held by the owners of the share certificate, etc., are simply "marketable claims to a share in future surplus value production". The stock market "is a market for fictitious capital. It is a market for the circulation of property rights as such".

Since the value of these claims does not function as capital, is merely a claim on future surplus, "the capital-value of such paper is...wholly illusory... The paper serves as title of ownership which represents this capital.

The stocks of railways, mines, navigation companies, and the like, represent actual capital, namely, the capital invested and functioning in such enterprises, or the amount of money advanced by the stockholders for the purpose of being used as capital in such enterprises...; but this capital does not exist twice, once as the capital-value of titles of ownership (stocks) on the one hand and on the other hand as the actual capital invested, or to be invested, in those enterprises." The capital "exists only in the latter form", while the stock or share "is merely a title of ownership to a corresponding portion of the surplus-value to be realised by it".

The formation of fictitious capital is, for Marx, linked to the wider contradiction between the financial system in capitalism and its monetary basis. Marx writes: "With the development of interest-bearing capital and the credit system, all capital seems to double itself, and sometimes treble itself, by the various modes in which the same capital, or perhaps even the same claim on a debt, appears in different forms in different hands. The greater portion of this 'money-capital' is purely fictitious. All the deposits, with the exception of the reserve fund, are merely claims on the banker, which, however, never exist as deposits." The expansion of the credit system can, in periods of capitalist expansion, be beneficial for the system; but in periods of economic crisis and uncertainty, capitalists tend, Marx argues, to look to the security of the "money-commodity" (gold) as the ultimate measure of value. Marx tends to assume the convertibility of paper money into gold. However, the modern system of inconvertible paper money, backed by the authority of states, poses greater problems. Here, in periods of crisis, "the capitalist class appears to have a choice between devaluing money or commodities, between inflation or depression. In the event that monetary policy is dedicated to avoiding both, it will merely end up incurring both".

The term is also used by the economist Cédric Durand as the title of a 2017 book, Fictitious Capital: How Finance Is Appropriating Our Future. The book argues government intervention allows fictitious capital to "assume proportions incompatible with the real production potential of economies," leading inevitably to crises such as the Great Recession.

== Speculation ==
Profit can be made purely from trading in a variety of financial claims existing only on paper. This is an extreme form of the fetishism of commodities in which the underlying source of surplus-value in exploitation of labour power is disguised. Indeed, profit can be made by using only borrowed capital to engage in (speculative) trade, not backed up by any tangible asset.

The price of fictitious capital is governed by a series of complex determinants. In the first instance they are governed by the "present and anticipated future incomes to which ownership entitles the holder, capitalised at the going rate of interest". But fictitious capital is also the object of speculation. The market value of such assets can be driven up and artificially inflated, purely as a result of supply and demand factors which can themselves be manipulated for profit. The inflated value can just as rapidly be punctured if large amounts of capital are withdrawn.

== Illustrations ==
=== Banking ===
Marx cites the case of a Mr Chapman who testified before the British Bank Acts Committee in 1857:

"though in 1857 he was himself still a magnate on the money market, [Chapman] complained bitterly that there were several large money capitalists in London who were strong enough to bring the entire money market into disorder at a given moment and in this way fleece the smaller money dealers most shamelessly. There were supposed to be several great sharks of this kind who could significantly intensify a difficult situation by selling one or two million pounds worth of Consols and in this way taking an equivalent sum of banknotes (and thereby available loan capital) out of the market. The collaboration of three big banks in such a manoeuvre would suffice to turn a pressure into a panic."

Marx added that:

"The biggest capital power in London is of course the Bank of England, but its position as a semi-state institution makes it impossible for it to assert its domination in so brutal a fashion. Nonetheless, it too is sufficiently capable of looking after itself... Inasmuch as the Bank issues notes that are not backed by the metal reserve in its vaults, it creates tokens of value that are not only means of circulation, but also forms additional - even if fictitious - capital for it, to the nominal value of these fiduciary notes, and this extra capital yields it an extra profit."

=== Public stocks ===
Marx writes:

"To the extent that the depreciation or increase in value of this paper is independent of the movement of value of the actual capital that it represents, the wealth of the nation is just as great before as after its depreciation or increase in value.

"The public stocks and canal and railway shares had already by the 23rd of October, 1847, been depreciated in the aggregate to the amount of £114,752,225." (Morris, Governor of the Bank of England, testimony in the Report on Commercial Distress, 1847-48 [No. 3800].)

"Unless this depreciation reflected an actual stoppage of production and of traffic on canals and railways, or a suspension of already initiated enterprises, or squandering capital in positively worthless ventures, the nation did not grow one cent poorer by the bursting of this soap bubble of nominal money-capital."

== See also ==
- Capital (economics)
- Capital accumulation
- Economic bubble
- Money creation
- Speculation
- Stock market bubble
- Non-fungible token
