= Kiyama =

Kiyama may refer to:

- Kiyama, Saga, a town in Miyaki District, Saga Prefecture, Japan
- Kiyama (surname), a Japanese surname
- Kiyama (Kagawa), a castle ruin in Kagawa Prefecture, Japan
- Kiyama Station (disambiguation), multiple train stations in Japan
- Kiyama Island, an island of the Amami Islands, Japan
