= Lee Dong-hwan =

- Hangul: 이동환
- RR: I Donghwan
- MR: I Tonghwan

Lee Dong-hwan may refer to:

- Lee Dong-hwan (diplomat) (1916–1991), Korean diplomat and businessman
- Lee Dong-hwan (politician) (born 1966), South Korean politician
- Lee Dong-hwan (pastor) (born 1980-1981), South Korean pastor
- Lee Dong-hwan (golfer) (born 1987), South Korean golfer
