= Hitotsubashi University =

National university in Tokyo, Japan

Coordinates: 35.69374°N 139.44509°E

- 一橋大学
- Motto: Captains of Industry
- Type: Public (National)
- Established: 1920 (Origins 1875)
- President: Satoshi Nakano
- Faculty: 303 full-time (May 2021)
- Undergraduates: 4,364 (May 2021)
- Postgraduates: 1,923 (May 2021)
- Location: Kunitachi, Tokyo, Japan
- Campus: Urban
- Colors: Crimson Red (DIC-2489)
- Mascot: None
- Website: www.hit-u.ac.jp

Hitotsubashi University (一橋大学, Hitotsubashi daigaku), formerly known as Tokyo University of Commerce (東京商科大学, Tokyo shōka daigaku), is a public research university in Tokyo, Japan. The university has campuses in Kunitachi, Kodaira, and Chiyoda.

In 1920, Hitotsubashi was granted university status as Tokyo University of Commerce, becoming Japan’s first national college specialising in commercial studies. It underwent another name change in 1949, adopting its modern name, Hitotsubashi. In 1962, the legal name was formally changed to Hitotsubashi University.

The university specialises in the study of the social sciences, particularly commerce, economics, law, political science, sociology, social data science, and the humanities. The university has produced numerous senior bureaucrats and politicians for the Japanese government, including Masayoshi Ōhira, who served as the prime minister of Japan.

== History ==
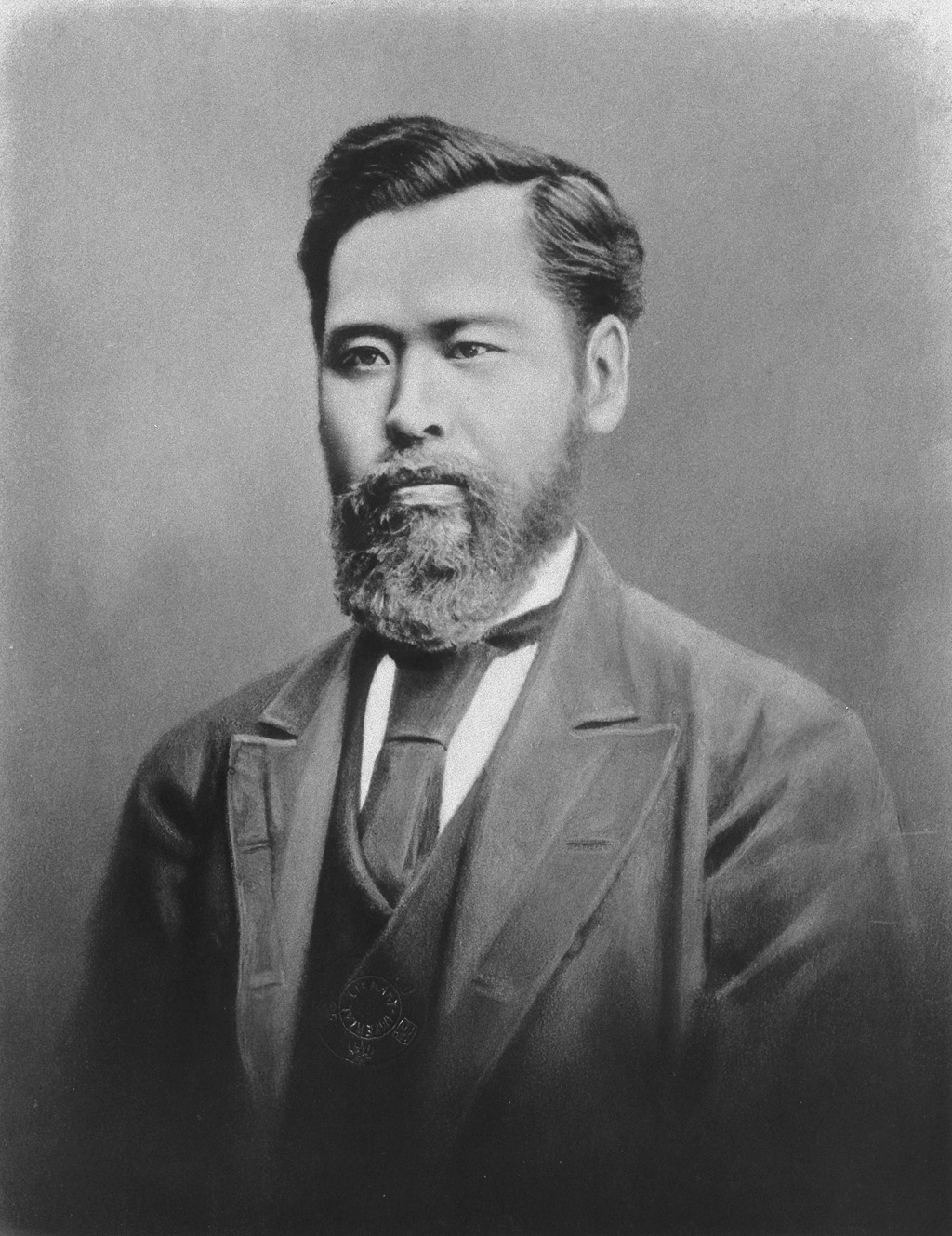
Arinori Mori, founder of Hitotsubashi

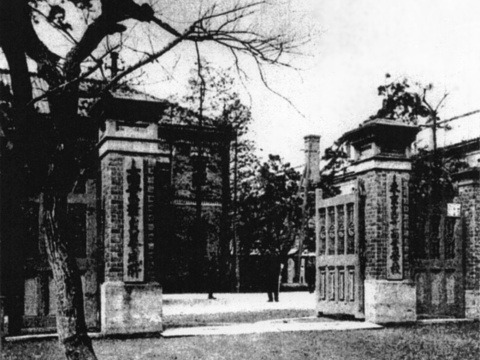
Tokyo Higher Commercial School in 1910

Founded by Arinori Mori in 1875, Hitotsubashi was initially called the Institute for Business Training (商法講習所, Shōhō Kōshujo). Eiichi Shibusawa was sent to Europe in the 1860s with a scholarship from the Tokugawa shogunate, which was then led by the 15th shogun, Yoshinobu Tokugawa. During his time in Europe, Shibusawa studied European banking and economic systems, which he later brought back to Japan. The school's growth was supported by Shibusawa, Takashi Masuda, and other prominent business figures. The renaming of the school to Hitotsubashi University in 1949 may be linked to its historical ties with the Hitotsubashi branch of the Tokugawa family, headed by Yoshinobu. There were plans to merge the institute into the University of Tokyo as part of the economics department in the 1900s, but alumni and students objected—the merger was not fulfilled. This is known as the "Shinyu Incident".

- 1875: Arinori Mori established Institute for Business Training (商法講習所, Shōhō Kōshūjo) at Ginza-owarichō, Tokyo
- 1884: became a national school under the direct supervision of the Ministry of Agriculture and Commerce of Japan, and changed its name to the Tokyo Commercial School (東京商業学校, Tokyo Shōgyō Gakkō)
- 1885: came under the control of the Ministry of Education, and absorbed the Tokyo Foreign Language School. The school then relocated to the site of the latter institution in Hitotsubashi, Tokyo in the vicinity of the Imperial Palace
- 1887: the status of the Tokyo Commercial School was raised to that of the Higher Commercial School (高等商業学校, Kōtō Shōgyō Gakkō)
- 1897: established affiliated institutions for foreign-language education
- 1899: separated affiliated institutions for foreign-language education as Tokyo School of Foreign Languages (now Tokyo University of Foreign Studies)
- 1902: changed its name to the Tokyo Higher Commercial School (東京高等商業学校, Tōkyō Kōtō Shōgyō Gakkō) due to the establishment of another such school in Kansai district (now Kobe University)
- 1920: raised to and became the Tokyo University of Commerce (東京商科大学, Tōkyō Shōka Daigaku) which is the first university specialised in commerce in Japan
- 1927: moved to Kunitachi and Kodaira, Tokyo, its present location, on account of the Great Kanto earthquake
- 1944: changed its name to the Tokyo University of Industry (東京産業大学, Tōkyō Sangyō Daigaku) under the order of the Ministry of Education, Science and Culture of Japan
- 1947: changed its name back to the Tokyo University of Commerce (東京商科大学, Tōkyō Shōka Daigaku)
- 1949: adopted the new system and the name of Hitotsubashi University (一橋大学, Hitotsubashi Daigaku) through a student ballot, when the American education system was introduced as part of the postwar education reforms, and established Faculties of Commerce, Economics, and Law & Social Sciences
- 1951: separated Faculty of Law & Social Sciences into Faculty of Law and Faculty of Social Science.
- 1962: changed Tokyo University of Commerce's legal name to Hitotsubashi University
- 1996: established the Graduate School of Language and Society
- 1998: established the Graduate School of International Corporate Strategy (ICS) which is now part of Hitotsubashi Business School (HUB)
- 2004: corporatized in 2004 as a National University Corporation. Established Law School due to the introduction of Law School system in Japan
- 2005: established School of International and Public Policy
- 2018: established Hitotsubashi University Business School (HUB) which includes ICS (SBA)
- 2019: selected as a "Designated National University"
- 2023: established School of Social Data Science & Graduate School of Social Data Science

== Organisation ==
=== Faculties and graduate schools ===
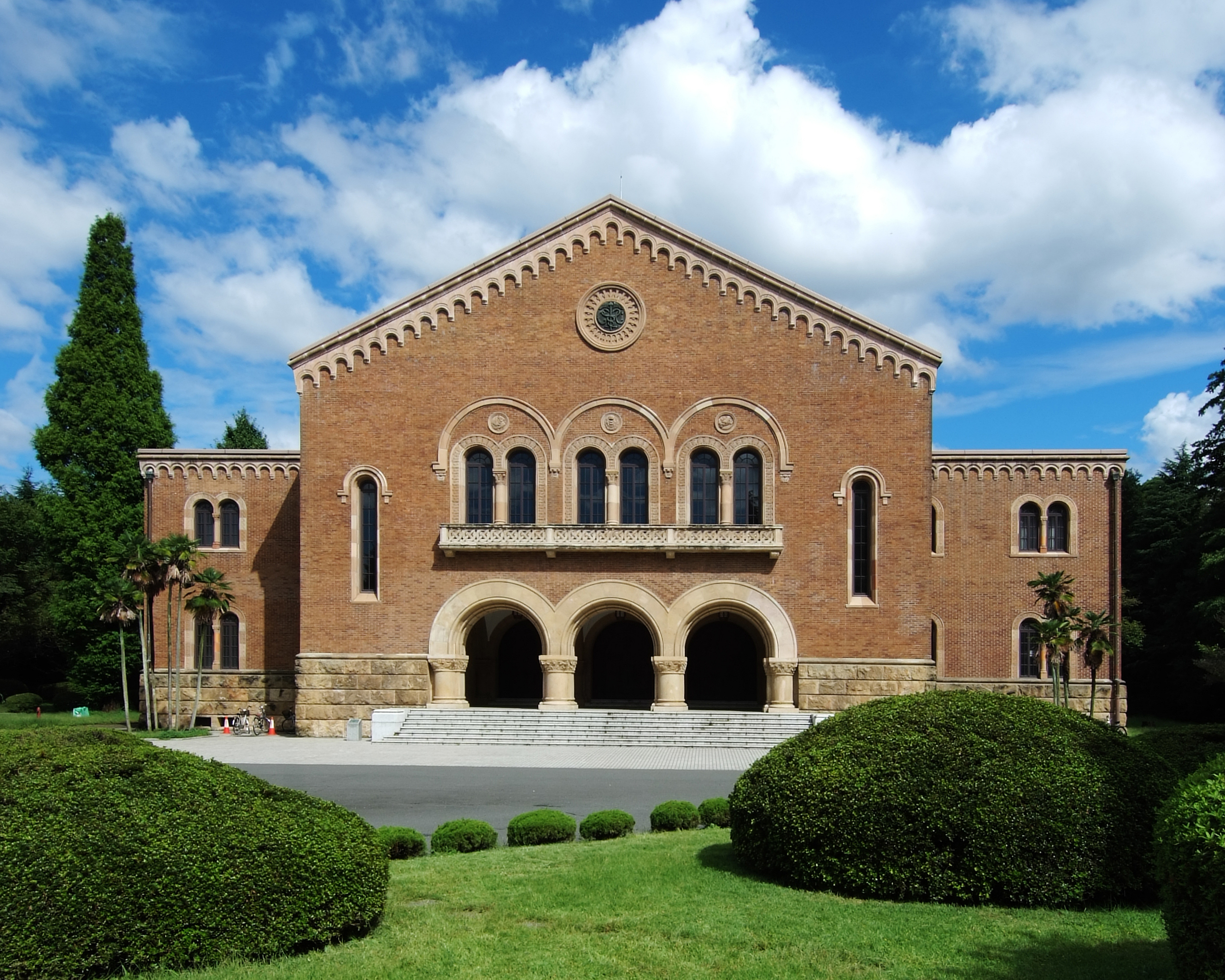
Kanematsu auditorium on the Kunitachi Campus

Hitotsubashi University has about 4,500 undergraduate and 2,100 postgraduate students with some 630 faculty members.

==== Undergraduate programs ====
- Commerce (275)
- Economics (275)
- Law (175)
- Social Sciences (235)

==== Graduate programs ====
- Commerce (Master Program: 108, Doctor Program: 30)
- Economics (Master Program: 70, Doctor Program: 30)
- Law (Master Program: 15, Doctor Program: 26 Juris Doctor Program: 100)
- Social Sciences (Master Program: 87, Doctor Program: 44)
- Language and Society (Master Program: 49, Doctor Program: 21)
- International Corporate Strategy (ICS) (including MBA Program)
- International and Public Policy (55)

Parentheses show the numbers of admitted students per year.

=== Research institutes and centers ===
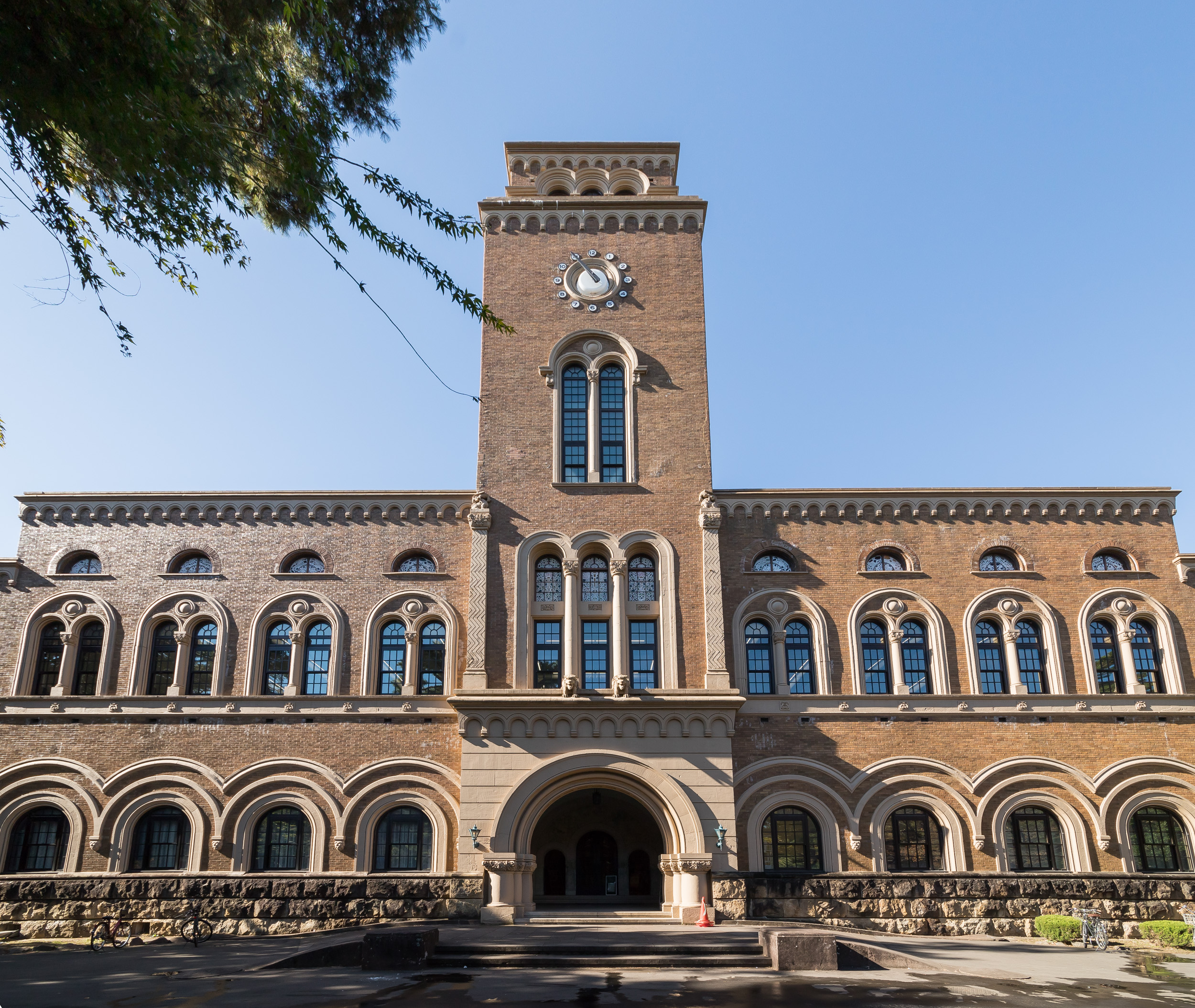
Library on the Kunitachi Campus

- Institute of Economic Research
  - Research Center for Information and Statistics of Social Science
  - Center for Economic Institutions
  - Center for Intergenerational Studies
- Research and Development Center for Higher Education
- Information and Communication Technology Center
- Center for Student Exchange
- International Joint Research Center
- Institute of Innovation Research
- Center for Historical Social Science Literature

=== Academic exchange agreements overseas ===
As of 2007, Hitotsubashi University had academic exchange agreements with 84 overseas universities and research institutions, including those between departments and departments, as follows:

== Academic rankings and reputation ==
University rankings
Global
QS	General	=553

Regional
QS Asia (Asia version)	General	143

National

Program rankings
Social Sciences & Humanities

LAW
Asahi National	Research	7

Hitotsubashi University is considered one of the most prestigious universities in Japan, consistently ranking amongst the top universities in Japanese university rankings. It is one of the highest ranked national universities that is not one of the National Seven Universities.

=== General rankings ===
The THE World University Rankings ranked the university in the 1201st-1500th tier worldwide in 2024. The university is ranked 539th worldwide in the QS World University Rankings 2025, with particularly high evaluations in economics and business management.

=== Research performance ===
The economics department especially has a high research standard. According to the Asahi Shimbun, Hitotsubashi was ranked 4th in Japan in economic research during 2005–2009. More recently, Repec in January 2011 ranked Hitotsubashi's Economic Department as Japan's 5th best economic research university. Currently three researchers in Hitotsubashi are listed as top 10% economists in its world economist rankings. Hitotsubashi has provided seven presidents of the Japanese Economic Association in its 42-year history; this number is the second largest.

=== Graduate school rankings ===
In 2019, Hitotsubashi Law School became 2nd out of all the 72 law schools in Japan according to the ratio, 59.82%, of the successful graduates who passed the bar examination.

Hitotsubashi Business School is ranked 2nd in Japan by Nikkei Shimbun. Eduniversal ranked Japanese business schools and Hitotsubashi was ranked 3rd in Japan (100th in the world). In this ranking, Hitotsubashi is one of three Japanese business schools categorized in "Universal business schools with major international influence". It is one of the few Japanese business schools teaching in English.

=== Alumni rankings ===
Mines ParisTech : Professional Ranking World Universities ranks Hitotsubashi University as 25th in the world in 2011 in the number of alumni listed among CEOs in the 500 largest worldwide companies, although Hitotsubashi is small compared to other Japanese universities in the ranks.

=== Popularity and selectivity ===
Hitotsubashi is one of the most selective universities in Japan. Its entrance difficulty is usually considered one of the most difficult, alongside University of Tokyo, Kyoto University and Tokyo Institute of Technology among 180 national and public universities.

== Notable faculty ==
- Tsuru Shigeto: ex-president of Hitotsubashi University
- Haruhiko Kuroda: former governor of the Bank of Japan and ex-professor of Hitotsubashi University Graduate School of Economics
- J. Mark Ramseyer: ex-adjunct instructor, Mitsubishi professor of Japanese Legal Studies of Harvard Law School
- Ikujiro Nonaka: professor emeritus, a member of Japan Academy, director of Seven & I Holdings Co., director of Mitsui & Co.
- Kotaro Suzumura: professor emeritus, Person of Cultural Merit
- Fumio Hayashi: professor, foreign honorary member of the American Academy of Arts and Sciences
- Takeshi Mizubayashi: professor of Graduate School of Law
- Irmela Hijiya-Kirschnereit: ex-professor, Faculty of Social Sciences
- Hirotaka Takeuchi: professor emeritus
- Joseph Schumpeter: visiting professor in 1931
- Hideo Kiyama, sinologist

== Notable alumni ==
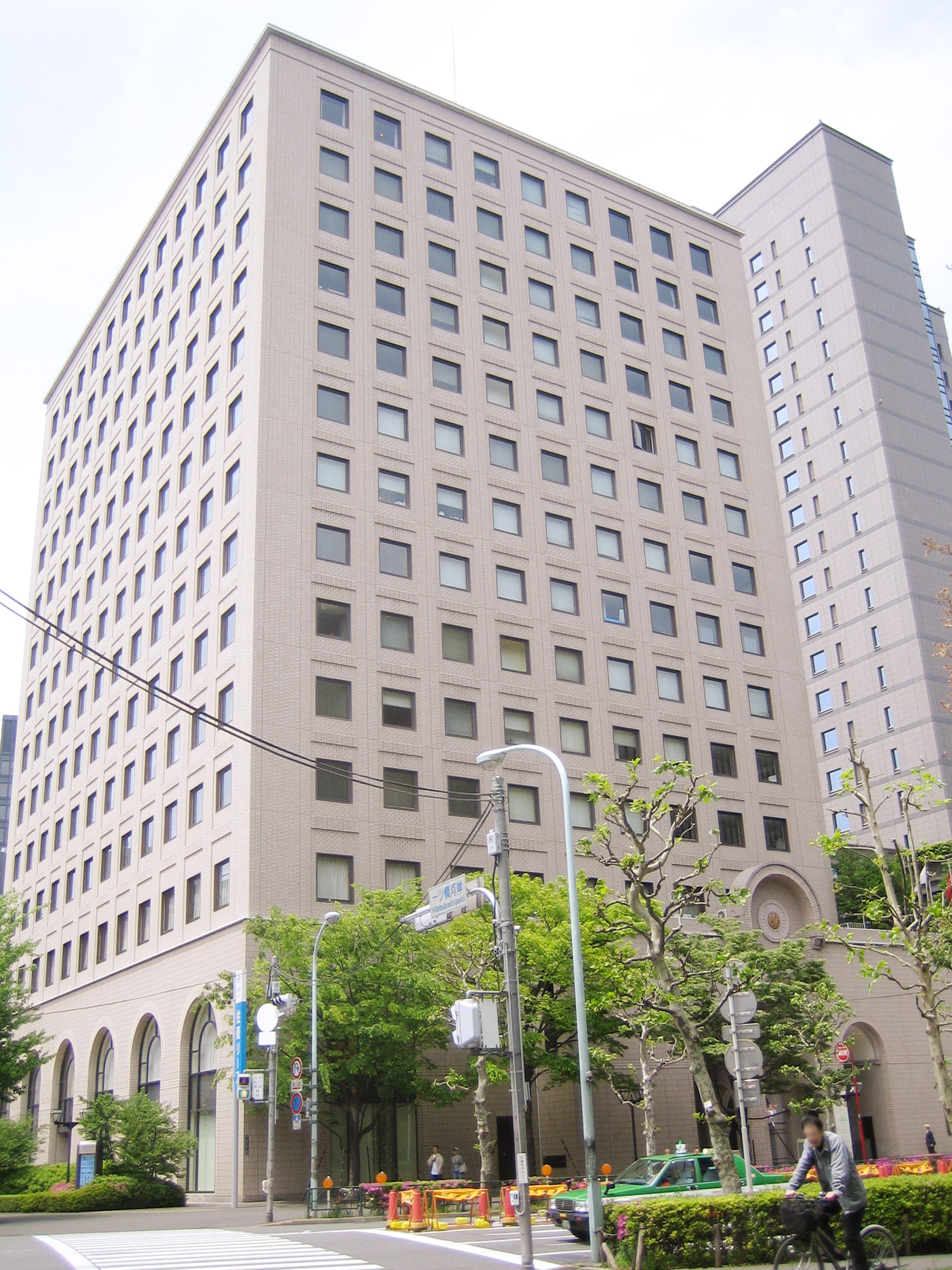
Josui Kaikan

The university's alumni association is called Josuikai (如水会) and its main building (Josui Kaikan) is next to the building where Graduate School of International Corporate Strategy (ICS) is in Kanda, Tokyo.

=== World leaders ===
- The 68th and 69th prime minister of Japan Masayoshi Ōhira (1978–1980)
- The 4th prime minister of South Korea Baek Du-jin (1952–1953)
- The 20th prime minister of Mongolia Rinchinnyamyn Amarjargal (1999–2000)

=== Other politicians ===
- Shōzō Murata: ex-minister of Japanese Government Railways, ex-minister of communications of Japan, president of Osaka Shosen Kaisha (now Mitsui O.S.K. Lines)
- Mitsujirō Ishii: ex-Speaker of the House of Representatives (Japan), ex-deputy prime minister of Japan
- Paek Nam-un: ex-chairman of the Supreme People's Assembly, ex-minister of education (North Korea)
- Togmidyn Dorjkhand: current deputy prime minister of Mongolia
- Aziz Abduhakimov:current deputy prime minister of the Republic of Uzbekistan
- Michio Watanabe: ex-Deputy Prime Minister of Japan, ex-Ministry of Finance (Japan), ex-foreign minister of Japan
- Shinzō Ōya: ex-Ministry of Commerce and Industry (Japan), ex-minister of finance (Japan)
- Zentaro Kosaka: ex-minister for foreign affairs (Japan)
- Kumakichi Nakajima: ex-Ministry of Commerce and Industry (Japan)
- Koji Omi: ex-minister of finance (Japan)
- Tetsuo Kondo: ex-minister of labour
- Saburō Eda: ex-chairman of Japan Socialist Party
- Shintarō Ishihara: author, ex-governor of Tokyo, ex-minister of transportation
- Tsunei Kusunose: former governor of Hiroshima Prefecture
- Hachiro Nitta: current governor of Toyama Prefecture
- Yasuo Tanaka: author and former governor of Nagano Prefecture
- Katsutoshi Kaneda: current minister of justice (Japan)
- Isato Kunisada: ex-parliamentary vice-minister of Cabinet Office (Japan)
- Naoki Minezaki: ex-senior vice minister of the Ministry of Finance (Japan)
- Yoshitake Kimata: ex-chairman of Committee on Economy, Trade and Industry
- Yukinori Nemoto: current state minister of agriculture, forestry and fisheries
- Shigeyuki Tomita: ex-state secretary for foreign affairs of Japan, ex-senior vice minister of the Ministry of Justice (Japan)
- Hajime Seki: ex-mayor of Osaka City
- Taizō Mikazuki: current governor of Shiga Prefecture, ex-senior vice-minister of Land, Infrastructure, Transport and Tourism
- Takashi Kawamura: current mayor of Nagoya City
- Nozomu Suzuki: ex-mayor of Iwata City
- Zenjiro Kaneko: ex-Parliamentary Secretary for Health, Labour and Welfare of Japan
- Koichiro Ichimura: ex-Parliamentary Secretary for Land, Infrastructure and Transport of Japan
- Asahiko Mihara: ex-Parliamentary Vice‐Minister of Defense of Japan
- Yoshinori Suematsu: ex-senior vice-minister of the Cabinet Office (Japan)
- Yosuke Mori: current member of the House of Representatives (Japan)
- Sumiko Takahara: ex-chief of the Economic Planning Agency
- Leong Mun Wai: current secretary-general of the Progress Singapore Party

=== Diplomats ===
- Kōichirō Asakai: Japan's ex-ambassador to the United States
- Sadao Iguchi: Japan's ex- ambassador to the United States
- Katsuji Debuchi: Japan's ex- ambassador to the United States
- Saburō Kurusu: Imperial Japan's ambassador to Germany
- Naotake Satō: ex-president of House of Councillors of Japan, ex-foreign minister of Japan
- Toshikazu Kase: Japan's first ambassador to the United Nations
- Mami Mizutori: Special Representative of the Secretary-General for Disaster Risk Reduction in the UNDRR
- Ichiro Komatsu: ex-director-general of the Cabinet Legislation Bureau, Japan's ex- ambassador to France
- Kenichi Itō: ex-CEO of The Japan Forum on International Relations
- Akira Ariyoshi: Japan's ex-ambassador to Republic of China (1912–1949)
- Kenji Kanasugi: Current Japanese ambassador to the People Republic of China
- Makoto Taniguchi: Japan's ex-ambassador to the United Nations, ex-chairman of UNICEF
- Lee Dong-hwan: South Korea's ex-ambassador to the Australia
- Yukio Okamoto: Diplomatic advisor and analyst
- Maria Zeneida Collinson: the president of the 61st International Atomic Energy Agency (IAEA) General Conference
- Umarjadi Njotowijono: The 2nd secretary-general of ASEAN, Indonesia's first ambassador to the United Nations
- Asako Okai: United Nations Development Programme (UNDP) assistant administrator, director for the UNDP Crisis Bureau, and United Nations Assistant Secretary-General.

=== Judges, bureaucrats ===
- Harumi Takahashi: current governor of Hokkaidō Prefecture
- Kei Komuro: lawyer, husband of former Japanese princess Mako Komuro
- Yoshihiro Yasuda: lawyer
- Saburo Tokura: the 20th chief justice of Japan

=== Industry ===
- Fusanosuke Kuhara: entrepreneur, politician and cabinet minister in the pre-war Empire of Japan, founder of Kuhara Zaibatsu
- Masaru Hayami: ex-governor of the Bank of Japan, ex-CEO of Nissho Iwai Corp.
- Kenkichi Kagami: ex-chairman of Tokio Marine & Fire Insurance Co., Ltd., ex-president of Mitsubishi Bank, Ltd.
- Rizaburo Toyoda: first president of Toyota Motor
- Kizo Yasui: former chairman of Toray Industries, Inc., former vice-chairman of Nihon Keidanren (Japan Business Federation)
- Hiroshi Okuda: ex-chairman of Toyota Motor and chairman of Nihon Keidanren (Japan Business Federation)
- Otogo Kataoka: first president of Nomura Securities Co., Ltd.
- Kunio Egashira: ex-chairman of Ajinomoto Co., Inc.
- Taikichiro Mori: founder of Mori Building (Forbes ranked him as the richest man in the world in 1991 and 1992.)
- Masaaki Tsuya: CEO of Bridgestone Co., Inc.
- Hiroshi Mikitani: founder and CEO of Rakuten Group, Inc.
- Shuji Utsumi: current president of Sega
- Tatsumi Kimishima: current president of Nintendo, former CEO and chairman of Nintendo of America
- Hidesaburō Shōda: ex-CEO of Nisshin Seifun Group, father of the Empress Michiko
- Masatsugu Nagato: current CEO of Japan Post Holdings, former CEO of Japan Post Bank, former chairman of Citibank Japan
- Noritoshi Kanai: ex-chairman of Mutual Trading Co., Inc.

=== Academia ===
- Tokuzō Fukuda: economist, professor emeritus at Tokyo College of Commerce
- Eiichi Sugimoto: economist
- Ichiro Nakayama: economist, president of the Tokyo College of Commerce, the first chairman of The Tax Commission of Japan
- Heizō Takenaka: economist, former Minister of State for Economic and Fiscal Policy of Japan, professor at Keio University
- Hiroko Ōta: economist, professor of National Graduate Institute for Policy Studies, ex-minister of state for special missions of Japan
- Hiroshi Mizuta:economist, professor emeritus at Nagoya University and a member of the Japan Academy
- Hiroshi Shimizu: economist, professor at Waseda University, Winner of 2020 Schumpeter Prize
- Ryuzo Sato: economist, C.V. Starr professor of Economics at New York University
- Thomas T. Sekine: economist, professor at York University
- Takatoshi Ito: economist, professor of School of International and Public Affairs, Columbia University, ex-deputy vice minister of finance for international affairs
- Kotaro Suzumura: economist, Person of Cultural Merit, professor emeritus at School of Political Science and Economics, Waseda University, professor emeritus at Hitotsubashi University
- Jinkichi Tsukui: economist, professor at Osaka University
- Seiichiro Yonekura: economist, professor at Hitotsubashi University and Hosei University, Director of Nippon Genki Juku
- Tran Van Tho: economist, professor of School of Social Sciences, Waseda University
- Takashi Hikino: economist, Associate professor of Graduate School of Economics, Kyoto University
- Yoshinori Fujikawa: economist, Associate Vice President at Hitotsubashi University
- Yoon Ki-jung: economist, professor of Yonsei University
- Hideroku Hara: Legal Scholar, professor emeritus at Shiga University
- Mau-sheng Lee: professor of College of Law, National Taiwan University
- Hisashi Inoue: Historian, professor at Surugadai University
- David Toshio Tsumura: Linguist, Old Testament scholar, Dean of Faculty and professor at Japan Bible Seminary
- Noriko H. Arai: Mathematician, professor at the National Institute of Informatics

=== Others ===
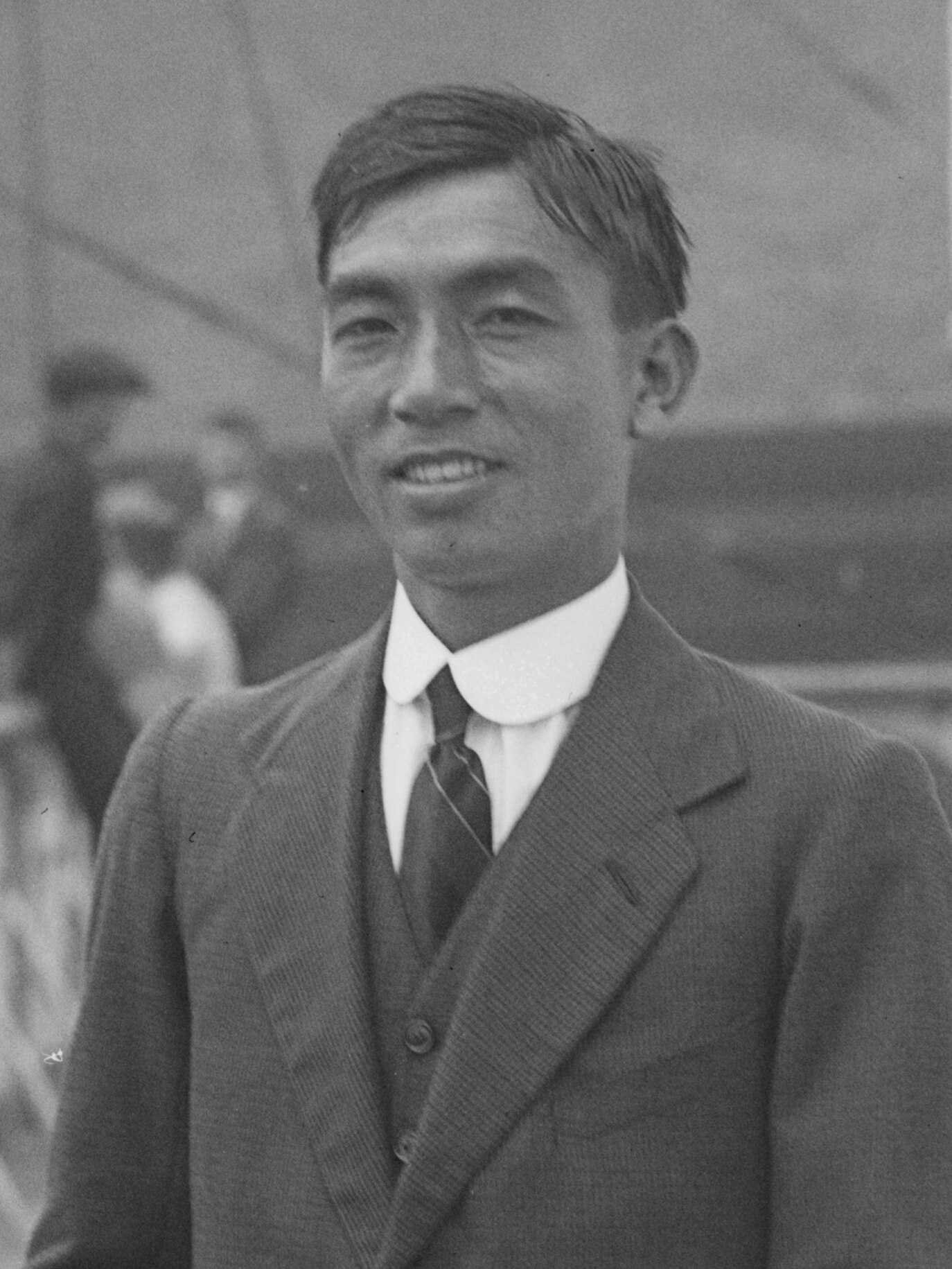
- Tennis Player Zenzo Shimizu, 1921
  Stephen Fumio Hamao: Cardinal of the Roman Catholic Church
- Adebayo Alonge: Nigerian pharmacist
- Takeshi Ito: activist, ex-representative committee member of Nihon Hidankyo
- Aya Domenig: filmmaker (Als die Sonne vom Himmel fiel) of Japanese–Swiss origin.
- Kiyoshi Nishimura: filmmaker
- Sumio Kobayashi: composer
- Akira Kume: actor
- Hiroshi Koike: playwright
- Tamotsu Nakamura: explorer, Fellow of the Royal Geographical Society
- Seiichiro Kashio: athlete, Silver Medalist of men's tennis doubles in 1920 Summer Olympics
- Masaji Kiyokawa: athlete, Gold Medalist of backstroke in 1936 Summer Olympics, ex-vice chairman of International Olympic Committee, ex-CEO of Kanematsu Corp.
- Shinpei Mykawa: rice farmer who introduced rice farming to an area of Texas; he came from a college that became Hitotsubashi University
- Zenzo Shimizu: athlete, tennis player
- Hiroshi Nakano: rower
- Ryuta Arakawa: rower
- Masabumi Hosono: the only Japanese passenger on the RMS Titanic's disastrous maiden voyage
- Hyozo Omori: physical education specialist
- Kichimatsu Kishi: "Baron Kishi", oil developer in the U.S.
- George Shima: "The Potato King", the first President of the Japanese Association of America
- Futabatei Shimei: author, translator
- Kafū Nagai: author
- Christian Polak: author
- Kim Su-yeong: poet
- Takashi Hiraide: poet
- Wataru Yoshizumi: Manga artist
- Iou Kuroda: Manga artist
- Ken Ishii: musician
- Yoshiki Mizuno: musician, member of Ikimono-gakari
- Ichiro Yoshizawa: mountaineer
- Junpei Yasuda:journalist
- Riko Muranaka:medical doctor and journalist
- Yoshiharu Sekino: explorer, surgeon
- Dan Weiss:former Head coach of the Tokyo Excellence
- Kenji Tokitsu: practitioner of Japanese martial arts
- Yasusato Gamō: educator
- Kenkichi Ueda: Imperial Japan's governor-general of Kwantung
