= Shigeto Tsuru =

Japanese politician and economist

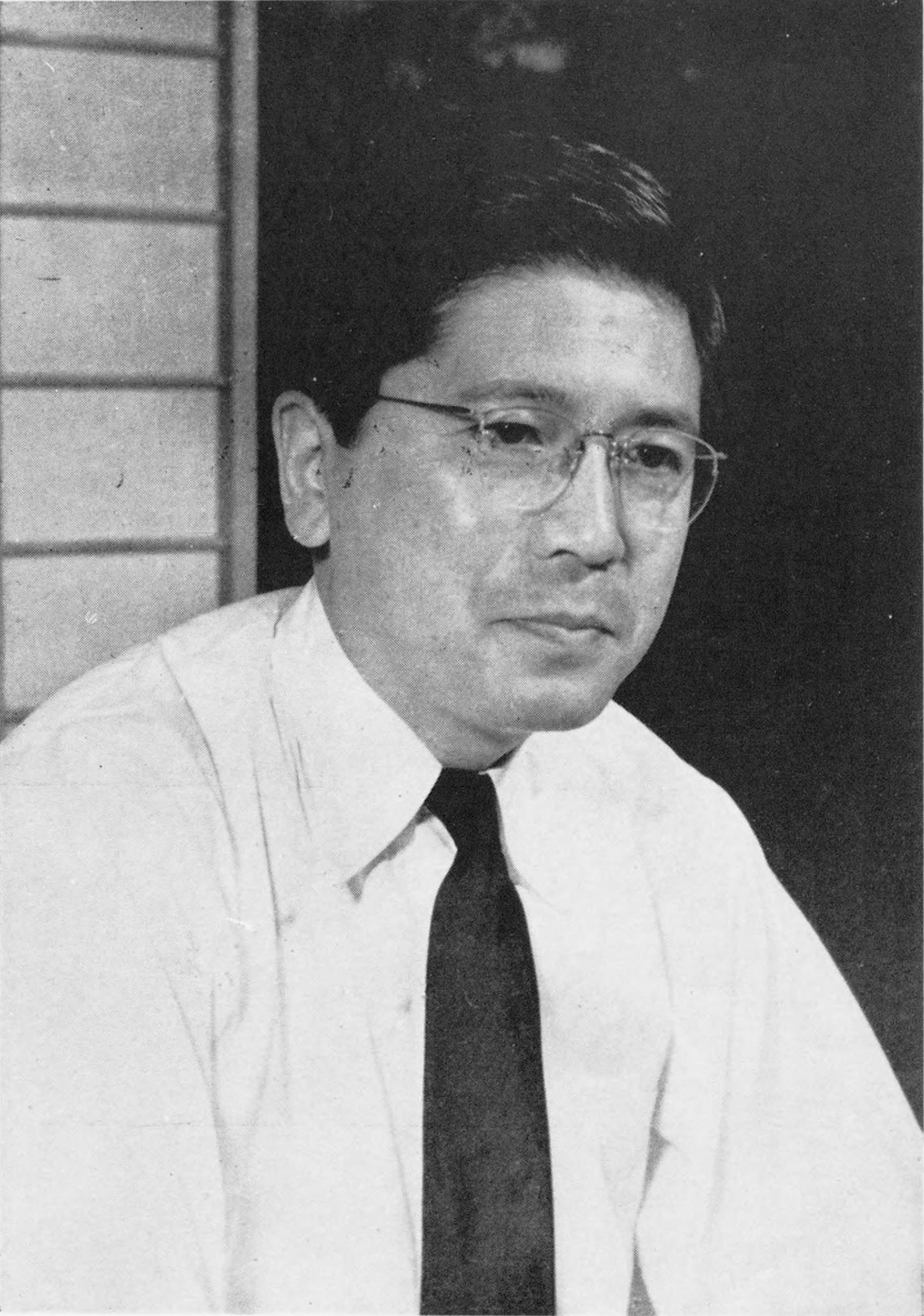
- Shigeto Tsuru (March 1912 - February 2006)
- Born: 都留 重人; March 6, 1912; Nagoya, Japan
- Died: February 5, 2006 (aged 93)
- Occupation: economist
- Notable work: President of the International Economic Association (1977-1980)

Shigeto Tsuru (都留 重人, Tsuru Shigeto; March 6, 1912 – February 5, 2006) was a Japanese economist. He was widely honoured for his scholarship, including the Presidency of the International Economic Association. A pivotal figure in post-war Japanese economic thought, Shigeto Tsuru is widely recognized for his authoritative analysis of Japan's rapid economic reconstruction following its total defeat in World War II, and creator of the concept of creative defeat. He provided both a comprehensive chronology of the recovery process and a distinctive interpretation of the modern Japanese economy. Tsuru critically concluded that while Japan's creative and inspired response to its post-war challenges led to unprecedented economic success, this very success simultaneously generated a new set of persistent and complex problems within its structure.

== Trajectory ==
He was born in 1912, in Nagoya, Japan to Iyo Shida and Nobuo Tsuru, an industrial Engineer. He also had three sisters, Keiko, Sumiko and Hisako. While being a student at the Eighth Higher School (now part of Nagoya University), he became politically involved in 1929–30, as a student leader in the "Anti-Imperialist Leagues", activities against the Japanese military, then in the early stages of aggression towards China.

=== Education and Early Career ===
He was imprisoned for several months. Expelled from the higher school and found himself unable to gain admission to imperial universities, he went to the US for tertiary education. He first matriculated at Lawrence College in Appleton, Wisconsin, then transferred to Harvard University, where he also completed a master's degree later, graduating with Honours in 1935. He was the only member of his graduating class to proceed to graduate school. His fellow graduate student was the renowned economist, Paul Samuelson. Following his marriage, he was awarded his Ph.D. from the same institution in 1940. His doctoral dissertation was titled "Development of capitalism & business cycles in Japan, 1868-1897." He then became a lecturer at Harvard University.

=== Wartime Return and Public Service ===
In 1942, following the outbreak of World War II (and the start of the Pacific War), he resigned his position and returned to Japan on an exchange ship. Upon his return, his wife's uncle, Kōichi Kido, secured him a position as a commissioned staff member at the Ministry of Foreign Affairs through Shigemitsu Mamoru. In 1943, he became a commissioned researcher at the East Asian Economic Research Institute of the former Tokyo University of Commerce (now Hitotsubashi University Institute of Economic Research). Subsequently, after serving as a private second class in Miyakonojō, he returned to work at the Ministry of Foreign Affairs.

In June 1944, Prime Minister Hideki Tōjō dismissed him to pressure Kido Kōichi, with whom Tōjō had a political conflict, and a conscription notice was issued, drafting him into the Imperial Japanese Army. However, Kido pleaded with Tōjō's secretary, Sadao Akamatsu, who intervened on his behalf. Akamatsu arranged for the Foreign Ministry to issue a request to the Army, arguing that he was "irreplaceable by any other person," resulting in his discharge after only three months.

=== Post-War economic and Institutional role ===
After the war, he worked in the Survey and Statistics Division of the Economic and Scientific Section of the General Headquarters (GHQ) of the Allied Powers. In 1947, under the Katayama Cabinet, he was appointed Vice-Chairman of the Overall Coordination Committee of the Economic Stabilization Board (equivalent to Vice-Minister status). In this role, he authored the first post-war economic white paper, the "Report on the Actual State of the Economy."

In 1948, he was appointed professor at Tokyo University of Commerce and simultaneously began hosting the "Suit Seminar" for working adults at his home. Amidst the Cold War and the rise of McCarthyism (the Red Scare), he publicly confessed to having been a Communist during his student years in the United States.

In 1949, he succeeded Ichirō Nakayama as the first director of the newly established Hitotsubashi University Institute of Economic Research. In 1950, he became a member of the 2nd term of the Science Council of Japan. He stepped down as Director of the Institute in 1956. That same year, he became a Visiting Professor at Harvard University, and in 1960, he was a Visiting Professor at Yale University. In 1963, he co-founded the Pollution Research Committee with Ken'ichi Miyamoto and Tokue Shibata, among others. This committee later became the foundation for the Japan Environmental Council. He returned to the position of Director of the Hitotsubashi University Institute of Economic Research in 1965, succeeding Ryōtarō Idachi, and served until 1967. In 1971, he launched the journal Pollution Research (Kōgai Kenkyū).

=== University Presidency and Later Life ===
Due to the lack of candidates willing to serve as president during the campus unrest, which resulted in a three-year presidential vacancy, he became the first President of Hitotsubashi University not to be an alumnus of the institution, serving from 1972. However, he later faced criticism for being a non-alumnus and retired in 1975, becoming an Emeritus Professor of the university.

From 1975 to 1985, he served as an Editorial Advisor for the Asahi Shimbun. In 1986, he became a Professor at Meiji Gakuin University, where he played a central role in the establishment of the Faculty of International Studies. While there, he considered inviting his former students, such as Mitsuharu Itoh and Tomohiko Sekine, but internal conflict arose. Despite the defence of colleagues, including his former student Professor Yoshikazu Miyazaki, he resigned from Meiji Gakuin University in 1990.

He died of prostate cancer on February 5, 2006 at the age of 93. A memorial gathering was held at the Josuikai Hall, attended by over 500 people, including his students, such as Emeritus Professor Mitsuharu Itoh, former Bank of Japan Governor Masaru Hayami, and former Economic Planning Agency Director-General Isamu Miyazaki. His grave is located in Tama Cemetery.

=== Private life ===
His father, Noburō Tsuru, was a former president of Tōhō Gas Co., Ltd. His wife, Masako, was the daughter of the aeronautical engineer Koroku Wada, who served as President of the Tokyo Institute of Technology and Professor Emeritus at the University of Tokyo (and was the younger brother of Kōichi Kido). Masako was also the elder sister of Akiyoshi Wada, a former Professor at the University of Tokyo and former Director of the RIKEN Genomic Sciences Center. The Tsuru family resided in a residential area in Akasaka, Tokyo, on the same compound as the homes of his wife's father (Koroku Wada), his wife's sister's family (Ichirō Higo), and his wife's aunt's family (Bunroku Shishi).

== Bibliography ==
- On Reproduction Schemes, 1942, in Paul Sweezy, Theory of Capitalist Development
- Has Capitalism Changed?: An International Symposium on the Nature of Contemporary Capitalism, (Iwanami, 1961).
- Environmental Disruption: Proceedings of International Symposium, March, 1970, Tokyo, (International Social Science Council, 1970).
- Growth and Resources Problems Related to Japan: Proceedings of Session VI of the Fifth Congress of the International Economic Association held in Tokyo, Japan, (Macmillan, 1978).
- Tsuru, Shigeto (1982), "The significance of Marxian political economy in the present-day world", in Meek, Ronald; Bradley, Ian C.; Howard, Michael C. (eds.), Classical and Marxian political economy: essays in honour of Ronald L. Meek, London: Macmillan, pp. 276–290, ISBN 9780333321997.
- The Political Economy of the Environment: The Case of Japan. London : Athlone, 1999.
- Towards a New Political Economy, 1976.
- Institutional Economics Revisited, 1993
- Japan's Capitalism: Creative Defeat and Beyond, 1993
