= Mark Ravina =

American historian

Academic background
- Education: Columbia University (BA); Stanford University (PhD)

Academic work
- Discipline: Japanese history
- Institutions: Emory University; University of Texas at Austin

Mark Ravina (born 1961) is a scholar of early modern (Tokugawa) Japanese history and Japanese Studies at the University of Texas at Austin, where he has taught since 2019. He currently holds the Mitsubishi Heavy Industries Chair in Japanese Studies. From 1991 to 2019 he taught at Emory University. Outside of academic circles, he is likely most well known for his book The Last Samurai: the Life and Battles of Saigō Takamori, published in 2004.

Much of Ravina's scholarly work centers on notions of national identity and state-building in early modern Japan. His book Land and Lordship in Early Modern Japan (published in 1999) centers on this topic, as do a number of journal articles and talks given by Ravina. He is one of only a few scholars actively working to challenge those who equate the Tokugawa shogunate's authority with the "state" in Japan in this period. Working off of the ideas and terms coined by Takeshi Mizubayashi, Ravina explores the notion of a "compound state" in which the daimyō (feudal lords) are not merely governors in the service of the Tokugawa regime, but rulers of semi-independent states within the greater Tokugawa state. This alternative to the traditional view of a monolithic, unified Edo period Japanese state invites not only rethinking of a great many aspects of Edo period history, but also engages with a wider ongoing scholarly discourse on the notions of "nation" and "state" in general. Numerous scholars, including Luke S. Roberts, Ronald Toby and John Whitney Hall have made reference to his work, engaging with it in their own pursuits of a reexamination of notions of statehood and national identity in the Tokugawa period. The influence of this new discourse on statehood is evident in the use of the plural "Japanese States" in the title of the newest book by Timon Screech, a specialist on Edo period art history: The Shogun's Painted Culture: Fear and Creativity in the Japanese States, 1760-1829. His most recent book To Stand with the Nations of the World: Japan's Meiji Restoration in World History won the 2018 book prize from the Southeast Conference of the Association for Asian Studies

Land and Lordship was translated into Japanese and released as Meikun no satetsu in 2004.

Ravina also served as a guest consultant in two documentary films about the samurai and Tokugawa Japan in 2003, following upon the success of the film The Last Samurai. The title and subject of his book on Saigō Takamori, upon whom the film's central character Lord Katsumoto was based, was purely coincidence.

Having published a number of articles on state-building and national identity within Tokugawa Japan, Ravina is now turning towards addressing the subject as it pertains to Tokugawa Japan in a more global context.

He earned his BA from Columbia University in 1983, and his MA and PhD from Stanford University in 1988 and 1991 respectively.

== Selected publications ==
=== Books ===
- To Stand with the Nations of the World: Japan's Meiji Restoration in World History Oxford University Press, 2018. (ISBN 978-0195327717)
- Land and Lordship in Early Modern Japan. Stanford University Press, 1999. (ISBN 978-0-8047-2898-0)
- The Last Samurai: the Life and Battles of Saigō Takamori. John Wiley & Sons, 2004. (ISBN 978-0-471-08970-4)

=== Articles ===
- State-building and Political Economy in Early-modern Japan. The Journal of Asian studies. 54, no. 4, (1995): 997
- Japanese state-making in Global Context: World culture and Meiji Japan. in Richard Boyd and Tak-wing Ngo (eds.) State Making in Asia 2006. (ISBN 978-0-415-34611-5)
- State-making in Global Context:Japan in a World of Nation-States. in Joshua Fogel (ed.) The Teleology of the Modern Nation-State: Japan and China. U Penn Press, 2004. (ISBN 978-0-8122-3820-4)
