= Asian Future Leaders Scholarship =

The Asian Future Leaders Scholarship Program (Chinese: 亚洲未来领袖奖学金计划, AFLSP) is a newly launched program established by the Bai Xian Education Foundation (百贤教育基金会). In its pilot phase, it will offer 100 students full scholarships to study for one or two years towards an MPhil, MBA or MPA at one of six leading universities in Asia, being Peking University, Zhejiang University, Hong Kong University of Science and Technology, Kyoto University, Waseda University. and Hitotsubashi University.

Ronald Chao, founder of the Bai Xian Education Foundation, said he hopes "the scholarship program will attract the best students and universities." The goal of the program is to foster closer ties between Asian neighbor countries.
