= Tsumura (surname) =

Tsumura (written: 津村) is a Japanese surname. Notable people with the surname include:

- David Toshio Tsumura (born 1944), Japanese linguist, Old Testament scholar and writer
- Keisuke Tsumura (津村 啓介, born 1971), Japanese politician
- Kenji Tsumura (津村 健志, born 1986), Japanese Magic: The Gathering player
- Kikuko Tsumura (津村 記久子, born 1978), Japanese writer
- Makoto Tsumura (津村 まこと, born 1965), Japanese voice actress
- Scott Tsumura (born 1942), American video game producer
