= Takeshi Mizubayashi =

Takeshi Mizubayashi (水林 彪, Mizubayashi Takeshi, born December 1947) is a professor in the Graduate School of Law at Hitotsubashi University, and professor emeritus of Tokyo Metropolitan University. His field of specialty is the history of law in Japan, though he is perhaps most well known for his arguments regarding the political organization of Tokugawa Japan.

Mizubayashi earned his bachelor's degree from the Faculty of Law at Tokyo University in 1970, and a master's degree from the Graduate School, Division of Law and Politics at the same university, in 1972.

He served as the Chairman of the Board of Directors of the Japan Legal History Association from 2005–2008.

== Research ==
Mizubayashi coined the term "compound state" (複合国家, fukugō kokka), a term now widely used by Western scholars as well, including Mark Ravina and Ronald Toby. Using this term, Mizubayashi and others reenvision the Tokugawa state not as a single, unified, bureaucratic entity, but as a feudal conglomeration of domains (藩, han) loosely tied together by their fealty to the shogunate, and by other obligations and systems imposed by the shogunate. In other words, he refocuses attention away from the shogunate, to the individual domains; building upon Mizubayashi's work, a considerable number of scholars have since published articles and books analyzing the history of individual han and reconsidering the extent to which they might be regarded as separate small countries, more loosely connected to the shogunate than was previously thought.

Mizubayashi also argued that the decentralized nature of the Tokugawa state was due not primarily to a weak shogunate, but to the strength of the domains (han). In particular, he pointed to the strength of the ie system, under which daimyō (feudal lords) were dedicated to protecting the honor, integrity, and wealth or power of their clan. Not strictly a matter of family or household honor and integrity, ie or clans were often continued by an adopted heir without diminishing its legitimacy. In Mizubayashi's vision, the political system of Tokugawa Japan was founded upon the ie. Tokugawa Japan consisted of a number of daimyō clans enfeoffed by the Tokugawa clan, and in turn regarding other smaller samurai clans, merchant households, and peasant households as their vassals or subjects; Ravina also points out that religious institutions were frequently operated like ie in the Tokugawa period, with continuation of the order under an heir (adopted or otherwise) of the current head.

== Selected publications ==
- 「近世の法と国制研究序説」 (Kinsei no hō to kokusei kenkyū josetsu, "Introduction to Early Modern Law and Research of the Nation-System"). Parts 1–6. 国家学会雑誌 (Kokka gakkai zasshi, "Journal of the Association of Political and Social Sciences") vol. 90–95. 1977–1982.
- 「封建制の再編と日本的社会の確立」 (Hōkensei no saihen to Nihon-teki shakai no kakuritsu, "Reorganization of the Feudal System and the Establishment of Japanese Society"). Tokyo: Yamakawa Publishing, 1987.
- 「徳島藩の史的構造」 (Tokushima han no shiteki kōzō, "Historical Construction of Tokushima Domain"). Meicho Publishing, 1975.
