= Ichiro Suzuki (disambiguation) =

Ichiro Suzuki (born 1973) is a Japanese former professional baseball player.

Ichiro Suzuki is also the name of:

- Ichiro Suzuki (engineer) (born 1937), Japanese automotive engineer responsible for the design and construction of the first Lexus LS
- Ichiro Suzuki (footballer) (born 1995), Japanese football player
