= Adebayo Alonge =

Nigerian pharmacist, inventor and tech entrepreneur

MNIM Adebayo Alonge
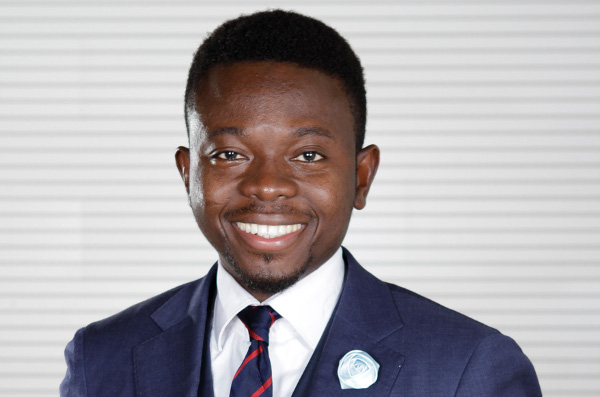
- Adebayo Alonge, 2019
- Other name: Samuel
- Education: King's College, Lagos (Senior School Certificate); University of Ibadan (Bachelor of Pharmacy); Lagos Business School (Master of Business Administration); Yale School of Management (Master of Advanced Management); John F. Kennedy School of Government (Master of Public Administration); Graduate School of International Corporate Strategy (International business)
- Known for: Invention of RxScanner

Adebayo Alonge is a Nigerian pharmacist, inventor, deep tech entrepreneur, and market development professional. He is the winner of the 2019 Hello Tomorrow Global Deeptech Challenge, known as the BNP Paribas Group Deep Tech Award, for creating a handheld nanoscanner that detects counterfeit drugs.

He is the CEO and co-founder of RxAll Inc., a U.S. based deep tech start-up firm. He studied in Lagos.

== Education ==
Adebayo Alonge attended King's College, Lagos, between 1996 and 2002. He studied pharmacy at the University of Ibadan, and graduated with first-class honors in 2008. He had a Master of Business Administration degree on Strategy and Finance from the Lagos Business School and Pan-Atlantic University and holds a Master of Advanced Management from Yale School of Management. He is an alumnus of Hitotsubashi University Graduate School of International Corporate Strategy and is currently studying Master of Public Administration at Harvard Kennedy School.

== Career ==
Adebayo Alonge served as a medical representative of Sanofi between November 2009 and September 2010, as well as a contract pharmacist at the Global HIV/AIDS Initiative. He worked as a medical representative of Roche from September 2010 to October 2012, and as a market development intern of BASF, a German chemical company where he worked from July 2013 to October 2013. He worked as a market developer at BASF West Africa from August 2014 to August 2015 as well, and he was a director of business development at Lusoy Investments Limited between April 2012 and October 2017, and during November 2015 to October 2017, he worked as a consultant at the Boston Consulting Group.

In 2016, Alonge co-founded RxAll Inc. It has three co-founders: Alonge as the chief executive official, Amy Kao as the chief marketing officer, and Wei Liu as the chief technology officer.

== Awards, honours and recognition ==
Adebayo Alonge has received the Adekunle Ajasin Award for Academic Excellence in 2008, the Mandela Washington Fellowship from the United States Department of State in 2014, and the Global Social Venture Award from InnovateHealth, Yale University, in 2016. Adebayo Alonge won the 2018 China Award for Best DeepTech Platform in the World; he also got a €100,000 prize for a DeepTech award. He won the Grand Winner & Digital Health Winner in 2019, the Hello Tomorrow Global Challenge 2019, the Young Innovator – YouWin!, the Regional finalist, the Hult Prize Global Case Competition and awards in person from Barack Obama (ex-president of the United States) and Justin Trudeau (prime minister of Canada).

== See also ==
- RxAll
