= Ichirō (name) =

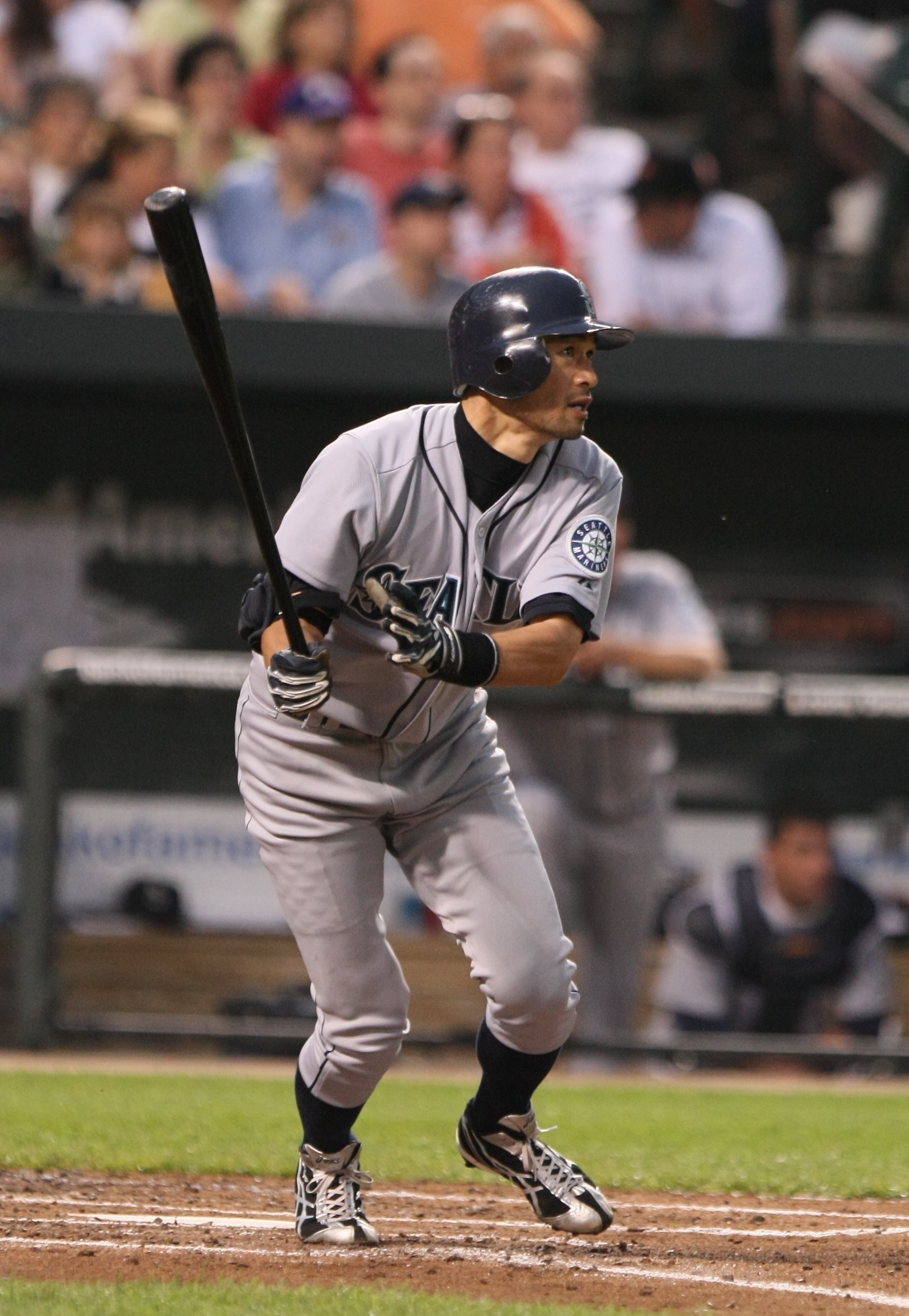
- Ichiro Suzuki, a Japanese professional baseball player
- Pronunciation: [itɕiꜜɾoː]
- Gender: Male
- Language: Japanese

Origin
- Origin: Japanese
- Meaning: first son but it can have other meanings depending on the kanji characters used
- Region of origin: Japan

Ichirō (いちろう, イチロー), also written Ichiro, Ichirou or Ichiroh is a masculine Japanese given name. The name is occasionally given to the first-born son in a family.

Like many Japanese names, Ichirō can be written using different kanji characters and can mean:

- 一郎: "first son"
- 一朗: "first clear, bright"

== People with the name ==
- Ichiro Abe (安部 一郎; 1922-2022), Japanese judoka
- Ichirō Banzai (坂西 一良; 1891–1945), Japanese general
- Ichiro Fujiyama (藤山 一郎, 1911–1993), a Japanese singer
- Ichiro Furuyama (古山 一郎; 1907–?), Japanese discus thrower
- Ichirō Hatoyama (鳩山 一郎, 1883–1959), a Japanese politician and the 52nd, 53rd, and 54th Prime Minister of Japan
- Ichirō Hiura (日浦 市郎; born 1966), Japanese shogi player
- Ichiro Hosotani (細谷 一郎; born 1946), Japanese footballer
- Ichiro Ito (伊藤 一朗, born 1967), a Japanese rock guitarist
- Ichirō Komatsu (小松 一郎; 1951–2014), Japanese diplomat, civil servant and politician
- Ichiro Miyake (三宅 市郎, 1881–1964), a Japanese mycologist
- Ichiro "Aniki" Mizuki (水木 一郎, 1948–2022), a Japanese vocalist
- Ichiro Murakoshi (村越 伊知郎, 1930-2007), a Japanese voice actor
- Ichirō Nagai (永井 一郎, 1931-2014), a Japanese voice actor
- Ichiro Nakagawa (中川 一郎, 1925–1983), a Japanese politician from Hokkaidō
- Ichirō Ozawa (小沢 一郎, born 1942), a Japanese politician, and Secretary-General of the Democratic Party of Japan
- Ichiro Serizawa (芹沢 一郎; born 1945), Japanese fencer
- Ichirō Shimada (島田 一郎, 1848–1878), an assassin of Ōkubo Toshimichi
- Ichiro Suzuki (鈴木 一朗, born 1973), a Japanese baseball outfielder
- Ichiro Suzuki (engineer) (鈴木 一郎, born 1937), a Japanese automobile engineer
- Ichiro Yamaguchi (山口 一郎, born 1980), a Japanese musician (sakanaction)
- Ichiro Yoshizawa (吉沢 一郎, 1903–1998), a Japanese mountaineer and expedition leader

== Fictional characters ==
- Ichiro Ogami (大神 一郎), a character in Sakura Wars video game.
- Ichiro Miyata (宮田 一郎), a fictional character in the anime and manga series Hajime no Ippo
