= Ichio =

Ichio or Ichiō may refer to:

== People ==
- Ichio Asukata (1926–2012), Japanese politician and mayor of Yokohama from 1963 to 1978
- Ichio Mori, husband of Japanese actress Keiko Tsushima and former director of Tokyo Broadcasting System (TBS)
- Ōkubo Ichiō, Governor of Tokyo from 1872 to 1875

== Other uses ==
- Ichio Kusakari, a fictional character in the 2000 Hong Kong film Born to Be King
- Ichio Station, a train station in Takatori, Nara Prefecture, Japan

== See also ==
- Ichirō (name)
- Itch.io
