= Sugimoto =

Sugimoto (written: 杉本) is a Japanese surname. Notable people with the surname include:

- Atsuko Sugimoto (杉本 充子; born 1959), Japanese sport shooter
- Aya Sugimoto (杉本 彩; born 1968), Japanese television personality, actress, dancer and writer
- Daichi Sugimoto (杉本 大地; born 1993), Japanese footballer
- Eiichi Sugimoto (杉本 栄一; 1901–1952), Japanese economist and academic
- Etsu Inagaki Sugimoto (杉本 鉞子; 1874–1950), Japanese writer
- Henry Sugimoto (1900–1990), American artist
- Hideyo Sugimoto (杉本 英世; born 1938), Japanese golfer
- Hiroshi Sugimoto (杉本 博司; born 1948), Japanese photographer
- Hiroyuki Sugimoto (杉本 裕之; born 1986), Japanese footballer
- Kazuo Sugimoto (杉本 和陽; born 1991), Japanese shogi player
- Keita Sugimoto (杉本 恵太; born 1982), Japanese footballer
- Kenkichi Sugimoto (1905–2004), Japanese painter
- Kenyu Sugimoto (杉本 健勇; born 1992), Japanese footballer
- Kimio Sugimoto (杉本 公雄; born 1957), Japanese volleyball player
- Kyota Sugimoto (杉本 京太; 1882–1972), Japanese inventor
- Makoto Sugimoto (杉本 真; born 1987), Japanese footballer
- Masao Sugimoto (born 1967), Japanese footballer
- Masataka Sugimoto (杉本 昌隆; born 1968), Japanese shogi player
- Michiharu Sugimoto (杉本 倫治; born 1981), Japanese footballer
- Mika Sugimoto (杉本 美香; born 1984), Japanese judoka
- Miki Sugimoto (杉本 美樹; born 1953), Japanese actress
- Noboru Sugimoto (杉本 盛; born 1914), Japanese swimmer
- Risa Sugimoto (杉本 梨沙; born 1994), Japanese squash player
- Ryuji Sugimoto (杉本 竜士; born 1993), Japanese footballer
- Sayuri Sugimoto (杉本 早裕吏; born 1996), Japanese rhythmic gymnast
- Shigeo Sugimoto (杉本 茂雄; 1926–2002), Japanese footballer
- Taku Sugimoto, Japanese guitarist
- Takuya Sugimoto (杉本 拓也; born 1989), Japanese footballer
- Taro Sugimoto (杉本 太郎; born 1996), Japanese footballer
- Tatsuo Sugimoto (杉本 龍勇; born 1970), Japanese sprinter
- Tetta Sugimoto (杉本 哲太; born 1965), Japanese actor
- Yoshio Sugimoto (杉本 良夫; born 1939), Japanese sociologist
- Yū Sugimoto (杉本 ゆう; born 1975), Japanese voice actress
- Yumi Sugimoto (杉本 有美; born 1989), Japanese model, actress, gravure idol and singer

== See also ==
- Sugamoto, another Japanese surname
