= Egashira =

Egashira (written: 江頭) is a Japanese surname. Notable people with the surname include:

- Hideharu Egashira (江頭 秀晴; born 1965), better known as Egashira 2:50, Japanese comedian
- Kunio Egashira (江頭 邦雄; 1937–2008), Japanese businessman
