= Ishiro =

Ishiro may refer to:

- Chamacoco language, or Ishiro, a language of South America
- Chamacoco, or Ishiro, an ethnic group of South America
- Ishirō Honda (1911–1993), Japanese film director

== See also ==
- Ichirō (name), a Japanese name
