= List of Nigerian inventions and discoveries =

Nigerian inventions and discoveries are items, techniques or discoveries which owe their existence either partially or entirely to a person born in Nigeria, or a citizen of Nigeria or to a person born abroad of Nigerian heritage.

== Automotive and Engineering ==
- Ezekiel Izuogu

== Medicine and Health ==
- EAT-SET — Auto-transfusion system by Oviemo Ovadje
- RxScanner — Handheld nano-scanner to detect counterfeit drugs using molecular fingerprinting
