= Kenkichi Kagami =

Japanese businessman

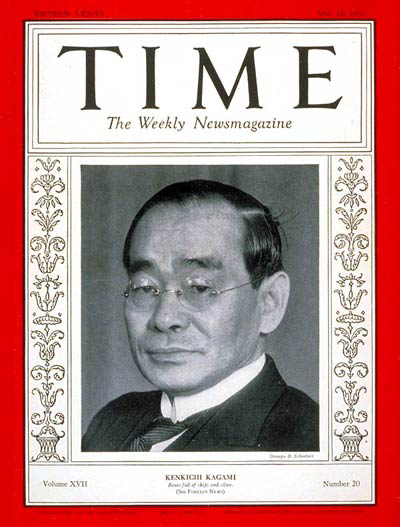
Kenkichi Kagami on the cover of Time in May 1931

Kenkichi Kagami (各務 鎌吉, Kagami Kenkichi; 1869 - 1939) was a Japanese businessman.

== Career ==
He graduated from Hitotsubashi University (then Kōtō Shōgyō Gakkō [Higher Commercial School]).

Kagami was a leader in Japan's maritime insurance business. From 1925 to 1939, Kagami was chairman of Tokyo Marine Insurance (Tokio Kaijo Kasai). In the same time period, he also headed other companies; and he was on the board of the core holding company of the Mitsubishi organization.

In 1929-1935, he was president of Nippon Yusen. For a time, he was also president of the Mitsubishi Bank.
