= Sugamoto =

Sugamoto (written: 菅本) is a Japanese surname. Notable people with the surname include:

- Gaku Sugamoto (菅本 岳, born 1994), Japanese footballer
- Yoshito Sugamoto (菅本 儀人, born 1973), better known as Gamma, Japanese professional wrestler

== See also ==
- Sugimoto, another Japanese surname
