= Masaaki Tsuya =

Japanese businessman

- Education: Hitotsubashi University; University of Chicago's Booth School of Business
- Occupation: Businessman

Masaaki Tsuya (津谷 正明, Tsuya Masaaki) is a Japanese businessman. He served as the chairman and chief executive officer of Bridgestone from 2012 to 2020.
