= Sumiko Takahara =

- 高原 須美子

Director-General of the Economic Planning Agency
- In office 10 August 1989 – 28 February 1990
- Prime Minister: Toshiki Kaifu
- Preceded by: Michio Ochi
- Succeeded by: Hideyuki Aizawa

Personal details
- Born: 16 June 1933 Tokyo, Japan
- Died: 19 August 2001 (aged 68)
- Education: Hitotsubashi University

Sumiko Takahara (16 June 1933 – 19 August 2001) was an economist, Japanese Ambassador (to Finland, 1995–1998), chief of the now-defunct Economic Planning Agency, and the first female president of Japanese baseball’s Central League (March 1998 – December 2000).

== Biography ==
Takahara worked as a reporter for Mainichi Shimbun (1955–1963) after graduating from Hitotsubashi University. Takahara was the Economic Planning Agency (EPA) chief under Prime Minister Toshiki Kaifu between August 1989 and February 1990, becoming the sixth woman and the first female nonpolitician in history to join the Cabinet. She stepped down from her position with the Central League when she needed to be hospitalized for mycosis fungoides. Her death was attributed to malignant lymphoma.

== See also ==
- Women in baseball
