= Kiyama (surname) =

Kiyama (written: 木山 meaning "tree mountain" or 喜山) is a Japanese surname. Notable people with the surname include:

- Hideo Kiyama (木山 英雄, born 1934), Japanese sinologist
- Kohei Kiyama (喜山 康平, born 1988), Japanese footballer
- Takashi Kiyama (木山 隆之, born 1972), Japanese footballer and manager
