= Yoshinori Fujikawa =

Japanese academic and economist

- Born: 29 January 1969 (age 57)
- Education: Hitotsubashi University; Harvard Business School; Pennsylvania State University

Yoshinori Fujikawa (藤川 佳則 Fujikawa Yoshinori, born January 29, 1969) is a Japanese academic and economist. He is an Associate Vice President at Hitotsubashi University, and serves as Associate Professor and MBA Program Director at Hitotsubashi University Business School, School of International Corporate Strategy (Hitotsubashi ICS).

== Biography ==
Fujikawa was born on January 29, 1969, in Kyoto, Japan. He has received BA in Economics and MA in Commerce from Hitotsubashi University in Tokyo, MBA from Harvard Business School and PhD in Marketing from Pennsylvania State University. While attending Harvard Business School, he also worked as Research Associate at the Mind of Market Laboratory and the Division of Research. His business experience includes marketing research and strategic consulting work with Olson Zaltman Associates, the inventor of the patented research method ZMET (Zaltman Metaphor Elicitation Technique).

In 2003, he joined as MBA Director the Faculty of Hitotsubashi ICS, where he also conducts Marketing and Service Management courses. He has taught numerous courses including Digital Disruption, Japanese Business & Economy, Marketing, Service Management, Global Network Project for the MBA Program and Realizing Customer Value and Management Essentials for the EMBA Program.

Fujikawa has taken the lead in the global initiatives Global Network for Advanced Management and BEST Alliance.

In April 2018, Fujikawa was appointed as Associate Vice President of International Affairs at Hitotsubashi University.

Fujikawa has been proactively involved in government committees and professional institutions. His current positions include: Ministry of Economy, Trade and industry (IoT Acceleration Lab); Japan-US Educational Commission (Fulbright Japan Program); Adobe Systems (advisor); ARM Treasure Data (advisor); ClipLine (advisor), The Delphi Network (advisor); Zero to One (advisor). Previously, he served at Lawson, Inc., Lawson University (advisor); Panasonic Corporation, Smart Solutions Development Center (advisor); Recruit Holdings Co., Ltd., Management Competence Lab (advisor).
