= Maria Zeneida Collinson =

Filipina ambassador, IAEA president

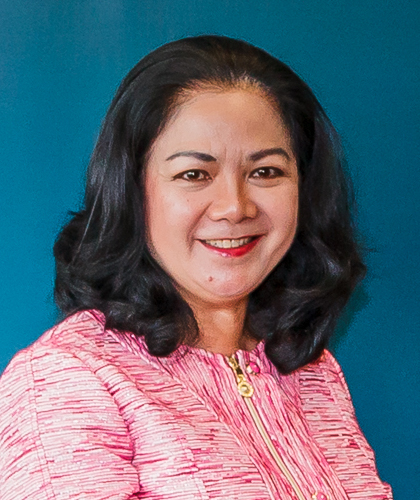
- Occupation: Diplomat

Maria Zeneida Angara Collinson is a Filipino diplomat, who served as the Philippine Ambassador to Austria in 2017. She was elected the President of the 61st International Atomic Energy Agency (IAEA) General Conference and their Ambassador and Resident Representative to the international organizations in Vienna. She is concurrently accredited to Croatia, Slovenia and Slovakia. Collinson is also a member of the IAEA's Board of Governors.

She was also ambassador to Sweden with concurrent accreditation to Estonia, Latvia, Lithuania and Finland from 2007 to 2012, and Consul General in Sydney, Australia from 2002 to 2004.

== Education ==
Angara Collinson earned a Master of Arts in Economics and Trade Policy from the Hitotsubashi University in Tokyo, and a bachelor's degree in Japanology with a focus in economics from the Tokyo University of Foreign Affairs.

== Role in the IAEA ==
Collinson was present for the 2015's Nuclear Olympiad award ceremony in Vienna for fellow Filipino Anton Tanquintic.

Collinson was also present at a June 2017 public meeting of the IAEA representing the Philippines. At the beginning of the 61st General Conference of the IAEA in September 2017, Collinson was elected president by its delegates, who then approved the membership of Grenada.
