= Yasusato Gamō =

Japanese educator and Scout

- 蒲生 保郷
- Born: August 1873; Nagasaki Prefecture, Japan
- Died: 11 September 1928 (aged 55)
- Occupation: High school teacher

Yasusato Gamō (蒲生 保郷, Gamō Yasusato; Nagasaki Prefecture August 1873 - September 11, 1928) was a Japanese educator.

== Biography ==
Gamō graduated from Tokyo Commercial High School (now Hitotsubashi University). From 1909 to 1910 when he was a professor at the Yamaguchi Commercial High School, he studied abroad in the United Kingdom and stayed in London as a foreign exchange student through the Ministry of Education. During that period, he became interested in the activities of Boy Scouts, and gathered books on the Scouting movement to take back to Japan.

After returning home, Gamō gave the books he collected on British Boy Scouts to Prime Minister Katsura Tarō and Minister of Education Komatsubara Eitarō, and submitted a written letter to the government in 1910, that they should consider group youth activities in Japan.

From December 1921 to August 1927, Gamō was the first principal of the Fukushima Commercial High School (now Faculty of Economics, Fukushima University).

== Works ==
- 1923: 会計学原論
- 英国に於ける計算人の職務の一として「計算書類の作成」に就て（大正5年、山口高商第十週年記念講演集）
