= Hisashi Inoue (historian) =

Japanese historian (born 1950)

Hisashi Inoue (井上 久士, Inoue Hisashi; born 1950) is a Japanese historian. His area of expertise is modern Chinese history and Sino-Japanese relations. Since 2001, he has been a professor in the faculty of law at Surugadai University after having served as associate professor at the same university.

He received a master's degree from Hitotsubashi University’s department of sociological research and then attained a doctorate in the same field.

He is the managing director of the “Chūgokujin Sensō Higaisha no Yōkyū wo Sasaeru Kai”, which provides legal support for Chinese victims of Japanese war crimes, and within that organization he heads an executive committee charged with seeking a formal apology and reparations from the Japanese government for the Pingdingshan massacre.

Inoue is an active researcher on the Nanjing Massacre and believes that more than 100,000 POWs, captured plainclothes guerrillas, and civilians were murdered by the Japanese army in Nanjing and its vicinity and in the surrounding six counties.

He and his colleague Akira Fujiwara supervised the first Japanese translation of Iris Chang's The Rape of Nanking which was not released because Chang refused to change the text in 62 places where Inoue had advised making corrections.

== Works ==
- 『中国国民政府史の研究』（汲古書院）
- 「南京事件と遺体埋葬問題」、「南京事件と中国共産党」『南京事件を考える』Edited with Akira Fujiwara, Katsuichi Honda, and Tomio Hora（大月書店、1987）
- 「遺体埋葬からみた南京事件犠性者数」『南京大虐殺の現場へ』Edited with Akira Fujiwara, Katsuichi Honda, and Tomio Hora（朝日新聞社、1988）
- 『南京大虐殺否定論 13のウソ』南京事件調査研究会 編（柏書房、1999）
- 「南京大虐殺と中国国民党国際宣伝処」『現代歴史学と南京事件』Edited with Tokushi Kasahara and Yutaka Yoshida（柏書房、2006）
