= Yukio Okamoto =

Japanese political pundit

- 岡本 行夫
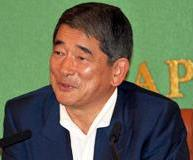
- Yukio Okamoto in 2009
- Born: 23 November 1945
- Died: 24 April 2020 (aged 74); Tokyo, Japan
- Education: Hitotsubashi University
- Occupation: Political advisor
- Years active: 1968–2020

Yukio Okamoto (Japanese: 岡本 行夫, Okamoto Yukio; 23 November 1945 – 24 April 2020) was a Japanese diplomat, diplomatic analyst, and proponent of strong economic and political Japan–United States relations. Okamoto guided Japanese and American diplomatic relations throughout the 1980s, during an era when both countries simultaneously competed for economic influence on the global stage. He served as a diplomatic advisor and analyst for several Japanese prime ministers, including Ryutaro Hashimoto from 1996 to 1998 and Junichiro Koizumi from 2003 until 2004.

== Biography ==
Okamoto was a native of Kanagawa Prefecture. He was a graduate of Kanagawa Prefectural Shonan Senior High School, and graduated from Hitotsubashi University in 1968.

He joined the Japanese Foreign Ministry in 1968, where he worked for more than 20 years. From 1968 to 1970 he was a special student at Swarthmore College, in Swarthmore PA; this was under a program whereby the Japanese Foreign Ministry sent new foreign service officers to the college. He was posted to diplomatic missions in Paris, Cairo and Washington D.C. Okamoto rose to become the director of the foreign ministry's First North America Division, which guided U.S.-Japanese relations.

Okamoto left his job in Ministry of Foreign Affairs for the private sector in 1991, a rare move for a senior Japanese diplomat. He established his own political and economic consulting agency, Okamoto Associates Inc.

However, he remained a leading figure within Japanese-American diplomatic and political circles. He closely advised Japanese prime ministers on some of their most sensitive bilateral issues, ranging from the controversial U.S. military bases on Okinawa to the commemorations marking the 70th anniversary of World War II in 2015.

Okamoto served as an adviser to Japanese Prime Minister Ryutaro Hashimoto from 1996 to 1998. Hashimoto appointed Okamoto as the head of issues related to the island of Okinawa. Okamoto mediated negotiations between the Japanese government and the Okinawa Prefecture's government over issues affecting the island, including the economy and the proposed relocation of the Marine Corps Air Station Futenma.

Okamoto was also an advisor to Prime Minister Junichiro Koizumi from 2003 until 2004. Under Koizumi, Okamoto oversaw preparations for Japan's reconstruction efforts following the 2003 invasion of Iraq.

Okamoto was appointed to an advisory panel which helped draft Prime Minister Shinzo Abe's speech marking the 70th anniversary of the end of World War II in 2015. Abe ultimately did not include a new apology, but did uphold past condolences issued by previous Japanese governments.

He taught at Ritsumeikan University and other Japanese universities. He was also appointed as a senior research fellow at the MIT Center for International Studies at the Massachusetts Institute of Technology. Okamoto, who was fluent in English, continued to lobby for close American and Japanese bilateral relations, as well as Japan's foreign policy positions on the world stage. He appeared in interviews and gave public lectures in both countries. He also authored articles, books, and op-eds, including in the New York Times.

Okamoto died from pneumonia caused by COVID-19 at a Tokyo hospital on 24 April 2020, during the COVID-19 pandemic in Japan, at the age of 75.

Richard Armitage described Okamoto as the giant of the relationship between Japan and the US, Joseph Nye made the comment that Yukio Okamoto was personally his good friend and an advocate of the relationship between Japan and the US and James Auer, professor at Vanderbilt University and recipient of the Order of the Rising Sun, Gold Rays with Neck Ribbon, told that Okamoto was an intelligent and elegant person.
