= Tran Van Tho =

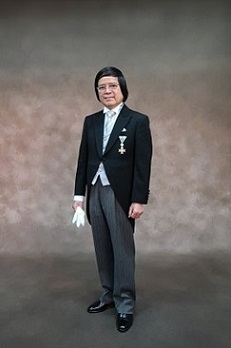
- Born: 1949 (age 76–77); Quảng Nam Province, French Indochina

Academic background
- Education: Hitotsubashi University (Ph.D.); Hitotsubashi University (B.A.)

Academic work
- Discipline: International economics, development economists, Economy of Asia
- Institutions: Waseda University
- Awards: Asian Pacific Award (1993), the Order of Sacred Treasure, Gold Rays with Rosette (2018)

Trần Văn Thọ (born in Quảng Nam Province, Vietnam) is a Vietnamese former economic advisor to the Japanese government, head of a major Japanese bank’s ODA assessment committee, and a professor of economics at the faculty of Social Sciences of Waseda University in Japan.

== Biography ==
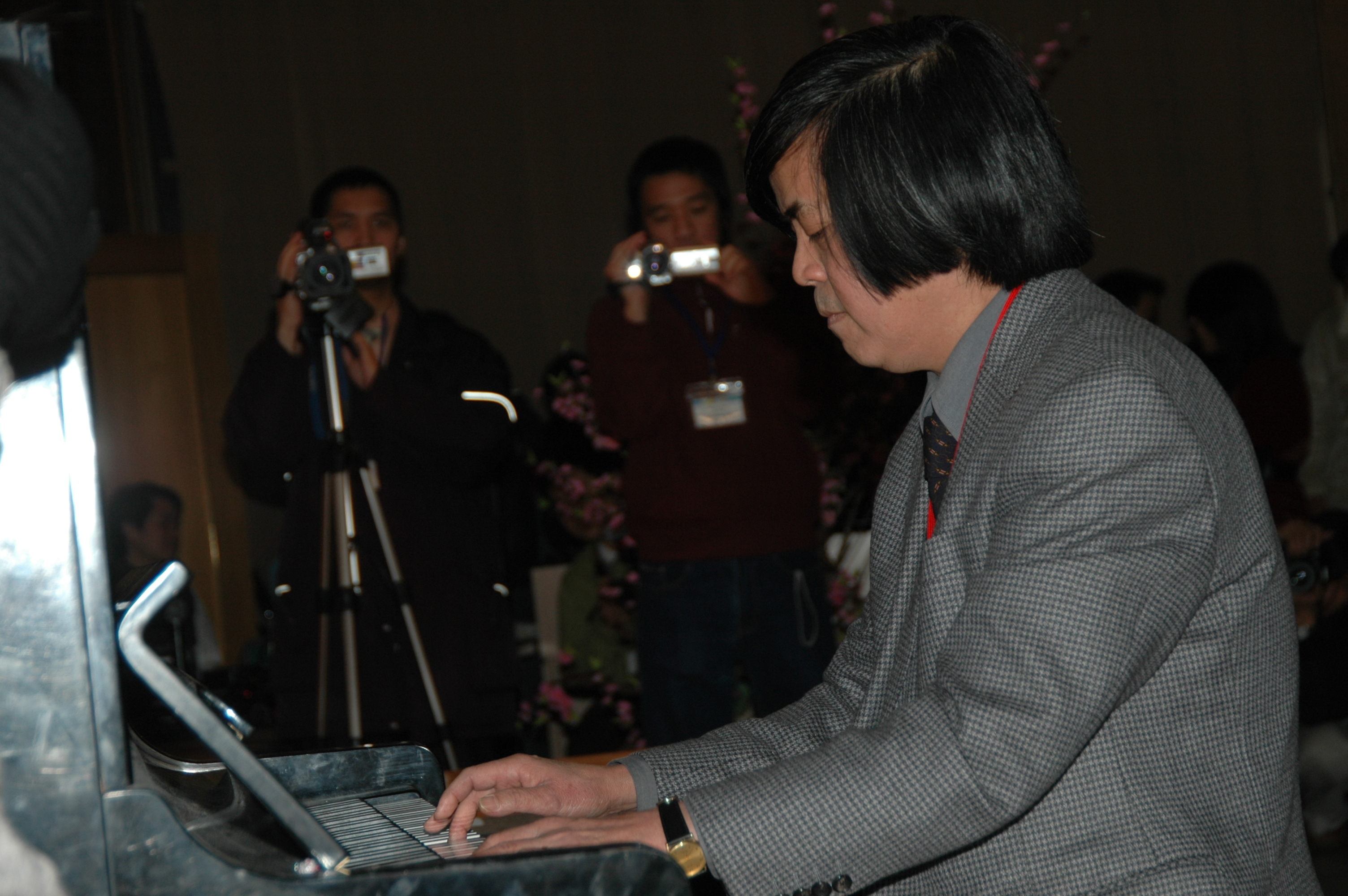
(2008)

=== Early life ===
He was born in 1949 in a poor village in the central Quảng Nam Province.

=== Academic career ===
He came to Japan in 1968 on a Japanese government scholarship. He attended Tokyo's Hitotsubashi University to study economics. Hitotsubashi University has a reputation as a leading university in economics. He graduated with a B.A. in Economics in 1973, and earned a M.A. in 1975 in the same institute. In 1993, he obtained a doctorate from Hitotsubashi University (Ph.D. in Economics).

He worked at Japan Center for Economic Research(JCER), became an assistant professor, then professor at Obirin University in Tokyo. In 1990 the Japanese government, for the first time, named three foreigners to the Economic Council of Japan, which advises the prime minister. Tho was one of them and he served for nearly 10 years on the council. In 2000, after completing his term, he was appointed professor at Waseda University.

== Activity ==
In 1993 he was invited to be a member of an economic body advising Vietnamese Prime Minister Võ Văn Kiệt. Later he was on a policy research team under Kiet’s successor Phan Văn Khải. It was then that he called for eliminating paperwork and bureaucracy, recruiting state officials on merit, setting up a level playing ground for foreign and domestic investors and for private and state-owned enterprises. He also advised the government to compile a “negative list” with entrepreneurs allowed to involve in any activity not finding a place in it. He also criticized the indiscriminate award of doctorates which, thus, held little value. Calling for the revocation of a regulation prohibiting Communist Party members from doing business, he said officials should be allowed to open private companies and engage in business. This has since been seriously considered.

In 1997 he published a book in Vietnamese, Industrializing Vietnam in the Age of the Asia-Pacific, and again in 2005, East Asian Economic Upheavals and the Road to Industrialization for Vietnam. In 2003 the Japan Bank for International Cooperation invited him to be the head of its ODA project assessment committee for developing infrastructure in northern Vietnam. Tho initiated the founding of the Vietnam Asia-Pacific Economic Center in Vietnam of which he is now chairman.

In 2018, at age 69, Professor Tran Van Tho was awarded the Order of Sacred Treasure, Gold Rays with Rosette in recognition of his contributions to the development of economic ties between Japan and Vietnam, deepening the country’s understanding of Japan.

He retains his Vietnamese citizenship.
