= James Kondo =

Japanese businessperson

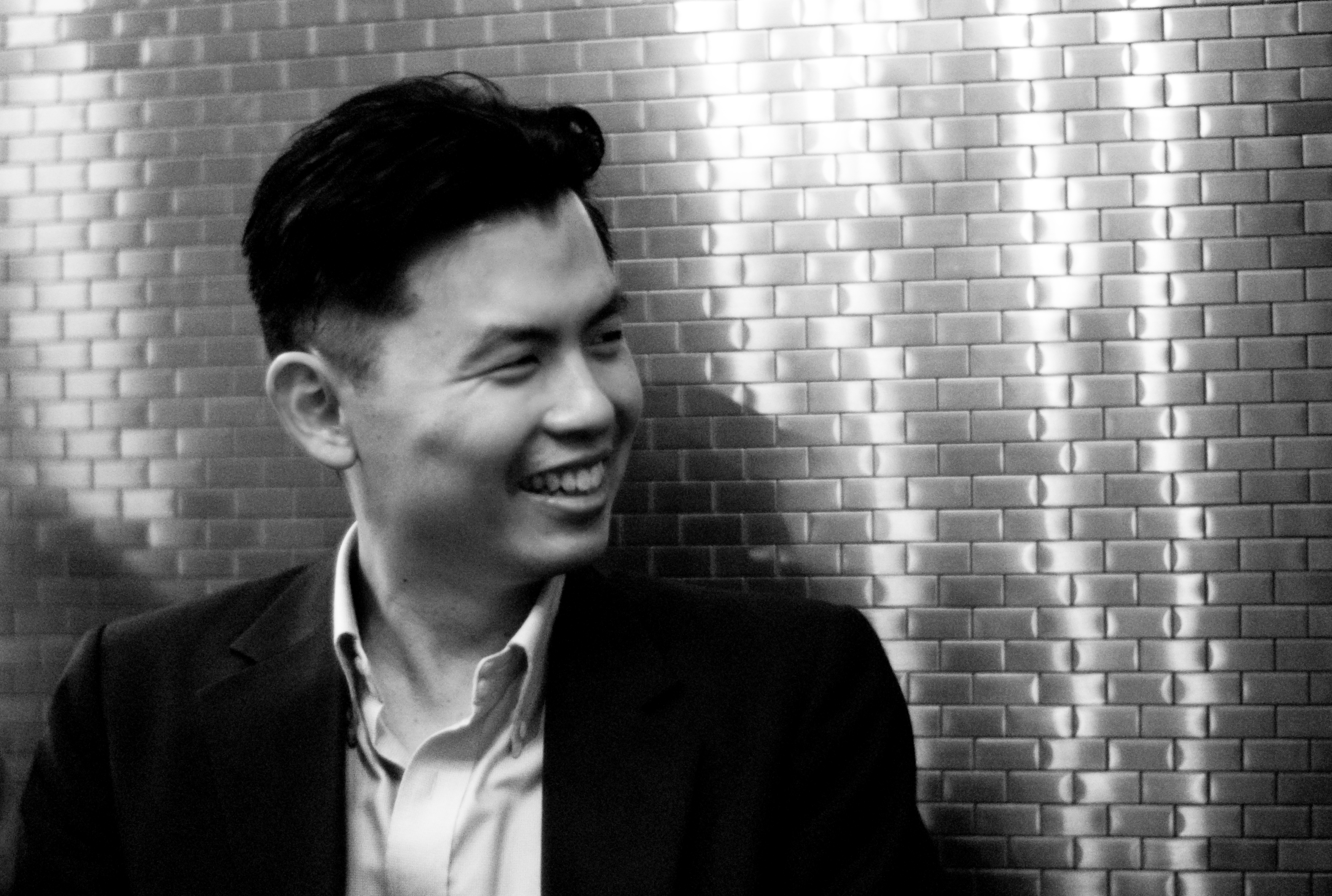
- Born: 9 December 1967 (age 58)
- Education: Keio University; Harvard Business School; Yale University

James Kondo (近藤 正晃ジェームス Kondo Masaakira James, born December 9, 1967) is an executive whose career spans social, technology, government, business and academic sectors. From January 2019, he is Chairman of International House of Japan.

== Biography ==
=== Education ===
After graduating from Keio High School, Kondo studied at Brown University, graduated from Keio University with a BA in Economics and Harvard Business School with an MBA. He is also a Yale World Fellow at Yale University.

=== Social sector ===
On January 1, 2019, Kondo was appointed as Chairman at International House of Japan after serving as a Trustee and a Director in previous years.
He also serves as a Global Trustee of Asia Society and Co-Chair of Asia Society Japan Center. He is also a Kenjin-Tatsujin Member of nonprofit organization Ashinaga.
In 2011, he co-founded Beyond Tomorrow, a global fund for educational assistance to support youth in need, offering scholarship programs mainly focused on leadership training. It first began as an educational fund supporting young victims of 2011 Tohoku disaster. In 2007, Kondo co-founded a nonprofit organization TABLE FOR TWO International with fellow Young Global Leaders from World Economic Forum.

=== Technology ===
Kondo serves as Co-Chair of Silicon Valley Japan Platform which connects business leaders in Silicon Valley and Japan.
He also serves as Representative Director at World Economic Forum Centre for the Fourth Industrial Revolution Japan which is one of four global centres set up in the world to help shape governance for new technologies that are transforming our world.
He also serves as Senior Advisor at Geodesic Capital.
Previously, Kondo served as Chairman of Twitter Japan and Vice President of Twitter Inc.

=== Government and policy ===
Kondo co-founded Asia Pacific Initiative in 2011, and has been serving as a board member and President.
Previously in 2010, he joined the Government of Japan and served in various capacities as Counsellor at the Prime Minister's Office. From 2011 to 2012, he became a Special Adviser to the Cabinet Office.
He was a management consultant at McKinsey & Company for fifteen years from 1990 where he served as a core member of the firm's global strategy group and its economic think tank, McKinsey Global Institute. He co-founded Health and Global Policy Institute (HGPI) in 2004 and served as Vice Chairman and President until 2009.

=== Academia ===
Kondo is a visiting professor at Hitotsubashi University Business School conducting Business Government and International Economy course since 2011.
He joined MIT Media Lab as a visiting scientist from 2014 to 2017.
In 2003, Kondo joined University of Tokyo where he co-established Healthcare and Social Policy Program (HSP) and served as a Co-Director until 2009.
From July 2019, Kondo is a visiting professor at Department of Health Policy and Management, Keio University School of Medicine.

== Awards ==
- New Asian Leader (2003), World Economic Forum
- Young Global Leader (2005), World Economic Forum
- Global Agenda Council member, World Economic Forum
- US-Japan Leadership Program Delegate (2005-2006), The United States-Japan Foundation
- Asia 21 Fellow (2006), Asia Society
- International Fellow, Center for Strategic and International Studies
- Inamori Fellow (2006), Inamori Foundation
- Richard von Weizsäcker Fellow (2016), Robert Bosch Academy
