= Hiroshi Koike =

Japanese director

- 小池博史
- Born: January 25, 1956 (age 70); Hitachi, Ibaraki, Japan
- Occupation: Director
- Writing career
- Language: Japanese
- Notable work: Ship in a View (1997); WD (2001); Heat of GOLD~One Hundred Years of Solitude (2005); The Mahabharata (2021)
- Website: kikh.com

Hiroshi Koike (小池博史 Koike Hiroshi born on 25 January 1956, in Japan) is a Japanese director, playwright and choreographer. After his former performing arts company Pappa TARAHUMARA was dissolved in 2012, he formed the Hiroshi Koike Bridge Project (HKBP). In June, 2023, they added the word, Odyssey, to the organization's name to reflect the director's vision of creating art - Hiroshi Koike Bridge Project -Odyssey.

He has conducted physical acting training workshops based on his original method titled “slow movement” all over the world. Up to date, Hiroshi Koike has directed 55 works with Pappa TARAHUMARA and 36 works with Hiroshi Koike Bridge Project -Odyssey.

== Early life and career ==
Koike was born in Hitachi-shi, Ibaraki. When he came to Tokyo, in order to take a college entrance examination for the department of architecture, he was shocked when he saw a film directed by Federico Fellini. That experience led Koike to pursue film making. While studying sociology at Hitotsubashi University, he started to produce a play, rather than a film, because he was told that "movies and theater are the same" by his friends, and ended up hosting a student theater company.

After graduating from university, he worked as a TV director of documentary programs, but left the company after two years. In 1982, he founded Pappa TARAHUMARA with Ogawa Mariko and other friends from college. In 1995, Koike established a school for performing arts, PAI, of which he is the president. Koike was involved in all 55 productions of the group as the director, playwright, and choreographer for 30 years until 2012.

After the 2011 Tōhoku earthquake and tsunami, he decided to dissolve the group in 2012; Koike claimed feeling trapped by Japan and Japanese cultural administration spurred his decision. In the same year, the group held the Papa-Tara Final Festival. In June, soon after the dissolution of Pappa TARAHUMARA, he established the Hiroshi Koike Bridge Project (HKBP). From 2013 through 2021, HKBP produced a theatrical adaptation of the ancient epic Mahabharata with artists from various Asian countries. Other productions of HKBP include The Restaurant of Many Orders, which is based on Kenji Miyazawa's novel, World Series, and The Phoenix Project. The Phoenix Project is a series of 4 new productions created and performed in Poland, Malaysia, Brazil and Japan. Koike's productions tackle what it means to be a human being and how to live in harmony with the world and each other.

Koike's productions have been highly acclaimed worldwide and have been invited by several international festivals and theaters such as the Next Wave Festival at the Brooklyn Academy of Music. Koike's works have been performed in 40 countries. In addition to his work with many international artists and productions all over the world, he has also conducted workshops for professional artists and citizens.

Koike has served Tsukuba Art Center as the artistic director from 1997 to 2004, the Asian Performing Arts Forum as a member of the executive committee in 1998, and Japan Foundation as the member of the Special Donation Council from 2005 to 2011.

== Slow movement ==
By converting every movement to a speed of 1/100 or less of the daily speed and communicating in a slow movement, it is said to deepen the awareness of one's "body"; this method is called "slow movement". From the idea that "the brain that thinks and the mind that feels, the internal organs and muscles, the arms, the legs, the head, etc. are all included in the 'body', 'feel the whole' body 'and feel others and things'". In addition, based on this method, many workshops for professionals and citizens are held in Japan and overseas.

== Major works ==
=== Pappa TARAHUMARA ===
- 1982 In Honor of the Fragile Thing
- 1983 Opera in the Dark, La Mangeuse – The Woman Who Eats, Typo – A Life in 5,400 Seconds
- 1984 Sleep in the Sun, The Black Solar Game, Colors’ Dance
- 1985 Mary in Blue, Picnic on the Shore
- 1986 MONK
- 1987 Pocket of Fever, ALEJO – To Praise the Wind
- 1988 Zoo of the Sea
- 1989 Parade
- 1991 Stone Age
- 1992 The Bush of Ghost
- 1994 AO-Blue
- 1995 Archeology of MACBETH
- 1996 KUSAMEIKYU – Water Moon Mirror Flower *collaborative project with Zuni
- 1997 SHIP IN A VIEW, Island
- 1998 Spring Day
- 2001 WD, Love Letter
- 2002 Birds on Board, The Sound of Future SYNC
- 2003 Blue Brain Bull, Street of Crocodiles Project 1, Spring in Kuala Lumpur
- 2005 Three Sisters, Heart of Gold-One Hundred Years of Solitude
- 2006 My Blue Sky, Pappa TARAHUMARA's "Cinderella"
- 2007 Tokyo⇔Buenos Aires LETTERS
- 2008 New “Cinderella”, Gulliver& Swift-Writer Jonathan Swift's Cat Cooking Recipes-
- 2009 Garibaba's strange World, Punk Don Quixote
- 2010 Nobody, NO BODY, Swift sweets, Snow White
- 2011 Between the Line

=== Hiroshi Koike Bridge Project ===
- 2012 The Restaurant of Many Orders
- 2013 Mahabharata Part 1
- 2014 Milky Way Train, Odyssey of Wind
- 2015 Mahabharata Part 2, Mahabharata Part 2.5
- 2016 Mahabharata Part 3
- 2017 World Conference, Mahabharata Part 4
- 2018 2030 World Drifting, Strawberry Fields
- 2019 Vagabond~SAKURAGAWA, Endless BRIDGE~The Mahabharata, Fools on the Hill
- 2020 Seven Nights' Dream
- 2021 The Mahabharata~Chapter of Desire/Chapter of Tempest
- 2022 KOSMOS (coproduction with Grotowski Institute)
- 2023 WE - Entrance and World's Exit
- 2023 SOUL of Odyssey (coproduction with Kuala Lumpur Shakespeare Players)
- 2024 N/KOSMOS (coproduction with Grotowski Institute)
- 2024 Breath TRIPLE
- 2024 Saudade in the MIRAGE (coproduction with Sesc Sao Paulo)
- 2024 Soul of ODYSSEY - Originally premiered in Kuala Lumpur in 2023, the production was re-staged with a new direction in Tokyo in 2024

== Publications ==
- Long Goodbye – Pappa TARAHUMARA and Its Era (Seigensha Art Publishing, 2011)
- Listen to the Body (Shinchosha, 2013)
- What's Performing Arts? (Suiseisha, 2017)
- The Journey to the Night and the End of the World – The Collection Book of Hiroshi Koike's Works (Suiseisha, 2017)
