= Graduate School of International Corporate Strategy =

Graduate business school in Japan

Coordinates: 35.692442°N 139.758056°E

Hitotsubashi University Graduate School of International Corporate Strategy (ICS)
- 一橋大学大学院 国際企業戦略研究科
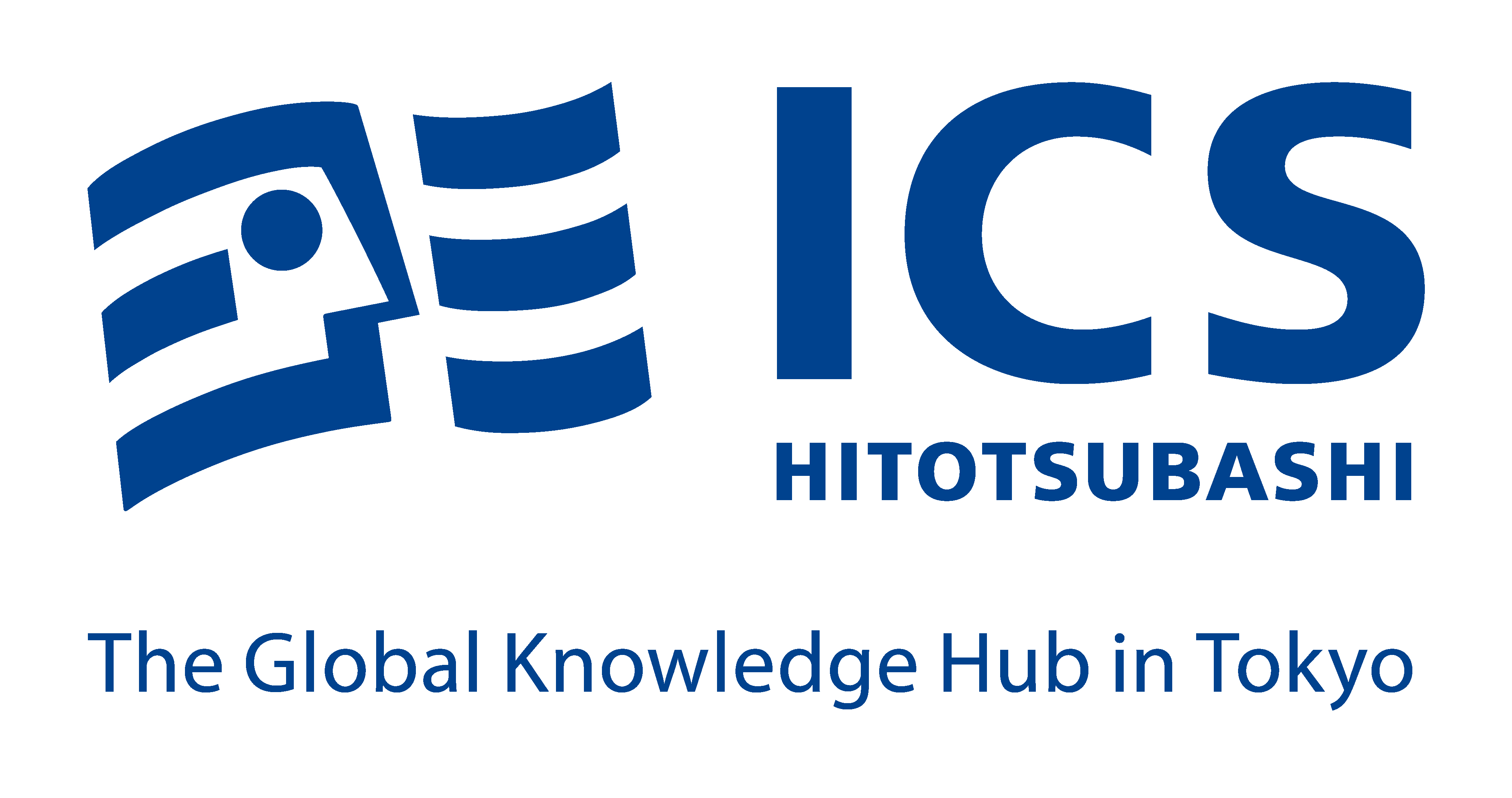
- Latin: Hitotsubashi Daigaku — Daigakuin Kokusai Kigyō Senryaku Kenkyūka
- Other names: Hitotsubashi University Business School (一橋大学ビジネススクール, Hitotsubashi Daigaku Bijinesu Sukūru)
- Type: Public
- Established: 1998
- Dean: Emi Osono
- Faculty: 40
- Undergraduates: No
- Postgraduates: ~800
- Location: Tokyo, Japan
- Campus: Urban
- Website: ics.hub.hit-u.ac.jp

The Hitotsubashi University Business School (大学院 国際企業戦略研究科, Daigakuin Kokusai Kigyō Senryaku Kenkyūka; Graduate School of International Corporate Strategy), also known as Hitotsubashi ICS, is the graduate business school of Hitotsubashi University in Tokyo, Japan. Hitotsubashi ICS was the first "professional graduate school" (formerly "specialized graduate school") established in Japan. The school was founded by Harvard Business School professor Hirotaka Takeuchi, its first dean, in 1998, and admitted students in 2000.

ICS is housed in the National Center of Sciences and located at Chiyoda Campus, the birthplace of Hitotsubashi University, Chiyoda, Tokyo.

== Programs ==
Hitotsubashi ICS has three programs: International Business Strategy MBA, EMBA and DBA.

=== MBA Program ===
The first full-time MBA program offered by a Japanese national university taught entirely in English. Students can apply for either a one-year program or a two-year program. Hitotsubashi ICS' students have access to Japan's real business network, as well as to the Global Network for Advanced Management. Hitotsubashi ICS was recently ranked as the No. 1 Business School in Japan by QS Rankings.

=== EMBA Program ===
The EMBA is 1-year, all-English language, part-time program. The EMBA class also takes three one-week immersion trips outside Japan.

=== DBA Program ===
The school offers a flexible DBA degree, which is completed over three years or more and can be done while working.

== Teaching Staff ==
- Ikujiro Nonaka (Professor Emeritus)
- Hirotaka Takeuchi (Founding Dean)
- Kazuo Ichijo (retired)
- Ryuji Yasuda
- Sherman Abe (retired)
- Saburo Kobayashi
- Norihiko Shimizu
- Hiroshi Ono
- James Kondo
- Shingo Oue
- Tish Robinson
- Kangyong Sun
- Kentaro Koga
- Michael Korver
- Emi Osono (dean)
- Erica Okada
- Tomonori Ito
- Ken Kusunoki
- Takashi Nawa
- Yoshinori Fujikawa
- Satoshi Akutsu

== Alliances and Partnerships ==
=== BEST Alliance ===
Hitotsubashi ICS is one of the three founding member institutions of the BEST Alliance program (BEST = BEijing, Seoul, Tokyo), which is sponsored by the governments of China, South Korea and Japan to encourage trilateral exchange of students and increased cooperation in higher education in East Asia. The BEST Alliance grant will support activities associated with the BEST Business School Alliance between Hitotsubashi ICS, Peking University’s Guanghua School of Management and Seoul National University’s Graduate School of Business. The students who participate in the double degree program will spend their 1st year in their home institution, and 2nd year in the host institution (6 months in the case of SNU). Upon completion, the students will receive an MBA degree from both institutions.

=== Global Network for Advanced Management ===
Hitotsubashi ICS is a member of the Global Network for Advanced Management (GNAM), which is a collaboration of graduate schools of business.

=== Partner schools ===
==== America ====
- Drucker School of Management, Claremont Graduate University (Claremont, CA, USA)
- Darden School of Business, University of Virginia (Charlottesville, VA, USA)
- Kellogg School of Management, Northwestern University (Evanston, IL, USA)
- Shidler College of Business, University of Hawai’i at Mānoa (Honolulu, HI, USA)
- Yale School of Management, Yale University (New Haven, CT, USA)
- EGADE Business School, Tecnológico de Monterrey (Monterrey, Mexico)
- INCAE Business School (Alajuela, Costa Rica)

==== Europe ====
- CEU Business School, Central European University (Budapest, Hungary)
- London Business School, University of London (London, UK)
- ESADE Business School, Ramon Llull University (Barcelona, Spain)
- UiS Business School, University of Stavanger (Stavanger, Norway)
- Koç University Graduate School of Business (Istanbul, Turkey)
- IE Business School (Madrid, Spain)

==== Asia ====
- Guanghua School of Management, Peking University (Beijing, China)
- School of Business, Renmin University of China (Beijing, China)
- CUHK Business School, The Chinese University of Hong Kong (Hong Kong, China)
- Graduate School of Business, Seoul National University (Seoul, South Korea)
