= Hiroshi Mizuta =

Japanese economist, historian of social thought and activist (1919–2023)

- 水田洋
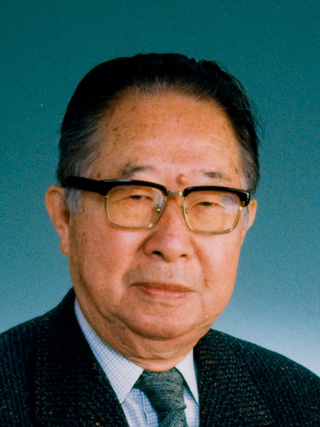
- Born: 3 September 1919; Tokyo, Japan
- Died: 3 February 2023 (aged 103); Nagoya, Aichi Prefecture, Japan

Hiroshi Mizuta (Japanese: 水田洋; 3 September 1919 – 3 February 2023) was a Japanese economist, historian of social thought and activist. An emeritus professor of Nagoya University and a member of the Japan Academy, he is best known as a leading scholar of Adam Smith.

== Life and career ==
Born in Tokyo, Mizuna graduated from the Hitotsubashi University (at the time Tokyo University of Commerce) in 1942. Known as "the fighting researcher" for his activism, he was a pioneer in feminist studies, served as chairman of the anti-war association Japan War Veterans Memorial Association (Wadatsumi-kai), and was a loud critic of major investments in expensive projects such as Olympics and Expos, among other things founding the Citizens' Association Against the Nagoya Olympics to oppose the Nagoya bid for the 1988 Summer Olympics.

Mizuna published research papers and books up to 2021, when he was already 102 years old. Together with Yoshihiko Uchida and Noboru Kobayashi, he is considered one of the three leading scholars of Adam Smith in Japan. The Nagoya University, where he taught and was professor emeritus, named an award for young researchers after him, the Mizuta Prize, and established the Mizuta Collection, a library catalogue of his writings.

Hospitalized from October 2022, Mizuna died on 3 February 2023, at the age of 103.
