= Makoto Taniguchi =

Japanese diplomat and academic (1930–2024)

Makoto Taniguchi (谷口 誠, Taniguchi Makoto; 31 March 1930 – 14 January 2024) was a Japanese diplomat and academic who was Ambassador of Japan to the United Nations and Chairman of UNICEF in 1988.

== Early life ==
Makoto Taniguchi was born on 31 March 1930. He received a B.A. and an M.A. from Hitotsubashi University, and then earned a B.A. at St John's College, Cambridge in 1959.

== Diplomatic career ==
Taniguchi joined the Japanese Ministry of Foreign Affairs in 1959, and served in international organizations including the United Nations, GATT and the OECD.

He was Ambassador of Japan to the United Nations from 1986 to 1989. In this capacity, he was also Vice Chairman (1987–1988) and Chairman (1988) of the UNICEF Executive Board at the international level.

He was Deputy Secretary-General of OECD from 1990 to 1996.

== Academic career ==
After retiring from the diplomatic service, Taniguchi became a professor in the Institute of Asia-Pacific Studies at Waseda University.

== Death ==
Taniguchi died from heart failure on 14 January 2024, at the age of 93.
