= Kunio Egashira =

Japanese businessman (1937–2008)

Kunio Egashira (江頭 邦雄, Egashira Kunio, October 1, 1937 – April 7, 2008) was the Japanese chairman of Ajinomoto, a Japanese food company which specializes in seasoning and flavorings.

Egashira was born in Nagasaki Prefecture and graduated from Hitotsubashi University with a degree in economics.

Egashira became president of Ajinomoto in June 1997. He pushed through a very aggressive array of business reforms as president. He realigned Ajinomoto to focus on growth areas within the food industry, with an emphasis on amino acid technology.

Egashira became president following a scandal at the company. His predecessor stepped down as president to take over the managerial responsibility at Ajinomoto. Two company officials were indicted for making illegal payments to corporate racketeers.

Egashira became chairman of the company in June 2005.

Kunio Egashira died on April 7, 2008, of pancreatic cancer at the age of 70.
