= Japan Bible Seminary =

Evangelical Christian seminary in Tokyo, Japan

Coordinates: 35.7682°N 139.2990°E

Japan Bible Seminary (Japanese: 聖書宣教会) is an evangelical Christian seminary located in Hamura, Tokyo.

The seminary was founded in 1958 in Suginami, Tokyo by Junichi Funiki and Akira Hatori. It moved to Hamura, Tokyo in 1989.

== Notable faculty ==
- Yoshiyuki Muchiki – the principal and Old Testament scholar
- David Toshio Tsumura – Old Testament scholar and research professor of Old Testament

== Notable alumni ==
- Sueo Oshima – A scholar of Karl Barth
- Kazuhiko Uchida – noted Christian author and pastor and former dean of Japan Bible Seminary
- Yoshiyuki Muchiki – Old Testament scholar and the principal of Japan Bible Seminary.
- Yoshinobu Endo – He was a noted Christian author and Old Testament.
