= Lee Dong-hwan (diplomat) =

South Korean diplomat, civil servant, and businessman

Lee Dong-hwan (Korean: 이동환; Hanja: 李東煥, Japanese:Moriyama Tatsuo (森山 辰雄), May 19, 1916 – November 11, 1991) was a South Korean government official, diplomat, and businessman. Lee served as vice-minister in the Japanese Home Ministry, as a Postal and Telecommunications officer for the Gangwon Province (Note: The province would later be split into Kangwon Province, North Korea, and Gangwon Province, South Korea) in the Government-General of Chōsen. Later, he served as a chief representative to the Japanese government and as a South Korean diplomat to Australia. He worked towards the normalization of post-war relationships between Japan and South Korea.

== Life ==
Lee was born on May 19, 1916, in Tanchon, Kankyōnan Province, Korea, Empire of Japan. He attended the Keijo Higher Commercial School, graduating in 1940. Lee then studied at the Tokyo University of Commerce, which he graduated from in 1942. He died on November 11, 1991.
