= RxAll =

Organization

RxAll Inc.
- Type: Private
- Industry: Medical Technology
- Founded: January 1, 2016; 10 years ago
- Headquarters: 165 Whitney Avenue, New Haven, Connecticut 06520, United States.
- Area served: Worldwide
- Key people: Adebayo Alonge (founder / CEO); Amy Kao (Co-founder / CMO); Wei Liu (Co-founder / CTO)
- Products: Medical Devices
- Total equity: 3.3 Million US dollar.
- Website: www.rxall.net/about-us rxalldelivered.com

RxAll Inc. is a health information technology and big data startup company. The company works with drug regulatory agencies and other stakeholders to reduce fake medicines and ensure that patients receive and have better access to high quality verified drugs.

== Founding history ==
RxAll Inc. was established on January 1, 2016, by Yale University - Yale School of Management graduate students Adebayo Alonge, Amy Kao and Wei Liu. It is seen as an important weapon against illegal pharmaceutical outfits in Kenya. Alonge was nearly killed by fake salbutamol tablets in Nigeria in 2005.

== Early challenges ==
Like many start-ups, RxAll Inc. came up against early challenges when it almost ran out of cash in the first quarter of 2017, the founding team persisted to raise funds in parallel to operating the business. Co-founders Adebayo Alonge and Amy Kao managed to raise about $1 million in grants and bootstrapped funds from the Nigerian government, the Yale start-up ecosystem, Merck, Villgro and other support networks.

== Products ==
=== RxScanner ===
RxScanner is a handheld drug authenticator device created for patients to verify their drugs and help drug regulators to reduce administrative burden, improve record keeping and also improved productivity and successful prosecution of bad actors. The device is in use by country FDAs, Hospitals, Pharmacies and Big Pharma across the world.

It uses AI-enabled spectroscopy to analyse a drugs molecular fingerprint and instantly verify its authenticity. It was designed to combat preventable deaths due to counterfeit pharmaceuticals.

It can work without internet access and delivers results via a mobile app, which makes it available for use in hospitals, pharmacies and regulatory agencies. It has been adopted in pilot programs in Nigeria, Kenya and India.

=== RxAll POS ===
RxAll POS is a Point of sale software created for Pharmacies in growth market that enables complete automation of the pharmacy management system.

=== RxAll Delivered ===
RxAll Delivered is a drug delivery platform that enable pharmacies and patients order verified drugs online for offline delivery at wholesale prices.

The company gained market entry into East Africa (Kenya and Uganda), West Africa (Nigeria and Ghana), Southeast Asia (Myanmar, Malaysia and Singapore), and the Americas (Canada, United States and Colombia).

== Award ==
RxAll Inc. won the 2019 BNP Paribas group deep tech award otherwise known as Hello Tomorrow, a competition crafted for tech innovators and entrepreneurs, worth €100,000.
