= Kiyama Station =

Kiyama Station is the name of two train stations in Japan:

- Kiyama Station (Saga) (基山駅)
- Kiyama Station (Fukui) (気山駅)
