= Ichiro Nakayama =

Japanese economist (1898–1980)

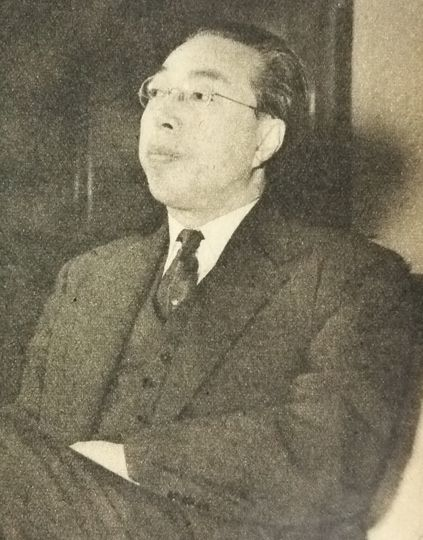
Ichiro Nakayama in 1952

Ichiro Nakayama (中山 伊知郎, Nakayama Ichirō; September 20, 1898 – April 9, 1980) was a Japanese economist. He graduated from The Tokyo University of Commerce (now Hitotsubashi University) in 1926, and then studied under Joseph Schumpeter in Germany. He was a pioneer of mathematical economics in Japan. After serving as assistant at The Tokyo University of Commerce, he became an assistant professor in 1933, a professor in 1937 and president in 1949 at the same institution. He became Chairman of Central Labor Relations Commission of Japan in 1950, and served as the first Chairman of The Tax Commission of Japan from 1959 to 1965. In 1965 he was appointed as a professor emeritus of Hitotsubashi University. In 1968, he was recognized as a Person of Cultural Merit, and was appointed a Grand Cordon of the Order of the Rising Sun on 3 November 1974.
