= Ichirō Komatsu =

Japanese diplomat, civil servant and politician

- 小松 一郎
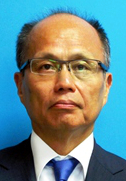

Director General of Cabinet Legislation Bureau
- In office 8 August 2013 – 16 May 2014
- Prime Minister: Shinzo Abe
- Preceded by: Tsuneyuki Yamamoto
- Succeeded by: Yusuke Yokobatake

Personal details
- Born: 8 March 1951 Kobe, Japan
- Died: 23 June 2014 (aged 63) Suginami, Tokyo, Japan
- Education: Hitotsubashi University

Ichirō Komatsu (小松 一郎, Komatsu Ichirō; 8 March 1951 – 23 June 2014) was a Japanese diplomat, civil servant and politician.

== Education and career ==
He studied at Seiko Gakuin Junior and Senior High School. After passing the foreign affairs public service class I examination (=diplomat recruitment examination), he dropped out of Hitotsubashi University's Faculty of Law after three years and entered the Ministry of Foreign Affairs in 1972. He was appointed the Director-General of the Cabinet Legislation Bureau, a highly influential post, by Prime Minister Shinzo Abe in August 2013. The Cabinet Legislation Bureau advises Cabinet members on laws and legal matters, studies legislation, and determines how the government should interpret the Constitution of Japan. He stepped down from the position in May 2014 due to declining health from cancer. Komatsu had previously served as Japan's ambassador to France, Switzerland and Liechtenstein earlier in his career.

Born in 1951, Komatsu graduated from Hitotsubashi University. He joined the Ministry of Foreign Affairs and served as the ministry's director-general for international legal affairs.

Prime Minister Shinzo Abe unilaterally appointed Komatsu as Director-General of the Cabinet Legislation Bureau in August 2013. Komatsu was the first Foreign Ministry official to be appointed to the post. Abe and Komatsu shared similar beliefs that Japan's pacifist Constitution should be revised to allow for more military involvement overseas. Komatsu supported Abe's efforts to skirt Article 9 of the Japanese Constitution to increase Japan's security role on the international stage.

Ichiro Komatsu died from cancer on 23 June 2014, at the age of 63.
