= David Toshio Tsumura =

- Born: Tsumura Toshio; February 4, 1944 (age 82); Kobe, Hyōgo Prefecture, Japan
- Occupations: Dean of Faculty and professor of Old Testament professor of Japan Bible Seminary
- Board member of: Chairman of the Tokyo Museum of Biblical Archaeology

Academic background
- Education: Hitotsubashi University, Asbury Theological Seminary
- Alma mater: Brandeis University (Ph.D.)

Academic work
- Discipline: Biblical studies, Japanese linguist
- Sub-discipline: Old Testament studies
- Institutions: Harvard University; University of Michigan; University of Tsukuba; Japan Bible Seminary
- Main interests: Old Testament
- Notable works: The First Book of Samuel (NICOT)

David Toshio Tsumura (津村 俊夫, Tsumura Toshio; born February 4, 1944) is a linguist, Old Testament scholar, dean of faculty, and professor of Old Testament professor at Japan Bible Seminary. His degrees are: a M.Div., an M.A., and a Ph.D. He is a chairman of the Tokyo Museum of Biblical Archaeology, editor of Exegetica: Studies in Biblical Exegesis, chairman of the New Japanese Bible（新改訳）Publishing Association, and author of the volume on 1 Samuel in the New International Commentary on the Old Testament series.

He is well known as an Ugarit scholar.

== History ==
Tsumura was born in Kobe, Japan, in 1944. He graduated from Hitotsubashi University in 1966, where he majored in commerce before continuing his studies in the USA. While studying ethics, he became interested in the study of the Hebrew Bible. He applied to Asbury Theological Seminary to study for an M.Div., graduating in 1969. He then applied to Brandeis University for a research master's degree in Mediterranean Studies, which he completed in 1971. Tsumura's doctorate, also in Mediterranean Studies, was awarded by the same university in 1973 for his work on Ugarit.

After graduating from Brandeis University in 1974, he returned to Japan where he became a lecturer, and later professor, in Old Testament at Japan Bible Seminary. From 1975 to 1990, he served as Associate Professor of Semitic Linguistics at the University of Tsukuba, teaching literature and linguistics. In 1990, he returned to Japan Bible Seminary.

He is recognized as a world-wide scholar, having been a visiting scholar at Harvard Divinity School (1973-1974), the University of Michigan (1979), and Harvard University in the department of Near Eastern Studies (1994).. He was a research fellow at Tyndale House (Cambridge) from 1986 to 1988.

He has taught Old Testament several times in Hong Kong at the China Graduate School of Theology.

== Works ==
=== Thesis ===
- Tsumura, David Toshio (1969). Symbolism of the Sea in the Old Testament (M.Th.). Asbury Theological Seminary. OCLC 1000388075.
- ——— (1973). The Ugaritic Drama of the Good Gods: a philological study (Ph.D.). Brandeis University. OCLC 22753778.

=== Books ===
- ——— (1989). The Earth and Waters in Genesis 1 and 2: a linguistic investigation. Journal for the Study of the Old Testament, Supplement Series. Vol. 83. Sheffield: Sheffield Academic Press. ISBN 9781850752080. OCLC 59885960.
- ——— (2005). Creation and Destruction: A Reappraisal of the Chaoskampf Theory in the Old Testament (2nd ed.). Winona Lake, IN: Eisenbrauns. ISBN 9781575065632. OCLC 747412028.
- ——— (2007). The First Book of Samuel. New International Commentary on the Old Testament. Grand Rapids, MI: Eerdmans. ISBN 9780802823595. OCLC 76897659.
- Tsumura, David Toshio (2023). Vertical Grammar of Parallelism in Biblical Hebrew. Ancient Israel and Its Literature. Atlanta: SBL Press. ISBN 9781628374353. LCCN 2023931326. OCLC 1369598717.
