= Sumio Kobayashi =

Japanese composer (born 1982)

Sumio Kobayashi (小林純生 Kobayashi Sumio, born 29 December 1982 in Mie, Japan) is a Japanese poet and composer of contemporary classical music.

== Biography ==
He has received formal musical training, excelling with piano and solfège, since 1985. Having studied with Joji Yuasa, he won at the I.C.O.M.S. 29°Concorso Internazionale di Composizione, Gyeongsangnam-do Special Prize at Isang Yun Prize, was second place at the Toru Takemitsu Composition Award in 2013, was a finalist at Pablo Casals International Composition Competition in 2015 and won the International Composers' Competition of the European Capital of Culture Wrocław 2016. He has made appearances at festivals such as Takefu International Music Festival, Tongyeong International Music Festival, and Weimarer Frühjahrstage für zeitgenössische Musik.

== Works ==
- 2013 A Silver Note of Perfumed Moon
- 2014 Sounds from the Forests are
- 2014 Floraison d'eau
- 2015 Requiems
- 2016 Fugue - homage to Maurice Ravel
- 2016 Music by Krasnale
- 2018 Nostalghia
- 2020 Unreal Rain
