= Lee Dong-hwan (politician) =

South Korean politician (born 1966)

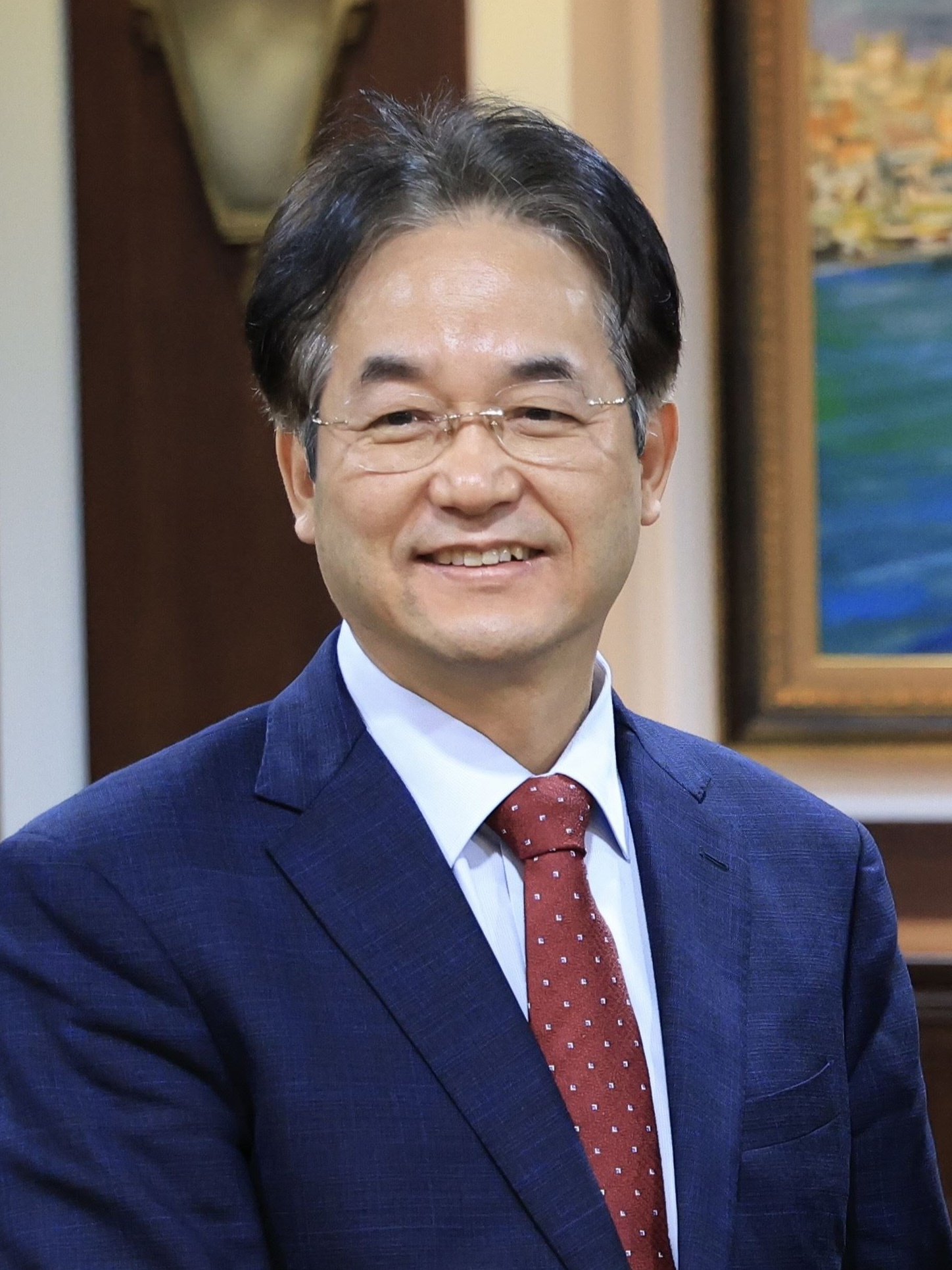
- Lee in 2025

Lee Dong-hwan (Korean: 이동환, born 1966) is a South Korean politician and current mayor of Goyang, South Korea. He was elected in 2022 as a member of the People Power Party.
