= Eiichi Sugimoto =

Japanese economist (1901–1952)

Eiichi Sugimoto (杉本 栄一, Sugimoto Eiichi; August 9, 1901 – September 24, 1952) was a Japanese economist and professor at the Tokyo University of Commerce (now Hitotsubashi University), and a pioneer of mathematical economics in Japan. He participated in the Tokuzō Fukuda Seminar, and majored in Marxist economics at the Tokyo University of Commerce and went on to study in Germany before returning to Japan.
