= Ichiro Yoshizawa =

Japanese mountain climber

Ichiro Yoshizawa (吉沢 一郎, Yoshizawa Ichirō, 1903–1998) was a Japanese mountaineer and expedition leader. He graduated from Hitotsubashi University. Among other expeditions, in 1977 he led the second successful attempt to reach the summit of K2, which saw six Japanese climbers and one Pakistani summiting on August 8-9. Yoshizawa became a member of the Japanese Alpine Club in 1925 and became vice president in 1972; he was also a member of foreign clubs like The Alpine Club.
