= Hideo Kiyama =

Japanese Sinologist (born 1934)

木山 英雄 Hideo Kiyama
- Born: 20 April 1934
- Occupation: Sinologist

Hideo Kiyama (木山 英雄, Kiyama Hideo; born 20 April 1934) is a Japanese Sinologist. He was born in Arakawa, Tokyo and graduated from the University of Tokyo.

== Selected works ==
- Beijing kujūanki: Zhou Zuoren in the Era of the Sino-Japanese War, 『北京苦住庵記 日中戦争時代の周作人』, Chikuma Shobō, Publishers, 1978
