= Ichiro Suzuki (engineer) =

Japanese automotive engineer (born 1937)

Ichiro Suzuki 鈴木 一郎
- Born: February 14, 1937 (age 89); Tokyo, Japan
- Education: Nagoya University
- Engineering career
- Discipline: Mechanical engineering
- Projects: F1 project
- Significant design: Lexus LS 400

Ichiro Suzuki (鈴木 一郎, Suzuki Ichirō; born February 14, 1937) is a Japanese automotive engineer who was responsible for the design and construction of the first Lexus LS. Born in 1937, he joined Toyota Motor Corporation shortly after graduating from Nagoya University with a degree in engineering. By the time he was placed in charge of the Lexus development effort, otherwise known as the F1 project, Suzuki had amassed 25 years of experience at the firm in multiple areas of vehicle development. Suzuki's brainchild, the LS 400, launched in 1989, laying the groundwork for the successful debut of the Lexus marque.

== Early life ==
Suzuki was born in Tokyo in 1937. Before 1941, his family had moved to the town of Tsushima, Aichi, outside Nagoya, where his father took a job at the Nisshin Flour Milling Company. In school, Suzuki proved to be a gifted student, finding schoolwork easy, particularly in the field of mathematics. As he grew older, he developed a disinterest in school lessons, leading to a pattern of truancy. Unknown to Suzuki until his high school reunion years later, his mother persuaded a teacher to excuse his absences, allowing him to graduate and enroll in Nagoya University.

== Career ==
Following graduation, Suzuki applied for a job at Toyota Motor Corporation, which had its headquarters in Nagoya. Suzuki was initially assigned to vehicle body assembly despite a professed interested in engines. Over the years, Suzuki was mentored by senior department members, and worked with teams from numerous company departments. In 1983, company chairman Eiji Toyoda initiated the F1 project, a plan to create a brand-new luxury sedan which would challenge the top models from Mercedes-Benz and BMW. Engineers Ichirō Suzuki and Shoji Jimbo were initially selected to head the development effort in 1984.

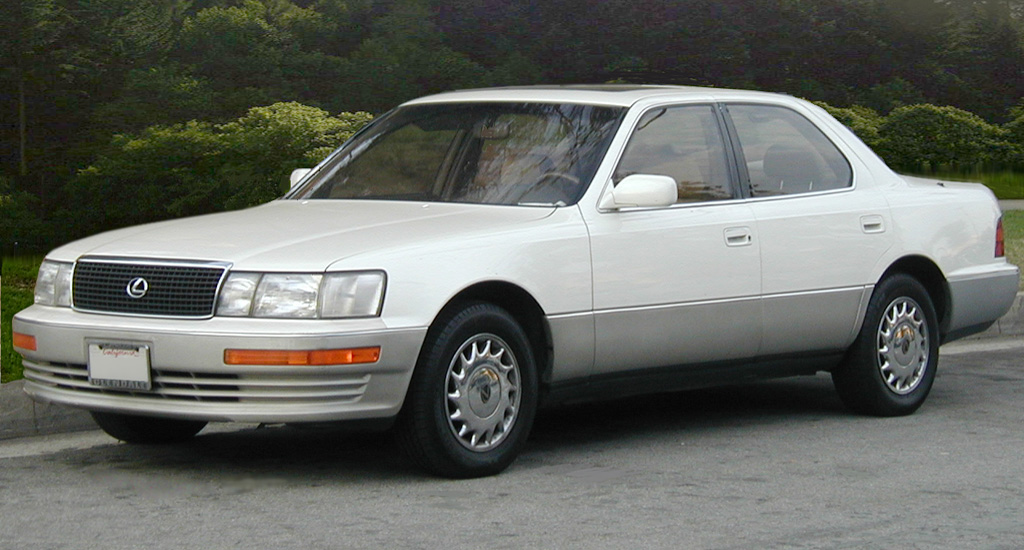
Ichirō Suzuki headed the development of the Lexus LS 400

In 1985, Suzuki sent a team of engineers to New York and California to determine the expectations of luxury consumers. His team developed a set of key criteria that their new sedan had to achieve in order to be successful in the luxury market. Suzuki also developed a series of "no-compromise goals", which were seemingly contradictory or mutually exclusive design targets (e.g. high top speed yet low fuel consumption). These goals became known as "Lexus Musts" which have since been used as benchmark standards for vehicle development within Lexus. As chief engineer, Suzuki ensured that the completed LS 400 sedan met each of the design criteria, intended to exceed rival vehicles in key aspects.

The 1989 launch of Suzuki's biggest project, the Lexus LS, proved to be a major success, with the sedan outselling rival flagship models within its first year on the market. With this achievement, Suzuki gained legendary status within the company as the "Michael Jordan of chief engineers." In 2000, Suzuki was honored with the title of gikan, or executive advisory engineer, and mentored other Lexus engineers before retiring in 2003.
