= Ronald Toby =

American historian

Ronald P. Toby (1942-2025) was an American historian, academic, writer and Japanologist.

== Early life ==
Toby earned a doctorate in Japanese history from Columbia University in 1977.

== Career ==
In 1977, Toby was appointed Visiting Assistant Professor of History at University of California at Berkeley. In 1978, he joined Department of History at the University of Illinois at Urbana Champaign as an Assistant Professor. He also taught briefly at Kyoto University in the mid-1990s and served as a Professor in the Faculty of Letters at the University of Tokyo from 2000 to 2002. In 2012, Toby retired from the University of Illinois.

Toby's academic specialization focuses on issues having to do with pre- and early-modern Japan. His book State and Diplomacy in Early Modern Japan demonstrates that during the so-called "closed country" period in the Edo era, Japan was never truly closed to the outside world.

== Select works ==
Tony's published writings encompass 52 works in 158 publications in 3 languages and 2,117 library holdings.

- 2019 — Engaging the Other: 'Japan' and Its Alter-Egos, 1550-1850 Leiden:Brill. ISBN 978-90-04-39062-1; OCLC 1066182857
- 2004 — Emergence of Economic Society in Japan, 1600-1870 with Hayami Akira and Osamu Saitō. Oxford: Oxford University Press. ISBN 9780198289050; OCLC 53388426
- 1983 — State and Diplomacy in Early Modern Japan: Asia in the Development of the Tokugawa Bakufu. Princeton: Princeton University Press. ISBN 978-0-691-05401-8; OCLC 182640041
- 1977 — The Early Tokugawa Bakufu and Seventeenth Century Japanese Relations with East Asia. Ph.D. thesis, Columbia University. OCLC 6909487
- 1974 — Korean-Japanese Diplomacy in 1711: Sukchong's Court and the Shogun's Title. M.A. thesis, Columbia University. OCLC 45788706
