= List of Marxian economists =

This is an alphabetical list of notable Marxian economists, that is, experts in the social science of economics who follow and develop Marxian economic theory. The list also includes some economic sociologists who have written from a Marxian perspective.

== List of Marxian economists ==
Name	Place of birth	Place of death	Nationality	Life
Michel Aglietta	Chambéry, France	Paris, France	(France) French	1938–2025
Li Minqi	China	–	(China) Chinese	1969–
Yevgeni Preobrazhensky	Bolkhov, Oryol, Russian Empire	Moscow, Russian Soviet Federative Socialist Republic, Soviet Union	(Soviet Union) Soviet	1886–1937
Victor Perlo	New York City, United States	Croton-on-Hudson, New York, United States	(United States) American	1912–1999
Grigory Feldman	Rostov-on-Don, Yekaterinoslav Governorate, Russian Empire		(Soviet Union) Soviet	1884–1958
Jack Amariglio	United States	–	(United States) American	1951–
Samir Amin	Cairo, Egypt	Paris, France	(Egypt) (France) Egyptian-French	1931–2018
Giovanni Arrighi	Milan, Italy	Baltimore, United States	(Italy) Italian	1937–2009
Hans-Georg Backhaus	Rudolstadt, Germany	Frankfurt, Germany	(Germany) German	1929–2026
Paul A. Baran	Mykolaiv, Russian Empire	Palo Alto, United States	(United States) American	1909–1964
Walden Bello	Cardona, Philippine Commonwealth		(Philippines) Philippine	1945–
Charles Bettelheim	Paris, France	Paris, France	(France) French	1913–2006
Thomas Bottomore	United Kingdom	Sussex, United Kingdom	(United Kingdom) British	1920–1992
Samuel Bowles	New Haven, United States	–	(United States) American	1939–
Martin Bronfenbrenner	Pittsburgh, United States	Durham, United States	(United States) American	1914–1997
Nikolai Bukharin	Moscow, Russian Empire	Kommunarka shooting ground, Soviet Union	(Soviet Union) Soviet	1888–1938
Paul Cockshott	Edinburgh, Scotland	–	(Scotland) (United Kingdom) Scottish-British	1952–
Maurice Dobb	London, United Kingdom	Unknown	(United Kingdom) British	1900–1976
Gérard Duménil		–	(France) French	1942–
Jon Elster	Oslo, Norway	–	(Norway) Norwegian	1940–
Arghiri Emmanuel	Patras, Greece	Paris, France	(Greece) (France) Greek-French	1911–2001
Ben Fine	United Kingdom	–	(United Kingdom) British	1948–
Duncan K. Foley	Columbus, United States	–	(United States) American	1942–
John Bellamy Foster	Seattle, United States	–	(United States) American	1953–
Andre Gunder Frank	Berlin, Germany	Luxembourg, Luxembourg	(Germany) (United States) German-American	1929–2005
Herbert Gintis	Philadelphia, United States	Northampton, Massachusetts	(United States) American	1940–2023
Andrew Glyn	Tetsworth, United Kingdom	Oxford, United Kingdom	(United Kingdom) British	1943–2007
David Gordon	Washington, D.C., United States	New York City, United States	(United States) American	1944–1996
David Harvey	Gillingham, Kent, United Kingdom	–	(United Kingdom) British	1935–
Rudolf Hilferding	Vienna, Austria	Paris, France	(Austria) Austrian	1887–1941
Branko Horvat	Petrinja, Kingdom of Serbs, Croats and Slovenes	Zagreb, Croatia	(Socialist Federal Republic of Yugoslavia) Yugoslav	1928–2003
Michael Hudson	Chicago, United States	–	(United States) American	1939–
Makoto Itoh	Tokyo, Japan	–	(Japan) Japanese	1936–2023
Leif Johansen	Eidsvoll, Norway	Norway	(Norway) Norwegian	1930–1982
Michał Kalecki	Łódź, Congress Poland	Warsaw, Polish People's Republic	(Poland) Polish	1899–1970
Leonid Kantorovich	Saint Petersburg, Russian Empire	Moscow, Soviet Union	(Soviet Union) Soviet	1912–1986
Edvard Kardelj	Ljubljana, Austria-Hungary	Ljubljana, Yugoslavia	(Socialist Federal Republic of Yugoslavia) Yugoslav	1910–1979
Karl Kautsky	Prague, Austrian Empire	Amsterdam, Netherlands	(Czech Republic) (Austria) Czech-Austrian	1854–1938
John Keracher	Dundee, United Kingdom	United States	(United States) American	1880–1958
Andrew Kliman	United States	–	(United States) American	1955–
David Laibman	United States	–	(United States) American	1942–
Oskar R. Lange	Tomaszów Mazowiecki, Congress Poland	London, United Kingdom	(Poland) Polish	1904–1965
Vladimir Lenin	Simbirsk, Russian Empire	Gorki, Soviet Union	(Soviet Union) Soviet	1870–1924
Alain Lipietz	Charenton-le-Pont, France	–	(France) French	1947–
Frédéric Lordon	France	–	(France) French	1962–
Adolph Lowe	Stuttgart, Germany	Wolfenbüttel, Germany	(Germany) German	1893–1995
Rosa Luxemburg	Zamość, Russian Empire	Berlin, Germany	(Poland) Polish	1871–1919
John Maclean	Pollokshaws, United Kingdom	Glasgow, United Kingdom	(United Kingdom) British	1879–1923
Yahya M. Madra	Istanbul, Turkey	–	(United States) American	1973-
Harry Magdoff	Bronx, United States	Burlington, United States	(United States) American	1913–2006
Ernest Mandel	Frankfurt, Germany	Brussels, Belgium	(Germany) German	1923–1995
Ronald L. Meek	Wellington, New Zealand	United Kingdom	(New Zealand) New Zealander	1917–1978
Michio Morishima	Osaka Prefecture, Japan	United Kingdom	(Japan) Japanese	1923–2004
Xue Muqiao	Wuxi, China	Beijing, China	(China) Chinese	1904–2005
Nobuo Okishio	Hyōgo-ku, Kobe, Japan	Japan	(Japan) Japanese	1927–2003
Konstantin Ostrovityanov	Tambov, Russian Empire	Moscow, Soviet Union	(Soviet Union) Soviet	1892–1969
Prabhat Patnaik	Jatni, India	–	(India) Indian	1945–
Utsa Patnaik	Cuttack, India	–	(India) Indian	1945–
Michael J. Piore	United States	–	(United States) American	1940–
Raúl Prebisch	San Miguel de Tucumán, Argentina	Santiago, Chile	(Argentina) Argentine	1901–1986
Helmut Reichelt	Borås, Sweden	–	(Germany) German	1939–
Stephen Resnick	United States	United States	(United States) American	1938–2013
John Roemer	Washington D.C., United States	–	(United States) American	1945–
Robert Rowthorn	Newport, Monmouthshire, United Kingdom	–	(United Kingdom) British	1939–
Isaak Illich Rubin	Dinaburg, Latvia	Aktobe, Kazakhstan	(Soviet Union) Soviet	1886–1937
Alfredo Saad-Filho	Brazil	–	(Brazil) Brazilian	1964–
Thomas T. Sekine	Japan	–	(Japan) Japanese	1933–2022
Anwar Shaikh	Karachi, British Raj	New York City, United States	(United States) American	1945–2026
Piero Sraffa	Turin, Italy	Cambridge, United Kingdom	(Italy) Italian	1898–1983
Josef Steindl	Vienna, Austria-Hungary	Vienna, Austria	(Austria) Austrian	1912–1993
Stanislav Strumilin	Dashkovtsy, Russian Empire	Moscow, Soviet Union	(Soviet Union) Soviet	1877–1974
Paul Sweezy	New York City, United States	United States	(United States) American	1910–2004
Shigeto Tsuru	Nagoya, Japan	Japan	(Japan) Japanese	1912–2006
Kozo Uno	Kurashiki, Japan	Kugenuma, Japan	(Japan) Japanese	1897–1977
Yanis Varoufakis	Athens, Greece	–	(Greece) Greek	1961–
Immanuel Wallerstein	New York City, United States	Branford, Connecticut, United States	(United States) American	1930–2019
Richard D. Wolff	Youngstown, United States	–	(United States) American	1942–
W. H. Locke Anderson	United States	United States	(United States) American	1933–2002
Maria da Conceição Tavares	Anadia, Portugal	Nova Friburgo, Brazil	(Portugal) (Brazil) Portuguese-Brazilian	1930–2024
Leda Paulani	Brazil	–	(Brazil) Brazilian	1954–
Henryk Grossman	Kraków, Austria-Hungary	Leipzig, East Germany	(Poland) (Germany) Polish-German	1881–1950
Leo Huberman	Newark, New Jersey	Paris, France	(United States) American	1903–1968
Kuruma Samezō	Okayama, Japan	Japan	(Japan) Japanese	1893–1982
Max Beer	Tarnobrzeg, Galicia, Austrian Empire	London, United Kingdom	(United Kingdom) British	1864–1943
Peter Singer	Vienna, Austria	São Paulo, Brazil	(Brazil) Brazilian	1932–2018
Moritarō Yamada	Aichi, Japan	Unknown	(Japan) Japanese	1897–1980
Hajime Kawakami	Nishikimi, Yamaguchi, Japan	Kyoto, Japan	(Japan) Japanese	1879–1946
Tomizuka Ryozo	Chiba, Japan	Unknown	(Japan) Japanese	1923–2017
Sun Yefang	Wuxi County, Jiangsu, China	Beijing, China	(China) Chinese	1908–1983
Fred Moseley	United States	–	(United States) American	1946–

== See also ==
- List of contributors to Marxist theory
- Socialist economics
- Communism
- Socialism
