= Simple commodity production =

Concept in economic theory

Simple commodity production (German: einfache Warenproduktion, also translated as petty commodity production), is a term coined by Friedrich Engels in 1894 when he had compiled and edited the third volume of Marx's Capital. It refers to productive activities under the conditions of what Karl Marx had called the "simple exchange" or "simple circulation" of commodities, where independent producers trade their own products to obtain other products of (approximately) equivalent value. The use of the adjective simple is not intended to refer to the nature of the producers or of their production, but rather to the relatively simple and straightforward exchange processes involved, from an economic perspective.

As discussed below, both Karl Marx and Engels claimed explicitly that the law of value applied also to simple exchange, and that the operation of this law is modified (or, as Marx sometimes says, "inverted") by merchant capitalism and the capitalist mode of production in which most of the inputs and outputs of production (including means of production and labour power) become tradeable commodities. Many classical economists were aware of differences between simple commodity exchange and capitalist exchange, but they could not adequately explain the historical transformation of the one into the other. Sometimes their theories confused capitalist commodity trade with simple commodity trade.

According to Marx and Engels, simple commodity production and trade existed for millennia before the advent of industrial capitalism. From the beginnings of the bourgeois epoch in 15th century Europe, the reach and scope of commodity production began to grow incrementally, although sometimes this process was interrupted by wars, epidemic diseases, power relations and natural disasters. Only with the growth of free wage labour is commodity production generalized (verallgemeinert) to most of the economy, and fully integrated into national and international markets. Obviously, this market growth also required institutions, conventions and rules, so that the competing burghers could resolve their trade disputes fairly and efficiently, without destroying the markets and destroying people's livelihoods; through learning from experience as well as from the invention and widespread adoption of new ideas, a "market culture" gradually evolved to make that possible. Civil society could not be "civil", if the burghers defied all religion and authority, and resolved their trading disputes by robbing, physically attacking and killing each other.

Originally production for market sale existed alongside subsistence production (see also natural economy). That continued for millennia until urbanization, merchant trade and industrialization began to take off. Through the last six centuries, the share of commodity production in total output grew more and more, together with productivity growth and population growth. It grew steeply in the 19th and 20th centuries, until production for the market represented the largest part of total output value in the majority of countries.

To explain this lengthy historical process, Marx and Engels took a nuanced approach. They did not argue crudely that economic categories can only be either "transhistorical categories" or "categories specific to one historical period". Instead, they argued that economic categories can and do evolve from one historical epoch to the next, along with the evolution of the social relations which they express. Transitional phases and forms occurred, and continuities co-existed with discontinuities. Marx and Engels were both very aware that historically there existed gradations of market integration, and that the achievement of complete market integration was a very lengthy and complex historical process. The challenge was to understand dialectically, how the new economic relations could evolve out of the old ones - by retaining some of their content, losing some content, and also gaining some completely new content. Historically, the simple production and exchange of commodities evolved, it took different forms, and showed varying degrees of sophistication – from the simple exchange of surplus goods by independent farmers, to fulltime self-employed production of goods or services for profitable sale, using tools and other inputs bought in markets.

== Different interpretations ==
This historical, evolutionary viewpoint is however not accepted by all Marxists. The historical role of simple exchange based on simple commodity production has been the subject of considerable controversy among Marxist scholars. It has been claimed by academics that Marx never had a concept of "simple commodity production" because he did not use those words. If that is true, then it seems to academics that Engels's concept was really alien to Marx's thought. For example,

- the Italian Marx-scholar Roberto Fineschi alleges that Friedrich Engels (who was a successful businessman, and edited Volumes 1, 2 and 3 of Marx's Capital) failed to understand the difference between circulation and production, so that Engels falsely equated Marx's concept of "simple exchange of commodities" with "simple commodity production".
- According to Rolf Hecker's interpretation, by contrast, Engels does not equate Marx's concept of simple exchange of commodities with simple commodity production, but instead replaces simple exchange of commodities with simple commodity production.
- According to David Harvey, "Value... becomes an embedded regulatory norm in the sphere of exchange only under conditions of capital accumulation".
- Christopher J. Arthur claims that an economy or society fully based on simple commodity production has never existed in history, contrary to what Engels (allegedly) suggested. Since Marx never even used the term "simple commodity production", Arthur considers the whole idea a "myth" that refers to something that never existed. However, Arthur completely ignored that in several places Marx refers to simple commodity production (i.e. independent producers exchanging surpluses for other products of an approximately equivalent value) although Marx did not use that name for it.
- John Weeks believed that the law of value applies only to industrial capitalism, and not to market systems which preceded industrial capitalism.
- According to Helmut Reichelt, the law of value applies only when the whole of society is subsumed under the bourgeois form of the division of labour.
- Similarly, Tony Smith claims that “‘Value’ is a property of products only when commodity production and exchange is generalised”.
- Alex Callinicos argues that "the so-called historical interpretation of the labour theory of value" which claims that "it holds true in conditions of simple commodity production, prior to the development of capitalism", involves "a complete misunderstanding of Marx’s value theory". Following John Weeks and Robert Brenner, Callinicos claims that if an independent producer produces his own outputs with his own means of production, and sells part of his output in the village market, then no “commodity production” occurs at all, because the inputs for his production are not commodities, and the production process is not subject to the laws of competition. Therefore, Callinicos argues, it is simply wrong to call such production “simple commodity production”.
- Paul Sweezy accepted the validity of the category of simple commodity production, but he argued that “commodity production and feudalism are mutually exclusive concepts”, because in feudalism, the land is “owned by a class of non-producers".

Engels aimed to give a consistent explanation of the evolution and development of the market economy, from simple beginnings to the complexities of modern capitalist markets, but his critics argue he disregards the qualitative transformation of the relations of production involved. This criticism is difficult to understand, given that Marx and Engels both argued that the operation of the law of value is altered by the emergence of capitalist industry, precisely because of changing relations of production.

The new anti-Engels interpretation is contrary to the traditional Marxist view, the latter which defines a commodity as a product of labour and not (as academic value-form theorists do) as a product of exchange. According to the traditional Marxist view, the simple exchange of commodities presupposes at least that the commodities are produced. Otherwise there would not exist any commodities that could be exchanged. Commodities (Waren, wares) are created with the intention of exchanging them for other goods or money, but they are not created by the exchange process itself; at best one can say that the existence of commodities normally presupposes that there exists a market for them. Historically speaking, the development of the simple exchange of reproducible commodities could never occur without simple commodity production. Engels does not argue that the law of value disappears when commodity trade is regulated by production prices, but rather that the law of value is transformed and modified. It is transformed, because:

- Originally (as already recognized by Adam Smith) the exchange-value of what a producer creates is regulated by his own necessary labour-time (with upper and lower limits). But, in the end, the exchange-value of his production is completely regulated by a socially average labour-cost, i.e. a market value expressed as the normal price-level which is imposed on him as an objective external force, regardless of whether his own labour-time is more or less than the normal social average. Paradoxically, as Marx says, the more that the producers become dependent on exchange, the more the whole exchange process appears to become independent of them, following its own laws and logic.
- The simple exchange of approximate labour-equivalents as the basis for balanced trade is gradually replaced by the more complex exchange of unequal labour-values, where fluctuating market-prices for products systematically diverge from average product-values, and their supply-cost contains a surplus value formed in production. The exchange-values of products are no longer directly regulated by labour-values, but by prices of production (although the law of value ultimately still sets limits on price fluctuations). What therefore determines commodity prices at this stage are the average cost-prices and the average profit yields from their production and sale (the rates and volumes of profit).
- While originally the commodities sold were a surplus to the requirements of the seller, alongside subsistence production, eventually the market sale of the commodities produced is the precondition and the only practical purpose of producing them. In contrast to partial commodity production, generalized (universalized) commodity production means that most of the inputs of production are supplied as commodities, and most of the outputs are sold as commodities - with the consequence, that the whole production process is reorganized to conform to commercial criteria. This is the economic background for the transition from the formal subsumption of labour and production under capital (extraction of absolute surplus value from wage-labour, by increasing hours worked up to the absolute upper limit) to its real subsumption (extraction of relative surplus value, by increasing the productivity of wage-labour with better means of production, tools and techniques).

Instead of postulating a "society of simple commodity producers", Engels was referring to the history of the gradual expansion of commodity-trade alongside subsistence production across thousands of years, to more and more sectors of economic life - until commodity production is generalized and the majority of commodities are produced "by means of commodities" in capitalist enterprises employing wage labour. Marx had briefly indicated this historical process himself in his 1864 manuscript Results of the immediate process of production.

In the anti-Engels explanation, it is unclear what regulates commodity-trade in the pre-capitalist economy, if not the law of value. It is unclear how the law of value can "suddenly" appear out of nowhere, once most of production becomes commodity production through the growth of markets. Apparently, capital began to exist when wage-labour exists, i.e. when peasants and serfs were thrown off the land and were forced to work for a wage from an employer, to make a living. Somehow, a mass of employers "suddenly" appears out of nowhere to employ a mass of unemployed workers in mechanized factories, in exchange for wages. But how this could have resulted from the situation that preceded it, remains a puzzle.

This mystery is solved only when labour history and business history is studied. Long before the industrial capitalist appeared on the stage of history, wage-labourers were already being hired - when officials of the early state paid soldiers for their services, temple officials employed contract labourers, and landowners hired farm workers. The first known workers' strike recorded in written history, on a papyrus, was staged more than three thousand years ago by building workers at the royal necropolis at Deir el-Medina in Egypt, during the reign of Ramses III (see also Deir el-Medina strikes).

== Origins ==
Simple exchange of reproducible and portable commodities (such as foodstuffs, ornaments, beads, pottery, pelts, fabrics, clothing, tools, utensils, and weapons) is as old as the history of trade, insofar as it progressed from incidental barter of use-values according to cultural custom, to regular exchange using a standard of value. Simple exchange occurred for thousands of years before most production became organized in the capitalist way. It begins when producers in a simple division of labour (e.g. farmers, hunters/gatherers and artisans) trade surpluses to their own requirements, with the aim of obtaining other products with an (approximately) equivalent value, for their own use. In Marx's own words,

"Definite historical conditions are involved in the existence of the product as a commodity. (…) The appearance of products as commodities requires a level of development of the division of labour within society such that the separation of use-value from exchange-value, a separation which first begins with barter, has already been completed. But such a degree of development is common to many economic formations of society [ökonomischer Gesellschaftsformationen], with the most diverse historical characteristics. If we go on to consider money, its existence implies that a definite stage in the development of commodity exchange has been reached."

Through the experience of regular trade and competition, normal exchange values become established for products, which reflect an economy of labour-time and a cost-structure of production. The simple commodity producers could aim just to trade their products or services to obtain other products with an (approximately) equivalent value, or they could, in favourable circumstances, aim to realise a profit. They could sell their products or services to the final consumer, or to an intermediary such as a merchant. Simple commodity production and simple exchange are compatible with many different relations of production and exchange, ranging from self-employment in which the producer owns his own means of production and family (household) labour, to forms of slavery, peonage, indentured labour, and serfdom. In the cooperative farming system of the Soviet Union, members of the kolkhozy were quite often permitted to cultivate small plots of private farmland, to raise some livestock, and to sell their produce themselves.

The technologies used by a simple commodity producer might be characteristic for a specific mode of production, but simple commodity production as such is not specific to any particular mode of production, and might be found alongside (or articulated with) many different modes of production, with various degrees of sophistication. It does not necessarily imply, that all the inputs or outputs of productive activity in the local economy are commodities traded in markets. For example, simple commodity producers could produce some products for their own subsistence and for their own use on their own land, while trading another part of their products. They might buy or trade some tools and equipment, but also make some tools and equipment themselves. Simple commodity production continues to occur in capitalist societies, especially in developing countries. According to Marcel van der Linden, "The different combinations of subsistence labor and commodity production are infinite".

== Early settler colonies ==
A society which literally consisted only of simple commodity producers has never existed, and Friedrich Engels never claimed that either. No serious Marxian scholar has ever claimed that such a society really existed, although there were plenty agricultural regions where the vast majority of the economically active population consisted of independent farmers. However, at the dawn of the bourgeois epoch of history, many of the initial colonial settlements in foreign lands consisted largely of self-employed producers, who farmed their own land, or worked as artisans and tradesmen (for example, settler colonies in North America, Argentina, South Africa, Australia and New Zealand - this aspect is disregarded totally by Christopher J. Arthur). In these settler colonies, initially a class of landowners who owned most of the land and extracted rent from tenant farmers did not exist. Marx was well aware of this, and he remarked wrily that in the colonies "the capitalist regime constantly comes up against the obstacle presented by the producer, who, as owner of his own conditions of labour, employs that labour to enrich himself instead of the capitalist".). In his discussion of colonization in Capital, Vol. 1, Marx illustrates the colonial labour problem with an anecdote about an English entrepreneur who decided to emigrate to Australia:

"A Mr Peel, Mr Wakefield complains, took with him from England to the Swan River district of Western Australia means of subsistence and of production to the amount of £50,000. This Mr Peel even had the foresight to bring besides, 3,000 persons of the working class, men, women and children. Once he arrived at his destination, Mr Peel was left without a servant to make his bed or fetch him water from the river. Unhappy Mr Peel, who provided for everything except the export of English relations of production to Swan River!".

In the colony, there existed no absolute necessity or socio-economic compulsion to work for an employer, the rule of law could not be properly enforced, and conditions in the Swan River settlement were harsh, particularly because of a lack of infrastructure. So many workers ran off to go into business for themselves, or to find better conditions, jobs and wages in Perth, Sydney or other settlements in Australia. Mr Wakefield stated very precisely and explicitly why he thought attempts at colonization could fail despite favourable conditions (this was not a later "interpretation" by Marx):

"Why this failure with all the elements of success, a fine climate, plenty of good land, plenty of capital and enough labourers ? The explanation is easy. In this colony, there never has been a class of labourers. Those who went out as labourers no sooner reached the colony than they were tempted by the superabundance of good land to become landowners."

Wakefield's own proposed method of "systematic colonization" was specifically designed to overcome the labour problems encountered in previous attempts at establishing settler colonies. A "sufficient price" would be put on colonial land, so that workers first had to earn and save money with wage-labour for several years, before they could eventually buy their own land. However, Wakefield's scheme assumed, that the colonial government would have full control over land ownership and land sales. This was usually not the case, especially in the "anarchic" first stage of colonialization. It created opportunities and openings for settlers to stake out claims, occupy land, obtain contracts, and trade properties without intermediation or strict supervision by the colonial government. Moreover, it was often also in the interest of colonial governments to make it easier for new colonists to set up in business, in order to attract still more settlers; the more settlers arrived, the faster new infrastructures and services could be established for the colony, and the more powerful the colony became.

An American historian comments that:

"By the mid-1600s... [a]bout three-quarters of the colonists [in colonial America] were farmers. (…) Most farmers owned their land. To encourage immigration, colonists often received free or almost free land. Land was readily available at low prices (…) Most immigrants and native-born colonists enjoyed ample opportunity to acquire property. Upon completing terms of indenture, on average four years in duration, servants often received plots of land on which to begin their lives as freemen."

The proportion of early American colonists who worked as artisans is estimated to have been between 10% and 18%. So the vast majority of the workforce at that time (up to about 93%) consisted not of waged employees, but of independent farmers plus artisans, both engaging in simple commodity production. Imported African slaves "worked mainly on the tobacco, rice and indigo plantations of the southern coast, from the Chesapeake Bay colonies of Maryland and Virginia south to Georgia." Before 1660, few Virginia planters owned slaves. By 1675 the use of slaves was common, and by 1700 slaves largely replaced indentured servants. "With plentiful land and slave labor available to grow a lucrative crop, southern planters prospered, and family-based tobacco plantations became the economic and social norm". In hindsight, Marx concluded that:

"In fact the veiled slavery of the wage-labourers in Europe needed the unqualified slavery of the New World as its pedestal. (…) If money, according to [a critique in 1842 of public finance by monsieur Marie] Augier, 'comes into the world with a congenital blood-stain on one cheek,' capital comes dripping from head to toe, from every pore, with blood and dirt."

In an early appraisal of David Ricardo’s theory of land rent, Marx notes the difference between (1) independent "farming colonists" in colonial Australia and America who “are not capitalists” and who do not engage in capitalist production, although they sell their surpluses for money to obtain manufactured goods, and (2) the hybrid form of colonial plantations based mainly on slave labour, which is conducted by capitalists who are “at the same time capitalist and landowner”.

From the time of the earliest British colonial settlements of the 1600s until America began to issue its own currency in 1783, three different types of money were used in colonial commodity trade: (1) coins such as Spanish dollars and shillings, (2) paper notes including fiat money denominated in British pounds, shillings and pence; land notes; bank notes; and tobacco notes, and (3) portable goods and services offered in exchange, including tobacco, corn, wampum, buttons, etc.

== Textual sources of the concept ==
In The Wealth of Nations (1776), Adam Smith introduces the concept of simple commodity production as follows:

"In that early and rude state of society which precedes both the accumulation of stock [of capital] and the appropriation of land, the proportion between the quantities of labour necessary for acquiring different objects seems to be the only circumstance which can afford any rule for exchanging them for one another. (…) In this state of things, the whole produce of labour belongs to the labourer; and the quantity of labour commonly employed in acquiring or producing any commodity, is the only circumstance which can regulate the quantity of labour which it ought commonly to purchase, command, or exchange for."

If the trading process cost too much labour and yielded too little (money or goods) in exchange, the trading process would break down, and none of the trading partners would be able to get what they wanted. So there were definite conditions for balanced and sustainable trade. Smith went on to contrast simple commodity production with capitalist production involving wage labour:

"As soon as [a capital] stock has accumulated in the hands of particular persons, some of them will naturally employ it in setting to work industrious people, whom they will supply with materials and subsistence, in order to make a profit by the sale of their work, or by what their labour adds to the value of the materials. (…) [The employer] could have no interest to employ [workers], unless he expected from the sale of their work something more than what was sufficient to replace his stock to him; and he could have no interest to employ a great stock rather than a small one, unless his profits were to bear some proportion to the extent of his stock."

In a conspectus and critique of Adam Smith's theory of value, Marx similarly gives a brief description of simple commodity production (although admittedly he did not use that terminology):

"Let us assume that all workers are producers of commodities, and not only produce their commodities but also sell them. The value of these commodities is determined by the necessary labour-time contained in them. If therefore the commodities are sold at their value, the labourer buys with one commodity, which is the product of twelve hours’ labour-time, another twelve hours’ labour-time in the form of another commodity, that is to say, twelve hours’ labour-time which is embodied in another use-value. The value of his labour is therefore equal to the value of his commodity; that is, it is equal to the product of twelve hours’ labour-time. The selling and buying again, in a word, the whole process of exchange, the metamorphosis of the commodity, alters nothing in this. It alters only the form of the use-value in which this twelve hours’ labour-time appears. The value of labour is therefore equal to the value of the product of labour."

In this situation of simple exchange, Marx argues (like Adam Smith did) that a given quantity of living labour would ordinarily always command an (approximately) equivalent amount of labour objectified in commodities (if that wasn't the case, the trade imbalances would cause the trading system of independent producers to break down after a while, when the costs of trade became too high and the gains too low). However, Marx continues, in all modes of production where one or more social classes own the means of production, while commoners own only their ability to work for a living, this general equivalence does not exist (because commoners or workers perform surplus labour, and unequal exchange occurs). This explained why Adam Smith, who believed that labour is the substance of value, mistakenly concluded that when wage-labour coexists with capital and landed property, labour is no longer “the immanent measure which regulates the exchange value of commodities”. According to Marx, Smith should have concluded instead, that the expressions “quantity of labour” (or embodied/objectified labour) and “value of labour” (i.e. living labour commanded in exchange) are no longer identical in a class society (which, Marx notes, was later also pointed out by David Ricardo).

In his 1894 preface to Capital, Volume 3, Friedrich Engels argued that:

"...at the beginning of Volume 1... Marx takes simple commodity production as his historical presupposition, only later, proceeding from this basis, to come on to capital... he proceeds... from the simple commodity and not from a conceptually and historically secondary form, the commodity as already modified by capitalism".

This interpretation by Engels closely followed what Marx himself stated in his 1864 manuscript titled Results of the immediate process of production:

"The commodity that emerges from capitalist production is different from the commodity we began with as the element, the precondition of capitalist production. We began with the individual commodity viewed as an autonomous article in which a specific amount of labour-time is objectified and which therefore has an exchange-value of a definite amount. (...) The individual commodity viewed as the product, the actual elementary component of capital that has been generated and reproduced, differs then from the individual commodity with which we began, and which we regarded as an autonomous article, as the presupposition [Voraussetzung] of capital formation."

However, the interpretation by Engels arguably did not completely match what Marx said about his own approach. In his critical notes on Adolph Wagner's Textbook on political economy (1879), Marx said about his analysis of the commodity form in Capital, Volume 1 that:

"What I proceed from is the simplest social form in which the product of labour presents itself in contemporary society, and this is the "commodity." This I analyse, initially in the form in which it appears."

Here Marx states clearly, that in the first chapter of Capital Vol. 1 he was talking about the commodity as the simplest traded object "in contemporary society", and not about a simple commodity in pre-capitalist society. Point is, when Marx first analyzes a commodity as such (as a very simple observable category of trade), he disregards how exactly the commodity is produced and how specifically it is traded. He just examines the commodity (in his own words) "as an autonomous article", as a separate thing just as it observably appears in an everyday trading relation - without introducing all sorts of assumptions about how and where it originated, or what it will be used for. Put another way, Marx is talking about simple commodity circulation, not simple commodity production, although the former could assume the latter (the simple exchange of a commodity could be preceded by different forms of producing it).

In his 1895 afterword Supplement and addendum to Volume 3 of Capital, Friedrich Engels elaborates the concept of simple commodity production as follows:

”... Marx's law of value applies universally, as much as any economic laws do apply, for the entire period of simple commodity production, i.e. up to the time at which this undergoes a modification by the onset of the capitalist form of production. Up till then, prices gravitate to the values determined by Marx's law and oscillate around these values, so that the more completely simple commodity production develops, the more do average prices coincide with values for longer periods when not interrupted by external violent disturbances, and with the insignificant variations we mentioned earlier. Thus the Marxian law of value has a universal economic validity for an era lasting from the beginning of the exchange that transforms products into commodities down to the fifteenth century of our epoch. But commodity exchange dates from a time before any written history, going back to at least 3500 B.C. in Egypt, and 4000 B.C. or maybe even 6000 B.C. in Babylon; thus the law of value prevailed for a period of some five to seven millennia.”

Again, Engels based himself on (and references) what Marx himself had said – in chapter 10 of Capital, Volume 3 (on the levelling out of differences in rates of profit by competition):

”The exchange of commodities at their values, or at approximately these values… [Marx writes] corresponds to a much lower stage of development than the exchange at prices of production, for which a definite degree of capitalist development is needed. Whatever may be the ways in which the prices of different commodities are first established or fixed in relation to one another, the law of value governs their movement. When the labour-time required for their production falls, prices fall; and where it rises, prices rise, as long as other circumstances remain equal. Apart from the way in which the law of value governs prices and their movement, it is also quite apposite to view the values of commodities not only as theoretically prior to the prices of production, but also as historically prior to them. This applies to those conditions in which the means of production belong to the worker, and this condition is to be found, in both the ancient and the modern world among peasant proprietors and handicraftsmen who work for themselves. This agrees, moreover, with the opinion we expressed previously, viz. that the development of products into commodities arises from exchange between different communities, and not between the members of one and the same community. This is true not only for the original condition, but also for later social conditions based on slavery and serfdom, and for the guild organization of handicraft production, as long as the means of production involved in each branch of production can be transferred from one sphere to another only with difficulty, and the different spheres of production therefore relate to one another, within certain limits, like foreign countries or communistic communities.”

In these passages, both Engels and Marx make it very clear, that they believed the law of value governed the trade of commodities long before capitalism existed, and that the law of value is altered by the emergence of mercantile and industrial capitalism (which involves, as Marx explains, the inversion of the simple circuit of trade, from C-M-C' to M-C-M', and the transformation from M-C-M' to M - C {Mp + Lp}... P... C' - M'. Aided by the scientific findings of modern archaeological and historical research about ancient and prehistoric trade, this simple Marxian insight can be confirmed in a much more precise and detailed way.

Commodities are objects of trade. To trade commodities, they have to be produced first so that they are available for sale. To produce and trade commodities costs definite amounts of labour time. Whatever the specific terms of trade may be, those terms of trade somehow have to be compatible with labour requirements (otherwise the trading system breaks down). Since people normally take their own interest and advantage into account when they trade (they have to be able to survive, and they want to prosper), labour requirements become a general regulator (a constraint or limit, with upper and lower bounds) of the terms of trade. The more that trade and markets develop, the more the value of commodities is set by the socially average replacement costs in living labour time, and the more prices will approximate that value. The higher the average labour content represented by commodities, the higher their value, and the lower their average labour content, the lower their value. In general, there is therefore an approximate correspondence between relative hours of labour worked, and the relative price levels of the products of that labour.

== From simple commodity production to capitalist production ==
The large-scale global transformation of simple commodity production into capitalist production based on the wage labour of employees occurred only in the last two centuries of human history. It is preceded by the strong growth of merchant trade, supported by credit from financiers who earn rents, profit and interest from the process. The merchants not only act as intermediary between producers and consumers, but also integrate more and more of production into a market economy. That is, more and more is produced for the purpose of market trade, rather than for own use. The initial result is known as "merchant capitalism", which flourished in Western European cities especially in the 17th and 18th centuries but already existed on a smaller scale in the 15th century and even earlier.

However, the transformation of more and more simple commodity production into capitalist production which accompanies industrialisation requires profound changes in property relations, because it must be possible to trade freely in means of production (materials, equipment, buildings, installations and land) and labour power (the factors of production). Only when that trade becomes possible, can the whole of production be reorganised to conform to commercial principles. Parallel to the growth of markets, capital and industries is a growing class of wage earners who are compelled to sell their labour for a living, because they lack other means of survival.

Marx describes capitalist society as "a society where the commodity-form is the universal form of the product of labour, hence the dominant social relation is the relation between people as possessors of commodities". He argues that "The capitalist epoch is... characterized by the fact that labour-power, in the eyes of the worker himself, takes on the form of a commodity which is his property; his labour consequently takes on the form of wage-labour... it is only from this moment that the commodity-form of the products of labour becomes universal." Thus, "...from the moment there is a free sale, by the worker himself, of labour power as a commodity... from then onwards... commodity production is generalized and becomes the typical form of production."

In a 1864 manuscript, Marx emphasized specifically that:

"Capital cannot come into being except on the foundation of the circulation of commodities (including money), i.e. where trade has already grown to a certain given degree. For their part, however, the production and circulation of commodities do not at all imply the existence of the capitalist mode of production. On the contrary… they may be found even in 'pre-bourgeois modes of production'. They constitute the historical premiss of the capitalist mode of production. On the other hand, however, once the commodity has become the general form of the product, then everything that is produced must assume that form; sale and purchase embrace not just excess produce, but its very substance, and the various conditions of production themselves appear as commodities which leave circulation and enter production only on the foundations of capitalist production. Hence if the commodity appears on the one hand as the premiss of the formation of capital, it is also essentially the result, the product of capitalist production once it has become the universal elementary form of the product. At earlier stages of production a part of what was produced took the form of commodities. Capital, however, necessarily produces its product as a commodity. This is why as capitalist production, i.e. capital, develops, the general laws governing the commodity evolve in proportion; for example, the laws affecting value develop in the distinct form of the circulation of money."

To reach the stage of a universal market, many legal, political, religious and technical restrictions imposed on commercial trade must be overcome. The unification of a "home market" among people in a country who can speak the same language typically stimulated nationalist ideologies. But depending on the existing social systems, the transformation might occur in many different ways. Typically, though, it has involved wars, violence and revolutions, since people were unwilling to just give away assets, rights and income that they previously had. Communally owned property, hereditary land ownership, the property of religious orders and state property all had to be privatised and amalgamated, in order to become tradeable assets in the process of capital accumulation. The ideology of the rising bourgeoisie typically emphasized the benefits of privately owned property for the purpose of wealth creation and industriousness.

Marx refers to this process as the primitive accumulation of capital, a process which continues particularly in developing countries to this day. Marx shows that primitive accumulation involves to a large extent the expropriation of independent producers, who lose their means of production, and therefore are forced to work for an employer to earn a living. Typically, previously independent producers on the land (but also serfs and indentured labourers etc.) are proletarianised and migrate to the urban centres, in search of work from an employer.

Simple commodity production nevertheless continues to occur on a large scale in the world economy, particularly in peasant production. It also persists within industrialised capitalist economies in the form of self-employment by free producers. Capitalist firms sometimes contract out specialised services to self-employed producers, who can produce them at a lower cost, or provide a superior product. Many digital products are produced by self-employed specialists who own their own computer (but who also depend on internet providers, and on access to rented software and websites).

== Modelling simple commodity production ==
The historical example of early settler colonies suggests that an "imaginary society" of simple commodity producers temporarily became a reality, as an early phase in the evolution of new social formations. In that sense, a "93% society of simple commodity producers" did exist for a while. However, in some schools of Marxian economics, simple commodity production refers only to a model of a hypothetical economy (or an "imaginary society") used by economists to interpret some of Karl Marx's insights about the economic laws governing the development of commodity trade. The model is only a thought experiment to identify some quantitative implications of commercial production and trade. In this society, a market economy is supposed in which all producers are independent individuals who own and operate their own means of production, and who trade their own products. According to Michio Morishima,

"In such a society, there are no capitalists and hence no exploitation of workers by them; prices or exchange ratios between commodities must in the state of equilibrium be equal to the relative [labour-]values, provided the primary factors of production other than labour are all free. It is true that the actual exchange ratios in the market may differ from the relative [labour-]values (...) [but] the market price will ultimately be settled at the equilibrium exchange ratio, which is equal to the relative [labour-]value."

Ronald L. Meek explains:

“…the Classical economists were primarily interested in the problem of the development of the capitalist system, but they believed that a necessary preliminary study of this problem was an analysis of the nature of the capitalist system as such. And the best method of going about this analysis, they believed, was to begin by imagining capitalism suddenly impinging upon a pre-capitalist form of economy in which, in effect, labour was the only “factor” receiving a reward. In this pre-capitalist economy, which Smith called the “early and rude state of society” and Marx called “simple commodity production”, the whole produce of labour went to the labourers. In such an economy, it was claimed, the relative equilbrium prices of commodities would tend to be equal to the relative quantities of labour required from first to last to produce them. What happened, then, when a class of capitalists arrived on the scene, and the net product of the economy consequently came to be shared between labourers and capitalists? In particular, what happened to relative equilibrium prices? Did they remain equal to relative quantities of embodied labour, or did they diverge from these quantities? If they diverged, were the divergences haphazard, or could they be shown in some useful sense “subject to law”? Did the divergences render it necessary to throw out completely the simple “law of value” which used to operate in the pre-capitalist economy, or could they be regarded as merely modifying its operation? These questions were not regarded as purely academic ones, with little relevance to problems of practical policy. On the contrary, the Classical economists believed that if one could give adequate answers to them, one would be properly equipped to proceed to the major task – that of the determination of what Marx (and Mill) called the “laws of motion” of the capitalist system.”

== Academic discussion ==
The theoretical debates about simple commodity production have attracted contributions from numerous economists, philosophers and historians across the last century. This seemingly obscure topic has important implications for quite a few different areas of research:

- The interpretation of Marx’s method of analysis and his theory of value;
- The interpretation of the historical transition from pre-capitalist society to capitalism (and more generally, the social history of trade and marketization and the evolution of the forms of economic value);
- The so-called transformation problem;
- Understanding settler colonialism and the post-colonial economy;
- The theory and practice of development economics;
- The economics of the transition from capitalism to socialism and communism (the gradual replacement of market allocation by direct allocation).
- The debates about the desirability, feasibility and unorthodoxy of a market socialism with a variety of trading processes and property forms.

Contributors to the theoretical discussion have included (among others) Michael von Tugan-Baranowsky, Nikolai Bukharin, Karl Kautsky, Rudolf Hilferding, Oskar Lange, Josef Winternitz, Paul Sweezy, Piero Sraffa, Ronald L. Meek, Robert Rowthorn, Helmut Reichelt, Joan Robinson, Isaak Illich Rubin, Roman Rosdolsky, Maurice Dobb, Ernest Mandel, Robert Brenner, Caroline Moser, Gerd Hardach & Jürgen Schilling, Rodney H. Hilton, Michio Morishima & George Catephores, Jairus Banaji, Henry Bernstein, Richard Britnell, Juan Iñigo, Dimitris Milonakis, John Roemer, Rolf Hecker, John Weeks, Harriet Friedmann, Hans-Georg Backhaus, Ben Fine, Wladimir Schkredow, Nadja Rakowitz, Christopher J. Arthur, Arthur Diquattro, Neil Davidson, Kalyan Sanyal, Kolja Lindner, Howard Nicholas, Alex Callinicos, Octavio Colombo, Prabhat Patnaik, Anwar M. Shaikh, Ellen Meiksins Wood, Paresh Chattopadhyay, Andrew B. Trigg, Ian P. Wright, Chris Wickham, Allin F. Cottrell, Paul Cockshott, Gregory John Michaelson & Victor Yakovenko, Barbara Harriss-White, Srishti Yadav, Michael Heinrich, and Bill Jefferies.

== See also ==
Petite bourgeoisie
