= Thomas T. Sekine =

Japanese economist (1933–2022)

Tomohiko Sekine, a.k.a. Thomas T. Sekine
- Born: 22 November 1933
- Died: 16 January 2022 (aged 88)

Academic background
- Education: Hitotsubashi University
- Academic advisor: Shigeto Tsuru
- Influences: Kozo Uno, Karl Marx

Academic work
- Discipline: Political economy
- School or tradition: Marxian economics
- Institutions: York University

Tomohiko Sekine (関根 友彦, Sekine Tomohiko; 22 November 1933 – 16 January 2022), a.k.a. Thomas T. Sekine was a Japanese economist and was considered to be one of the most important theorists on the field of Marx's labor theory of value. His main work The Dialectic of Capital was published in 1986. He was a scholar of Kozo Uno.

== Published works ==
- Sekine, Thomas T.: The Dialectic of Capital. A Study of the Inner Logic of Capitalism, as Japanese title, Bumpai no Genri, 2 volumes (preliminary edition), Tokyo 1986; ISBN 978-4-924750-33-3 (vol. 1), ISBN 4-924750-34-4 (vol. 2). doi:10.4444/34.1.
- Sekine, Thomas T.: An Outline of the Dialectic of Capital, 2 volumes, London, New York 1997; international: ISBN 0-333-66677-1 (vol. 1), ISBN 0-333-66678-X (vol. 2); Nordamerika: ISBN 0-312-17559-0 (vol. 1), ISBN 0-312-17560-4 (vol. 2), ISBN 0-312-17558-2 (set). doi:10.4444/34.2.
- Sekine, Thomas T.: Uno-Riron: A Japanese Contribution to Marxian Political Economy, in: Journal of Economic Literature 13 (1975), pp. 847–877. doi:10.4444/34.100.

== Bibliography ==
- Kubota, Ken: Die dialektische Darstellung des allgemeinen Begriffs des Kapitals im Lichte der Philosophie Hegels. Zur logischen Analyse der politischen Ökonomie unter besonderer Berücksichtigung Adornos und der Forschungsergebnisse von Rubin, Backhaus, Reichelt, Uno und Sekine (PDF), in: Beiträge zur Marx-Engels-Forschung. Neue Folge 2009, pp. 199–224. doi:10.4444/100.100.de.
- Kubota, Ken: The Dialectical Presentation of the General Notion of Capital in the Light of Hegel's Philosophy: On the Logical Analysis of Political Economy with Special Consideration of Adorno and the Research Results of Rubin, Backhaus, Reichelt, Uno, and Sekine (PDF), in: Revista Dialectus 9 (2020), no. 18, pp. 39–65. doi:10.4444/100.100.
- Pack, Spencer J. "Do not dump the Unoites – Unoite school of Marxist thought in Japan". Monthly Review. 39 (8). Archived from the original on March 11, 2007 – via FindArticles.
- Pozo, Luis M. (October 2001). "Dialectics and Deconstruction in Political Economy". Archived from the original on March 11, 2007 – via FindArticles.
- Saraka, Sean: Review of Albritton's "Dialectics and Deconstruction in Political Economy“.
- Westra, Richard (October 2002). "Marxian economic theory and an ontology of socialism: A Japanese intervention". Archived from the original on March 11, 2007 – via FindArticles.
