= Mercantile capitalism =

Mercantile capitalism may refer to:

- Merchant capitalism
- Mercantilism
