= Theoretician =

Theoretician may refer to:

- A person associated with the theory (as opposed to practical aspects) of a subject
- A social theorist, a theoretician in the social sciences
- Theoretician (Marxism), term used in Marxism
- Theoretician (chess), someone who writes about the theory of the game of chess
