= Hans-Georg Backhaus =

German economist and philosopher (1929–2026)

Hans-Georg Backhaus (1929, Remda – 8 March 2026, Frankfurt) was a German Marxian economist and philosopher. He was one of the main authors of the Neue Marx-Lektüre and he is considered one of the most important German theorists in the field of Marxian theory of value.

Backhaus began a long-term cooperation with Helmut Reichelt already from his years of university studies.

In the 2026 Frankfurt city council election, Backhaus ran as a candidate for the party Sahra Wagenknecht Alliance. However, he died on 8 March 2026, one week before election day.

== Selected publications ==
=== Main works ===
- Backhaus, Hans-Georg: Dialektik der Wertform. Untersuchungen zur Marxschen Ökonomiekritik. Freiburg i. Br. 1997.

=== Other publications ===
- Hans-Georg Backhaus (1984). "Zur Marxschen 'Revolutionierung' und 'Kritik' der Ökonomie: Die Bestimmung ihres Gegenstandes als Ganzes 'verrückter Formen'". Mehrwert: Beiträge zur Kritik der politischen Ökonomie (in German). 25: 7–35.
- Backhaus, Hans-Georg: Über den Doppelsinn der Begriffe „Politische Ökonomie“ und „Kritik“ bei Marx und in der Frankfurter Schule. In: Wolfgang Harich zum Gedächtnis. Eine Gedenkschrift in zwei Bänden. Hrsg. von Stefan Dornuf und Reinhard Pitsch. Bd. 2. München 2000, S. 12–213.

== Sources ==
- Eldred, Michael Critique of competitive freedom and the bourgeois-democratic state Copenhagen: Kurasje, 1984 ISBN 87-87437-40-6.
- Bonefeld, Werner (October 1998). "Dialektik der Wertform: Untersuchungen zur marxschen Okonomiekritik". Archived from the original on 11 March 2007 – via FindArticles.
- Bonefeld, Werner (October 2001). "Kapital and its subtitle: A note on the meaning of critique". Archived from the original on 11 March 2007 – via FindArticles.
- Kubota, Ken: Die dialektische Darstellung des allgemeinen Begriffs des Kapitals im Lichte der Philosophie Hegels. Zur logischen Analyse der politischen Ökonomie unter besonderer Berücksichtigung Adornos und der Forschungsergebnisse von Rubin, Backhaus, Reichelt, Uno und Sekine (PDF), in: Beiträge zur Marx-Engels-Forschung. Neue Folge 2009, pp. 199–224. doi:10.4444/100.100.de.
- Kubota, Ken: The Dialectical Presentation of the General Notion of Capital in the Light of Hegel's Philosophy: On the Logical Analysis of Political Economy with Special Consideration of Adorno and the Research Results of Rubin, Backhaus, Reichelt, Uno, and Sekine (PDF), in: Revista Dialectus 9 (2020), no. 18, pp. 39–65. doi:10.4444/100.100.
