= Makoto Ito =

Makoto Ito, Makoto Itoh, Makoto Itō, or Makoto Itou – the romanized variants of a Japanese name using Western name order (given name, then family name) – can refer to:

- Makoto Itoh (born 1936), Japanese economist
- Makoto Ito, the primary character in School Days, a Japanese visual novel
- Makoto Ito (ice hockey) (born 2004), Japanese ice hockey player
