= Commodity production =

Commodity production may refer to:

- Production of commodities
- Capitalist mode of production (Marxist theory)
- Simple commodity production
- Socialist mode of production
