= Kōzō Uno =

Japanese Marxian economist (1897–1977)

- 宇野 弘蔵
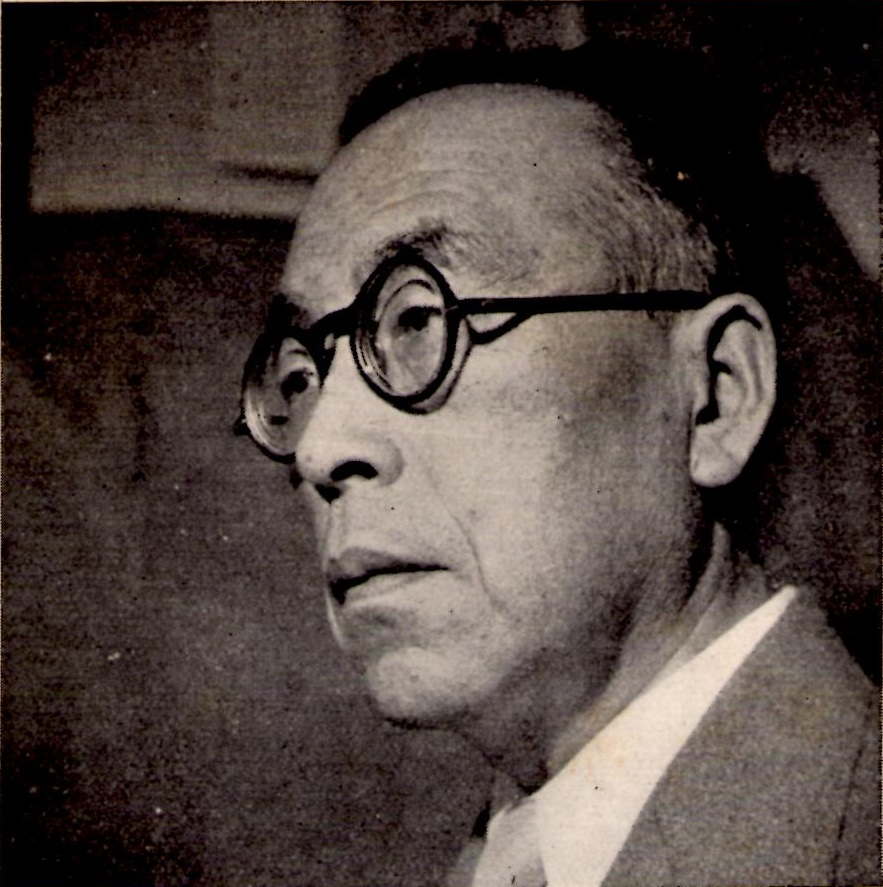
- Uno in 1952
- Born: 12 November 1897; Kurashiki, Okayama Prefecture, Japan
- Died: 22 February 1977 (aged 79); Kugenuma, Fujisawa, Kanagawa Prefecture, Japan

Academic background
- Education: University of Tokyo
- Influences: Hegel, Marx, Sombart, Kautsky, Hilferding, Lenin, Weber, Ōuchi Hyōe, Sakisaka Itsurō

Academic work
- Discipline: Political economy
- School or tradition: Marxian economics, Marxist revisionism
- Institutions: University of Tokyo
- Notable ideas: Uno School, theory of pure capitalism, three-level methodology

Kōzō Uno (Japanese: 宇野 弘蔵, Uno Kōzō; 12 November 1897 – 22 February 1977) was a Japanese Marxian economist. His work, which sought to create a purely "scientific" reading of Karl Marx's critique of political economy, was highly influential in postwar Japan and led to the formation of the "Uno School" of Marxian thought.

Uno is best known for his three-level methodology for the study of capitalism, which he developed to separate what he saw as Marx's pure economic theory from its historical and empirical illustrations. This method consists of: (1) the "theory of principles" (genriron), which outlines the logic of a "purely capitalist society" abstractly; (2) the "stages theory" (dankairon), which analyzes the historical development of capitalism through mercantilism, liberalism, and imperialism; (3) the "analysis of the present situation" (genjō bunseki), which examines the concrete details of contemporary capitalism.

In his major work, Principles of Political Economy, Uno reconstructed Marx's Capital to fit this three-level approach, arguing that Marx had improperly mixed these levels of analysis. Uno's reconstruction prioritized the sphere of circulation over production and was critical of Marx's introduction of the labor theory of value. His work and that of his followers, such as Thomas T. Sekine and Makoto Itoh, has been influential in Anglophone Marxian debates, but has also has been criticized for by some for 'removing the critical core of Marx's work, particularly the theory of commodity fetishism', in favor of an equilibrium-based model of capitalism.

== Biography ==
=== Early life and education ===
Uno was born in 1897 in Kurashiki, a town in Okayama Prefecture, Japan, to a merchant family. At the time, Kurashiki was notable for its modern spinning mill industry and its history as a major merchant site during the Edo period. In 1918, he enrolled at Tokyo Imperial University to study economics, graduating in 1921. After graduation, he took a position at the Ōhara Institute for Social Science, affiliated with Hosei University in Tokyo.

The academic environment in Japan at the time was largely influenced by anti-Marxist, German-style liberal economics. Seeking to deepen his interest in Karl Marx and "scientific socialism", Uno traveled to Berlin, Germany, in 1921. He spent two years there studying Marx's Capital and the works of Vladimir Lenin, reading them in the original German as complete Japanese translations were not yet available. He returned to Japan in 1924 and became an associate professor of economic policy at Tohoku Imperial University.

=== Pre-war debates and persecution ===
Between 1933 and 1937, Uno became deeply involved in the "Debate on Japanese Capitalism" (Nihon shihonshugi ronsō), a major intellectual conflict within Japanese Marxism concerning the nature of the Meiji Restoration and the path to a socialist revolution. The debate was split between two main factions: the Kōza-ha (Lectures-group), which was loyal to the Comintern and Japanese Communist Party line that Japan was still semi-feudal and required a two-stage revolution; and the Rōnō-ha (Labor-farmer-group), which argued that Japan was already a fully capitalist country and was ready for a one-stage socialist revolution.

Although not a direct member, Uno was closely associated with the Rōnō-ha. As the Japanese government grew increasingly ultranationalist and repressive, both factions faced severe persecution. In 1938, during the "Popular Front Incident" (Jinmin sensen jiken), more than 400 members and associates of the Rōnō-ha were arrested, including Uno, who was briefly detained. While many other Marxist academics were purged from their positions, Uno was able to secure a private research post at Tōhoku Imperial University in 1941.

=== Post-war career and influence ===
After World War II, Uno's academic career flourished. In 1947, he was appointed professor of economics at the prestigious Tokyo Imperial University (later the University of Tokyo), where he taught until his retirement in 1958. During this period, he became a prolific writer, publishing his seminal Theory of Value (Kachiron) in 1947 and his most famous work, Principles of Political Economy (Keizai Genron), in 1950–52.

His work was marked by a deliberate detachment from the official ideology of the Japanese Communist Party and the Comintern, and his outspoken anti-Stalinism earned him significant respect and a large following. This following evolved into the Uno School (Uno Gakuha) of political economy, which became one of the dominant streams of social science in post-war Japan. Many well-known Marxist economists, including Makoto Itoh, Thomas T. Sekine, and the intellectual and cultural historian Karatani Kōjin, were his students or were heavily influenced by his work. After retiring from the University of Tokyo, Uno continued to teach at Hosei University until 1968. He died in 1977.

== Economic theory ==
Uno's work was a radical re-interpretation of Marx's critique of political economy. He argued that Marx's Capital was methodologically "impure" because it mixed the abstract, logical analysis of capitalism with concrete historical narratives and empirical data, particularly from 19th-century England. To remedy this, Uno proposed a strict methodological separation of the study of capitalism into three distinct levels of analysis.

=== Three-level methodology ===
Uno's signature contribution to Marxian theory is his three-level methodology (sandankairon). This framework is designed to create a "scientific" political economy by systematically separating its different layers of abstraction.

1. The "theory of principles" (genriron): This is the most abstract level. It studies the fundamental economic laws of capitalism in a hypothetical "purely capitalist society" (junsui shihonshugi), free from all historical contingencies or non-capitalist elements. This level is concerned only with the internal logic of capital, comprising the three major classes of capitalists, workers, and landowners.
2. The "stages theory" (dankairon): This middle level of analysis applies the pure theory to the concrete historical development of capitalism. Uno divided this development into three stages, each characterized by a dominant form of capital and a corresponding state policy: mercantilism (merchant capital), liberalism (laissez-faire and industrial capital), and imperialism (finance capital). This level accounts for the "impurities" of real-world capitalism, such as uneven development between nations.
3. "Analysis of the present situation" (genjō bunseki): This is the most concrete level, dealing with the empirical analysis of contemporary capitalism in specific countries or periods. This level, according to Uno, serves as the basis for direct "socialist practical action".

Uno believed that by separating these levels, political economy could achieve scientific coherence, something he argued Marx's Capital lacked because it conflated all three.

=== Reconstruction of Capital ===
In his Principles of Political Economy, Uno undertook a major reconstruction of the architecture of Marx's Capital to align with his three-level method. He argued that Marx's presentation was flawed, particularly his decision to introduce the labor theory of value at the very beginning of Capital. Uno considered this "premature", contending that the substance of value (labor) could only be properly understood after the forms of circulation (commodity, money, capital) had been fully developed.

Consequently, Uno's Principles inverts the structure of Capital, Volume I. It begins not with the process of production but with the "Doctrine of Circulation", analyzing the forms of commodity, money, and capital as logical prerequisites to production. For Uno, the "commodity economy"—a society dominated by commodity exchange—is the defining feature of capitalism, and its logic must be established before analyzing the labor process. This stands in contrast to Marx, for whom the specific social relation of production between capital and wage-labor is the foundation of the capitalist mode of production.

=== Law of value and crisis theory ===
Uno's understanding of the law of value also diverges significantly from traditional interpretations of Marx. For Uno, the law of value functions as a "corrective process" that ensures a general social equilibrium between supply and demand. In his view, capitalist production, despite its "anarchistic" nature, is fundamentally oriented toward satisfying "society's needs" through the mediation of price movements. This view has been criticized as positing a harmonious, self-regulating market, thereby downplaying the inherent contradictions and crisis tendencies of capitalism that were central to Marx's analysis.

Uno's theory of crisis is, accordingly, a theory of business cycles rather than a theory of the inescapable, secular crisis of capitalism. He argues that crises are primarily caused by labor power shortages during periods of prosperity, which lead to rising wages, a squeeze on profits, and a subsequent depression. During the depression, new, more productive technologies are introduced, a relative surplus population is created, and the conditions for a new phase of prosperity are established. This cyclical process, regulated by the "law of population", allows capitalism to be self-sustaining. This contrasts with Marx's view that the law of value is a "law of crisis" and that the constant formation of a surplus population is not a solution but a symptom of capital's fundamental contradiction.

== Legacy and criticism ==
Uno's work established a major school of Marxian thought in Japan and gained significant international attention, particularly in the Anglophone world through the translations and elaborations of his students Thomas T. Sekine and Makoto Itoh, and later by scholars like Robert Albritton. The Uno School is characterized by its adherence to the three-level methodology and its focus on constructing a "pure theory" of capitalism based on Uno's reading of Marx.

However, Uno's project has faced significant criticism. According to the scholar Elena Louisa Lange, Uno's reconstruction of Marx amounts to a theory of "value without fetish". By bracketing Marx's critique of commodity fetishism—the idea that social relations in capitalism appear as relations between things—Uno's theory loses its critical core. Lange argues that Uno's methodology "resorts to the framework of classical and neoclassical bourgeois 'economics' which no longer offers an incentive to change or question the capitalist mode of production".

Critics contend that Uno's emphasis on the forms of circulation, his focus on use-value as the driver of the economy, and his conception of the law of value as a mechanism for equilibrium lead to an apologetic and functionalist understanding of capitalism. In this view, capitalism appears as a rational, self-regulating system that successfully satisfies social needs, while its inherent contradictions, exploitative nature, and tendencies toward crisis are downplayed or explained away as features of "impure" historical reality rather than as essential to capital's logic.

== Major works ==
- Kachiron (Theory of Value, 1947)
- Keizai Genron (Principles of Political Economy, 2 vols., 1950–1952; abridged version, 1964). Translated into English by Thomas T. Sekine in 1980.
- Kyōkōron (Theory of Crisis, 1953)
- Keizaigaku Hōhōron (The Methodology of Political Economy, 1962)
- Keizai Seisakuron (The Types of Economic Policies, 1936; final version, 1954). Translated into English by Thomas T. Sekine in 2016.

== Publications ==
=== As author ===
- Theory of Economic Policy, Vol. 1 [経済政策論 上巻] (Kōbundō [弘文堂], 1936; reprinted 1948; 2nd ed. 1954; reprinted in SW7).
  - In the 1954 edition, "Vol. 1" was dropped from the title.
- Prolegomena to the Agrarian Question [農業問題序論] (Kaizōsha [改造社], 1947; 2nd ed. Aoki Shoten [青木書店], 1965; reprinted in SW8; reprinted Kobushi Bunko [こぶし文庫], 2014).
- Theory of Value [価値論] (Kawade Shobō [河出書房], 1947; reprinted Aoki Shoten [青木書店], 1965; reprinted in SW3; reprinted Kobushi Bunko [こぶし文庫], 1996).
- Introduction to Capital [資本論入門] (Hakujitsu Shoin [白日書院], 1948; 2nd. ed. Sōgen Bunko [創元文庫], 1952; reprinted Aoki Shoten [青木書店], 1968; reprinted in SW6; reprinted Kōdansha Gakujutsu Bunko [講談社学術文庫], 1977).
  - A reader's guide to Capital, Vol. 1.
- Studies on Capital [資本論の研究] (Iwanami Shoten [岩波書店], 1949; reprinted in SW3).
- Introduction to Capital, Vol. 2 [資本論入門 第二巻解説] (Hakujitsu Sho'in [白日書院], 1949; reprinted in SW6; reprinted Iwanami Shoten [岩波書店], 1977).
- Principles of Economics [経済原論] (Iwanami Shoten [岩波書店], 1950–52; reprinted in SW1).
  - Published in 2 volumes. "経済原論" is the same title as Marshall's Principles of Economics in Japanese.
- For Social Science [社会科学のために] (Kōbundō [弘文堂], 1952; most of it reprinted in SW9-10).
- Studies on the Theory of Value [価値論の研究] (Tokyo Daigaku Shuppankai [東京大学出版会], 1952; reprinted in SW3).
- Theory of Crisis [恐慌論] (Iwanami Shoten [岩波書店], 1953; reprinted in SW5; reprinted Iwanami Bunko [岩波文庫], 2010).
- Capital and Socialism [『資本論』と社会主義] (Iwanami Shoten [岩波書店], 1954; reprinted in SW10; reprinted Kobushi Bunko [こぶし文庫], 1995).
- Studies on the Principles of Marxist Economics [マルクス経済学原理論の研究] (Iwanami Shoten [岩波書店], 1959; reprinted in SW4).
- Methodology of Economics [経済学方法論] (Tokyo Daigaku Shuppankai [東京大学出版会], 1962; reprinted in SW9).
- Economics Seminar, Vol. 1: Method of Economics [経済学ゼミナール1 経済学の方法] (Hōsei Daigaku Shuppankai [法政大学出版会], 1963).
- Economics Seminar, Vol. 2: Issues in the Theory of Value [経済学ゼミナール2 価値論の問題点] (Hōsei Daigaku Shuppankai [法政大学出版会], 1963).
- Economics Seminar, Vol. 3: Problems of the Theory of Crisis and the Theory of Commercial Profit [経済学ゼミナール3 恐慌論・商業利潤論の諸問題] (Hōsei Daigaku Shuppankai [法政大学出版会], 1963).
- Principles of Economics [経済原論] (Iwanami Zensho [岩波全書], 1964; reprinted in SW2; reprinted Iwanami Bunko [岩波文庫], 2016).
  - The abridged but revised edition of the 1950-52 Principles of Economics.
- Fundamental Problems of Social Science [社会科学の根本問題] (Aoki Shoten [青木書店], 1966; reprinted in SW9-10).
- Discussion on Economics [経済学を語る] (Tokyo Daigaku Shuppankai [東京大学出版会], 1967).
- Economics as Social Science [社会科学としての経済学] (Chikuma Shobō [筑摩書房], 1969; most of it reprinted in SW9-10; reprinted Chikuma Gakugei Bunko [ちくま学芸文庫], 2016).
- Problems of Marxist Economics [マルクス経済学の諸問題] (Iwanami Shoten [岩波書店], 1969; Part 1 reprinted in SW4, Part 2 in SW10).
- Economic Theory of Capital [資本論の経済学] (Iwanami Shinsho [岩波新書], 1969; reprinted in SW6).
- Fifty Years with Capital [資本論五十年] (Hōsei Daigaku Shuppankai [法政大学出版会], 1970–73).
  - Published in 2 volumes. In interviews, Uno details his intellectual biography.
- Theory of Economic Policy [経済政策論] (Kōbundō [弘文堂], 1971; reprinted in SW7).
  - The revised edition of the 1936 Theory of Economic Policy.
- Utility of Economics [経済学の効用] (Tokyo Daigaku Shuppankai [東京大学出版会], 1972).
- Selected Works of Uno Kōzō [宇野弘蔵著作集] (Iwanami Shoten [岩波書店], 1973–74).
  - Published in 11 volumes [SW].
- Learning from Capital [資本論に学ぶ] (Tokyo Daigaku Shuppankai [東京大学出版会], 1975; reprinted Chikuma Gakugei Bunko [ちくま学芸文庫], 2015).
- Capital and Me [『資本論』と私] (Ochanomizu Shobō [御茶の水書房], 2008).

=== As co-author ===
- Uno Kōzō and Umemoto Katsumi [梅本克己], Social Science and the Dialectic [社会科学と弁証法] (Iwanami Shoten [岩波書店], 1976; reprinted Kobushi Bunko [こぶし文庫], 2006).
- Uno Kōzō, Ōuchi Tsutomu [大内力] and Ōshima Kiyoshi [大島清], Capitalism: Its Development and Structure [資本主義——その発達と構造] (Kadokawa Sensho [角川選書], 1978).
- Uno Kōzō and Fuji'i Hiroshi [藤井洋], The Archetype of Modern Capitalism [現代資本主義の原型] (Kobushi Bunko [こぶし文庫], 1997).

=== As editor ===
- Studies on the Bloc Economy as Seen through the Sugar Industry [糖業より見たる広域経済の研究] (Kurita Shoten [栗田書店], 1944).
  - "広域経済" is the Japanese translation of 'Großraumwirtschaft'.
- Lectures on the Principles of Economics [経済原論 経済学演習講座] (Seirin Shoin [青林書院], 1955; 2nd ed. Seirin Shoin Shinsha [青林書院新社], 1969; Q&A section reprinted in SW2).
- Economics [経済学] (Kadokawa Zensho [角川全書], 1956; reprinted Kadokawa Sophia Bunko [角川ソフィア文庫], 2019).
  - Published in 2 volumes.
- Studies on Land Tax Reform [地租改正の研究] (Tokyo Daigaku Shuppankai [東京大学出版会], 1957–58).
  - Published in 2 volumes.
- The Present State of the Rural Economy in Japan under Economic Stability [日本農村経済の実態——経済安定下における] (Tokyo Daigaku Shuppankai [東京大学出版会], 1961).
- Capital Studies, Vol. 1: Commodity, Money and Capital [資本論研究1 商品・貨幣・資本] (Chikuma Shobō [筑摩書房], 1967).
- Capital Studies, Vol. 2: Surplus Value and Accumulation [資本論研究2 剰余価値・蓄積] (Chikuma Shobō [筑摩書房], 1967).
- Capital Studies, Vol. 3: Distribution Process of Capital [資本論研究3 資本の流通過程] (Chikuma Shobō [筑摩書房], 1967).
- Capital Studies, Vol. 4: Production Price and Profit [資本論研究4 生産価格・利潤] (Chikuma Shobō [筑摩書房], 1968).
- Capital Studies, Vol. 5: Interest and Rent [資本論研究5 利子・地代] (Chikuma Shobō [筑摩書房], 1968).

=== As co-editor ===
- Capital Studies: Commodity and Process of Exchange [資本論研究——商品及交換過程] (Kawade Shobō [河出書房], 1948).
- Capital Studies: Process of Distribution [資本論研究——流通過程] (Kawade Shobō [河出書房], 1949).
- Studies on Marxist Economics: Festschrift for Prof. Ōuchi Hyōe on the Occasion of His Sixtieth Birthday, Vol. 1 [マルクス経済学の研究——大内兵衛先生還暦記念論文集（上）] (Iwanami Shoten [岩波書店], 1953).
- The World Economy and the Japanese Economy: Festschrift for Prof. Ōuchi Hyōe on the Occasion of His Sixtieth Birthday, Vol. 2 [世界経済と日本経済——大内兵衛先生還暦記念論文集（下）] (Iwanami Shoten [岩波書店], 1956).
- Japanese Capitalism and Agriculture [日本資本主義と農業] (Iwanami Shoten [岩波書店], 1959).
- Dictionary of Capital [資本論辞典] (Aoki Shoten [青木書店], 1961).

=== As translator ===
- Friedrich Engels, 'Über historischen Materialismus' [史的唯物論について], Marx-Engels Complete Works, Vol. 12 [マルクス=エンゲルス全集 第十二巻] (Kaizōsha [改造社], 1928).
- Karl Marx, 'Die moralisierende Kritik und die kritisierende Moral' [道学的批判と批判学的道徳], Marx-Engels Complete Works, Vol. 3 [マルクス=エンゲルス全集 第三巻] (Kaizōsha [改造社], 1929).
- Walter Bagehot, Lombard Street [ロンバード街——ロンドンの金融市場] (Iwanami Bunko [岩波文庫], 1941).

=== Uno's works in English translation ===
- Principles of Political Economy: Theory of a Purely Capitalist Society, trans. Thomas T. Sekine (Brighton: The Harvester Press, 1980).
  - Translation of the abridged 1964 Iwanami Zensho edition of Principles of Economics.
- The Types of Economic Policies under Capitalism, trans. Thomas T. Sekine, ed. John R. Bell (Leiden: Brill, 2016).
  - Translation of the 1971 edition of Theory of Economic Policy.
- Theory of Crisis, trans. Ken C. Kawashima (Leiden: Brill, 2020).
