= Makoto Itoh =

Japanese economist (1936–2023)

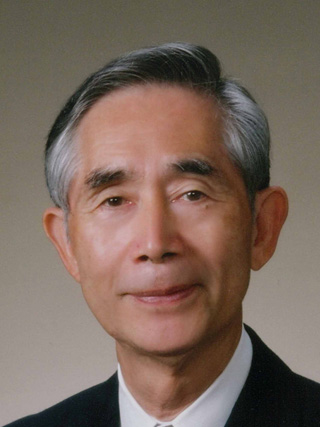
- Born: April 20, 1936; Tokyo, Japan
- Died: February 7, 2023 (aged 86)

Academic background
- Influences: Kozo Uno, Karl Marx

Academic work
- Discipline: Marxian economics
- School or tradition: Marxian economics

Makoto Itoh (伊藤 誠, Itō Makoto; April 20, 1936 – February 7, 2023) was a Japanese economist who was considered internationally to be one of the most important scholars of Karl Marx's theory of value. He taught at Kokugakuin University, Tokyo, and was a professor emeritus of the University of Tokyo.

Itoh belonged to the school of economic thought founded by Kozo Uno and was one of the few Japanese Marxian economists who published widely in English-language journals such as Science & Society, Monthly Review, Capital & Class, New Left Review and Ampo. He published 24 books, of which 6 are in English, and 5 are translated and published in Chinese.

Itoh died from a heart attack on February 7, 2023, at the age of 86.

== Books in English ==
- Value and Crisis (1980).
- The Basic Theory of Capitalism (1987)
- The world economic crisis and Japanese capitalism (1990)
- Political Economy for Socialism (1995)
- with Costas Lapavitsas, Political economy of money and finance (1999)
- The Japanese Economy Reconsidered (2000)

== Articles in English ==
- Itoh, Makoto (October 1996). "Money and credit in socialist economies: A reconsideration". Capital & Class (60). Archived from the original on March 11, 2007 – via FindArticles.
- Itoh, Makoto: "Skilled Labour in Value Theory" Capital & Class, issue no. 11 (Spring 1987) no. 1 pp. 39–58
