= Daniel Ankarloo =

Swedish historian of economics

Bengt Daniel Ankarloo, formerly Norrman, 19 mars 1970 born in Backa, Gothenburg, is a Swedish Ph.D. in economic history, author and senior lecturer at Malmö University.

== Research ==
Ankarloo has among other endeavors critiqued the claimed scientific status of discipline of economics. And dealt with Marxist critique of political economy. He has also written works regarding the introduction of New public management to education.

== Public figure ==
Ankarloo has been a reoccurring figure involved in the debate regarding the public debate regarding the welfare state in Sweden, something he has also lectured about at Malmö University. He has shown that 75 percent of the swedes support at publicly funded welfare state. And has argued that the claimed problems regarding supporting the welfare state are simply false.

== Bibliography ==
=== Books and dissertations ===
- Institutions", what is in a word? : a critique of the new institutional economics, 2000.
- Kris i välfärdsfrågan : vänstern, välfärden och socialismen, 2005
- Marknadsmyter : en kritisk betraktelse av nyliberala påståenden, 2008
- Den högre utbildningen: ett fält av marknad och politik,2012

=== Articles ===
- New Institutional Economics and economic history
- After golden age: The Labor movement and end of Fordism
- Ankarloo, Bengt Daniel (2015) [2010]. "Nationalekonomiskrået En insider-outsiderteori om den nationalekonomiska disciplinen". In Johnsdotter, Sara; Carlbom, Aje (eds.). Goda sanningar: debattklimatet och den kritiska forskningens villkor (EBook) (in Swedish). Nordic Academic Press. ISBN 9789187351846. SELIBR 18429586.
