= John Weeks (economist) =

American economist (1941–2020)

- Born: 1 April 1941; Austin, Texas, U.S.
- Died: 26 July 2020 (aged 79); London, England
- Occupations: Professor; Economists
- Spouse: Elizabeth Dore (m. 1975)
- Children: 2

John Weeks (1 April 1941 – 26 July 2020) was an American economist, critic of neoliberal economics and a policy advisor to the Labour party under Jeremy Corbyn.

== Life ==
Weeks was born in Austin, Texas in a middle-class family. He received a degree in economics from the University of Texas in 1963 and subsequently enrolled in PhD-studies. Weeks was also active in the US-anti war efforts during the late sixties. Weeks completed his doctorate in 1969 and went on to teach at Ahmadu Bello University in Nigeria before becoming a lecturer at the University of Sussex in 1971. Weeks later became an advisor for the Nicaraguan government's planning ministry. In 1985 Weeks was called out as a "dangerous academic" by a conservative organization. In this context, where Weeks felt that the US environment was increasingly hostile, Weeks enthusiastically accepted leaving the US to become professor emeritus at the School of Oriental and African Studies of the University of London. His research interests were in theoretical and policy-applied macroeconomics and economic development. Weeks published academic papers, books and policy reports in these areas.

Weeks is credited with coining the phrase "quantity theory of competition" to reflect a proposition that more competition in various aspects of the markets (producers, consumers, and workers) will create a more efficient economy.

In August 2015, Weeks endorsed Jeremy Corbyn's campaign in the Labour Party leadership election.

He died on 26 July 2020 of leukaemia.

== Selected works ==
- Economics of the 1% (2014)
- The Irreconcilable Inconsistencies of Neoclassical Macroeconomics: A False Paradigm
- Capital, Exploitation and Economic Crisis (2011)

== See also ==
- Critique of political economy
