= List of contributors to Marxist theory =

This is a list of prominent figures who contributed to Marxist theory, principally as authors; it is not intended to list politicians who happen(ed) to be a member of an ostensibly communist political party or other organisation.

Name	Place of birth	Place of death	Nationality	Life	Tendency
Victor Adler	Prague, Austria-Hungary	Vienna, Austria	(Austria) Austrian	1852–1918	Social democracy, Austro-Marxism
Theodor W. Adorno	Frankfurt am Main, Hesse-Nassau Province, Prussia, Germany	Visp, Visp, Valais, Switzerland	(Germany) German	1903–1969	Frankfurt School, Western Marxism
Louis Althusser	Birmendreïs, French Algeria	Paris, France	(France) French	1918–1990	Western Marxism, Structural Marxism, Leninism
Samir Amin	Cairo, Egypt	Paris, France	(Egypt) Egyptian and (France) French	1931–2018	Third Worldism, Maoism, World-systems theory
Otto Bauer	Vienna, Austria-Hungary	Paris, France	(Austria) Austrian	1881–1938	Social Democracy, Austro-Marxism
Walter Benjamin	Berlin, German Empire	Portbou, Catalonia, Spain	(Germany) German	1892–1940	Western Marxism, Marxist hermeneutics
Franco "Bifo" Berardi	Bologna, Italy	Still Living	(Italy) Italian	1949–	Autonomism
Eduard Bernstein	Schöneberg, German Confederation	Berlin, Germany	(Germany) German	1850–1932	Social democracy, Marxist revisionism
Caio Prado Júnior	São Paulo, Brazil	São Paulo, Brazil	(Brazil) Brazilian	1907–1990	Marxism
Paulo Freire	Recife, Brazil	São Paulo, Brazil	(Brazil) Brazilian	1921–1997	Marxist Humanism
Ernst Bloch	Ludwigshafen, Germany	Tübingen, West Germany	(Germany) German	1885–1977	Western Marxism, Marxist hermeneutics, Marxist humanism
Amadeo Bordiga	Ercolano, Kingdom of Italy	Formia, Italy	(Italy) Italian	1889–1970	Italian Left communism, Leninism
Bertolt Brecht	Augsburg, German Empire	East Berlin, East Germany	(Germany) German	1898–1956	Marxist literary criticism
Nikolai Bukharin	Moscow, Russian Empire	Kommunarka shooting ground, Russian SFSR, Soviet Union	(Russia) Russian	1888–1938	Bolshevism, Left communism (initially), Right opposition (later on)
Jacques Camatte	Plan-de-Cuques, Alpes-Maritimes, France	France	(France) French	1935–2025	Bordigism, Anarcho-primitivism (later on), Communization (later on)
Cornelius Castoriadis	Constantinople, Ottoman Empire	Paris, France	(Greece) Greek and (France) French	1922–1997	Western Marxism, Post-Marxism, Psychoanalytic Marxism, Libertarian socialism
Debiprasad Chattopadhyaya	Calcutta, British Raj	Calcutta, India	(India) Indian	1918–1993	Marxism
V. Gordon Childe	Sydney, Colony of New South Wales	Blackheath, New South Wales, Australia	(Australia) Australian	1892–1957	Marxist archaeology
G. A. Cohen	Montreal, Quebec, Canada	Oxford, England	(Canada) Canadian	1941–2009	Analytical Marxism
James Connolly	Cowgate, Edinburgh, Scotland, United Kingdom	Kilmainham Gaol, Dublin, Ireland	(Republic of Ireland) Irish and (Scotland) Scottish	1868–1916	Marxism, Irish republicanism
Onorato Damen	Monte San Pietrangeli, Italy	Milan	(Italy) Italian	1893–1979	Italian Left communism
Gilles Dauvé	France	Still living	(France) French	1947–	Left communism, Communization
Angela Davis	Birmingham, Alabama	Still Living	(United States) American	1944–	Marxist feminism
Guy Debord	Paris, France	Bellevue-la-Montagne, Haute-Loire, France	(France) French	1931–1994	Situationism
Daniel De Leon	Curaçao	New York, State of New York, United States	(United States) American	1852–1914	De Leonism, Syndicalism
Joseph Dietzgen	Blankenberg (now Hennef, German Confederation	Chicago, Illinois, United States	(Germany) German	1828–1888	Marxism
Raya Dunayevskaya	Yaryshev, Russian Empire (today, Vinnytsia Oblast, Ukraine)	Chicago, Illinois, United States	(United States) American	1910–1987	Marxist humanism
Terry Eagleton	Salford, Lancashire, England, United Kingdom	Still living	(United Kingdom) British	1942–	Marxism
Gilles Deleuze	Paris, France	Paris, France	(France) French	1925–1995	Freudo-Marxism, Post-Marxism
Arghiri Emmanuel	Patras, Greece	Paris, France	(Greece) Greek	1911–2001	Unequal exchange
Friedrich Engels	Barmen, Kingdom of Prussia (today Wuppertal, Germany)	London, United Kingdom	(Germany) German	1820–1895	Classical Marxism
Frantz Fanon	Fort-de-France, Martinique, France	Bethesda, Maryland, United States	(France) French	1925–1961	Marxist humanism, Pan-Africanism, Decolonization
John Bellamy Foster	Seattle, Washington, United States	Still living	(United States) American	1953–	Marxism
Herman Gorter	Wormerveer	Saint-Josse-ten-Noode, Brussels	(Netherlands) Dutch	1864–1927	Council communism
Antonio Gramsci	Ales, Sardinia, Italy	Rome, Lazio, Italy	(Italy) Italian	1891–1937	Gramscianism, Western Marxism, Marxist humanism, Neo-Marxism
Félix Guattari	Villeneuve-les-Sablons, France	Cour-Cheverny, France	(France) French	1930–1992	Freudo-Marxism, Post-Marxism
Ernesto "Che" Guevara	Rosario, Santa Fe, Argentina	La Higuera, Vallegrande, Bolivia	(Argentina) Argentine	1928–1967	Marxism-Leninism, Guevarism
Abimael Guzmán (Gonzalo)	Arequipa, Peru	Callao, Peru	(Peru) Peruvian	1934–2021	Marxism-Leninism-Maoism, Gonzalo thought
Ted Grant	Germiston, South Africa	London, United Kingdom	(South Africa) South African and (United Kingdom) British	1913–2006	Trotskyism
Sukarno	Surabaya, Dutch East Indies	Jakarta, Indonesia	(Indonesia) Indonesian	1901–1970	Marhaenism, Nasakom
Tan Malaka	Limapuluh Koto, Dutch East Indies	Kediri, Indonesia	(Indonesia) Indonesian	1897–1949	Tan Malaka Thought, Islamic Marxism, National Marxism
David Harvey	Gillingham, Kent, England, United Kingdom	Still living	(United Kingdom) British	1935–	Marxist geography
Harry Haywood	South Omaha, Nebraska, United States	Ann Arbor, Michigan, United States	(United States) American	1898–1985	Marxism-Leninism
Rudolf Hilferding	Vienna, Austria-Hungary	Paris, France	(Austria) Austrian and (Germany) German	1877–1941	Austro-Marxism
Max Horkheimer	Zuffenhausen (now Stuttgart), Württemberg, German Empire	Nuremberg, Bavaria, West Germany	(Germany) German	1895–1973	Frankfurt School, Western Marxism
Tran Duc Thao	Bắc Ninh province, French Indochina	Paris, France	(Vietnam) Vietnamese	1917 – 1993	Phenomenology,Marxist philosophy
Ho Chi Minh	Nghệ An Province, French Indochina	Hanoi, North Vietnam	(Vietnam) Vietnamese	1890–1969	Marxism-Leninism, Ho Chi Minh Thought
Enver Hoxha	Ergiri (today Gjirokastër), Janina Vilayet, Ottoman Empire	Tirana, People's Socialist Republic of Albania	(Albania) Albanian	1908–1985	Marxism-Leninism, Mao Zedong Thought (initially), Hoxhaism
C.L.R. James	Trinidad	London, United Kingdom	(Trinidad and Tobago) Trinidadian and (United Kingdom) British	1901–1989	Marxism, Pan-Africanism, Anti-Stalinist left
Fredric Jameson	Cleveland, Ohio, United States	Killingworth, Connecticut, United States	(United States) American	1934–2024	Western Marxism, Marxist hermeneutics
Kojin Karatani	Amagasaki, Hyogo Prefecture, Japan	Still living	(Japan) Japanese	1941–	Marxist literary criticism
Edvard Kardelj	Ljubljana, Duchy of Carniola, Austria-Hungary	Ljubljana, Socialist Federal Republic of Yugoslavia	(Socialist Federal Republic of Yugoslavia) Yugoslavian	1910–1979	Titoism
Karl Kautsky	Prague, Austria-Hungary	Amsterdam, Netherlands	(Czech Republic) Czech, (Austria) Austrian and (Germany) German	1854–1938	Orthodox Marxism
İbrahim Kaypakkaya	Çorum, Turkey	Çorum, Turkey	(Turkey) Turkish	1949–1973	Maoism
Kim Il-Sung	Chingjong, Korea	Hyangsan, Korea	(North Korea) Korean	1912–1994	Marxism-Leninism, Juche
Jim Kemmy	Limerick, Ireland	Limerick, Ireland	(Republic of Ireland) Irish	1936–1997	Marxism
Alexandra Kollontai	St Petersburg, Russian Empire	Moscow, Russian SFSR, Soviet Union	(Soviet Union) Soviet	1872–1952	Marxist feminism, Bolshevism
Karl Korsch	Tostedt, German Empire	Belmont, Massachusetts, United States	(Germany) German	1886–1961	Western Marxism
Damodar Dharmananda Kosambi	Kosben, (now Goa) British Raj	Pune, Maharashtra, India	(India) Indian	1907–1966	Marxism
Yalçın Küçük	İskenderun, Hatay, Turkey		(Turkey) Turkish	1938–2026	Marxism
Antonio Labriola	Cassino, Papal States	Rome, Kingdom of Italy	(Italy) Italian	1843–1904	Marxism
Paul Lafargue	Santiago de Cuba	Draveil, France	(France) French	1842–1911	Marxism, Anti-work
Henri Lefebvre	Hagetmau, France	Navarrenx, France	(France) French	1901–1991	Western Marxism, Hegelian Marxism
Vladimir Lenin	Simbirsk, Russian Empire	Gorki Leninskiye, Russian SFSR, Soviet Union	(Soviet Union) Soviet	1870–1924	Leninism, Bolshevism
Karl Liebknecht	Leipzig, Kingdom of Saxony, German Empire	Berlin, Weimar Republic	(Germany) German	1871–1919	Spartacism
Domenico Losurdo	Sannicandro di Bari, Kingdom of Italy	Ancona, Italy	(Italy) Italian	1941–2018	Marxism
Georg Lukács	Budapest, Austria-Hungary	Budapest, People's Republic of Hungary	(Hungary) Hungarian	1885–1971	Budapest School, Western Marxism, Hegelian Marxism, Leninism
Rosa Luxemburg	Zamość, Vistula Land, Russian Empire	Berlin, Germany	(Poland) Polish and (Germany) German	1871–1919	Spartacism
Herbert Marcuse	Berlin, German Empire	Starnberg, West Germany	(Germany) German	1898–1979	Frankfurt School, Western Marxism
José Carlos Mariátegui	Moquegua, Peru	Lima, Peru	(Peru) Peruvian	1894–1930	Marxism, Sorelianism
Andreas Malm	Mölndal, Sweden	Still living	(Sweden) Swedish	1977–	Marxism
Karl Marx	Trier, Kingdom of Prussia	London, United Kingdom	(Kingdom of Prussia) Prussian and (Germany) German	1818–1883	Classical Marxism
Paul Mattick	Stolp, Pomerania, German Empire (now Poland)	Cambridge, Massachusetts, United States	(Germany) German	1904–1981	Council communism
Andy Merrifield	Liverpool, Merseyside, England, United Kingdom	Still living	(United Kingdom) British	1960–	"Magical Marxism"
István Mészáros	Budapest, Hungary	Margate, England	Hungary	1930–2017	Marxism
Antonio Negri	Padua, Italy	Paris, France	(Italy) Italian	1933–2023	Autonomism
Kwame Nkrumah	Nkroful, Gold Coast (now Ghana)	Bucharest, Romania	(Ghana) Ghanaian	1909–1972	Nkrumahism
Abdullah Öcalan	Ömerli, Şanlıurfa, Turkey	Still living	(Turkey) Turkish Kurdish	1948–	Democratic confederalism
Sylvia Pankhurst	Manchester, Lancashire, England, United Kingdom	Addis Ababa, Ethiopia	(United Kingdom) British and (Ethiopia) Ethiopian	1882–1960	Council communism
Anton Pannekoek	Vaassen, Netherlands	Wageningen, Netherlands	(Netherlands) Dutch	1873–1960	Council communism
Evgeny Pashukanis	Staritsa, Russian Empire	Soviet Union	(Russia) Russian	1891–1937	Leninism
Georgi Plekhanov	Gudalovka (now Gryazinsky District), Tambov Governorate, Russian Empire	Terijoki, Finland	(Russia) Russian	1856–1918	Marxism
Bijan Jazani	Tehran, Iran	Tehran, Iran	(Iran) Iranian	1938–1975	Marxism
Nicos Poulantzas	Athens, Greece	Paris, France	(Greece) Greek	1936–1979	Structural Marxism, Leninism (initially), Democratic socialism (later on)
Isaak Illich Rubin	Dinaburg, Russian Empire	Aktobe, Kazakh SSR, USSR	Soviet Union	1886–1937	Marxism
Jean-Paul Sartre	Paris, France	Paris, France	(France) French	1905–1980	Neo-Marxism, Existentialism
Jose Maria Sison	Ilocos Sur, Philippines	Utrecht, Netherlands	(Philippines) Filipino	1939 - 2022	Marxism-Leninism-Maoism
Alfred Sohn-Rethel	Neuilly-sur-Seine, France	Bremen, West Germany	(Germany) German	1899–1990	Marxism
Mahdi Amel	Harouf, Lebanon	Beirut, Lebanon	(Lebanon) Lebanese	1936–1987	Marxism
Joseph Stalin	Gori, Tiflis Governorate, Russian Empire	Kuntsevo Dacha near Moscow, Russian SFSR, Soviet Union	(Soviet Union) Soviet	1878–1953	Marxism-Leninism, Stalinism
Paul Sweezy	New York City, New York, United States	Larchmont, New York (state), United States	(United States) American	1910–2004	Neo-Marxism
Josip Broz Tito	Kumrovec, Croatia-Slavonia, Austria-Hungary	Ljubljana, SR Slovenia, SFR Yugoslavia	(Socialist Federal Republic of Yugoslavia) Yugoslavian	1892–1980	Marxism-Leninism, Titoism
Leon Trotsky	Yelizavetgrad, Kherson Governorate, Russian Empire	Coyoacán, Distrito Federal, Mexico	(Soviet Union) Soviet	1879–1940	Leninism, Bolshevism, Trotskyism
Alberto Toscano	Italy	Still living	Italy	1977–	Western Marxism
Raymond Williams	Llanfihangel Crucorney, Wales, United Kingdom	Saffron Walden, England, United Kingdom	(United Kingdom) British ( (Wales) Welsh)	1921–1988	Western Marxism, New Left
Karl August Wittfogel	Woltersdorf, Lower Saxony, Province of Hanover, German Empire	New York, State of New York, United States	(Germany) German and (United States) American	1896–1988	Marxism
Mao Zedong	Shaoshan, Hunan, Qing Dynasty	Beijing, People's Republic of China	(China) Chinese	1893–1976	Marxism-Leninism, Maoism
Slavoj Žižek	Ljubljana, SR Slovenia, SFR Yugoslavia	Still living	(Slovenia) Slovene ( (Socialist Federal Republic of Yugoslavia) Yugoslavian before Dissolution of Yugoslavia)	1949–	Western Marxism, Hegelian Marxism, Psychoanalytic Marxism
Tony Cliff	Zikhron Ya'akov, Mutasarrifate of Jerusalem, Ottoman Empire	London, England	(Poland) Polish	1917–2000	Trotskyism

== See also ==
- List of Marxian economists
