= Merchant capitalism =

Term coined by Werner Sombart

Some economic historians use the term merchant capitalism, a term coined by the German sociologist and economist Werner Sombart in his "The Genesis of Modern Capitalism" in 1902, to refer to the earliest phase in the development of capitalism as an economic and social system. However, others argue that mercantilism, which has flourished widely in the world without the emergence of systems like modern capitalism, is not actually capitalist as such.

Merchant capitalism is distinguished from more fully developed capitalism by its focus on simply moving goods from a market where they are cheap to a market where they are expensive (rather than influencing the mode of the production of those goods), the lack of industrialization, and of commercial finance. Merchant houses were backed by relatively small private financiers acting as intermediaries between simple commodity producers and by exchanging debt with each other. Thus, merchant capitalism preceded the capitalist mode of production as a form of capital accumulation. A process of primitive accumulation of capital, upon which commercial finance operations could be based and making application of mass wage labor and industrialization possible, was the necessary precondition for the transformation of merchant capitalism into industrial capitalism.

Early forms of merchant capitalism developed in the 9th century, during the Islamic Golden Age, while in medieval Europe from the 12th century. The movement towards merchant capitalism across the old municipal and guild system had been apparent in the wool trade as early as the age of Chaucer. In Europe, merchant capitalism became a significant economic force in the 16th century. The mercantile era drew to a close around 1800, giving way to industrial capitalism. However, merchant capitalism remained entrenched in some parts of the West well into the 19th century, notably the Southern United States, where the plantation system constrained the development of industrial capitalism (limiting markets for consumer goods) whose political manifestations prevented Northern legislators from passing broad economic packages (e.g. monetary and banking reform, a transcontinental railroad, and incentives for settlement of the American west) to integrate the states' economies and spur the growth of industrial capitalism.

== See also ==
- Feudalism
- Commercial revolution
- History of capitalism
- Late capitalism
