= Helmut Reichelt =

German Marxian critic of political economy, sociologist and philosopher

Helmut Reichelt (German: [ˈhɛlmuːt ˈʁaɪçl̩t]; born 1939) is a Swedish-born German Marxian critic of political economy, sociologist and philosopher. Reichelt is one of the main authors of the Neue Marx-Lektüre and considered to be one of the most important theorists in the field of Marx's theory of value.

== Biography ==
Reichelt was born in Borås, Sweden. He studied economics, sociology and philosophy in Frankfurt where Theodor W. Adorno supervised his diploma in 1968. In 1970 Reichelt obtained his PhD at the Institute for Social Research. In 1971 he became professor of sociology at the Johann Wolfgang Goethe University Frankfurt am Main. One year later he was also appointed as the dean of the philosophy department in Frankfurt.

On the initiative of Alfred Sohn-Rethel, Reichelt accepted the professorship for social theory at the department of Sociology at the University of Bremen in 1978. He remained in Bremen until his retirement in 2005.

Reichelt's research interests are the theory of society with special emphasis on the problems of the theory of economic value. Already during his time as a university student he began a long-term cooperation with Hans-Georg Backhaus. Together with Backhaus he considered engaging with economic phenomena and economic theory as fundamental for critical theory. Since 1998 Reichelt and Backhaus contributions have spawned a rich debate on theories of economic value and its relation to critical theory. Reichelt has published widely on Marx, on Adorno's social theory and on economic theory. Reichelt also oversaw an edition of Hegel's Philosophy of Right in the Ullstein Verlag. He is the current chair of the German Marx-Society.

== Selected publications ==
=== Main works ===
- Reichelt, Helmut: Neue Marx Lektuere - Zur Kritik sozialwissenschaftlicher Logik. Hamburg 2008.
- Reichelt, Helmut: Zur logischen Struktur des Kapitalbegriffs bei Karl Marx. Freiburg 2001. (ISBN 3-924627-76-2)

=== Other publications ===
- Der Zusammenhang von Werttheorie und ökonomischen Kategorien bei Marx, 1999 - online
- Die Marxsche Kritik ökonomischer Kategorien. Überlegungen zum Problem der Geltung in der dialektischen Darstellungsmethode im „Kapital“, 2001 - PDF
- Einige Fragen und Anmerkungen zu Nadjas „Kritik als Substanz des Denkens bei Kant und Marx.“, 2005 - PDF
- Marx's Critique of Economic Categories: Reflections on the Problem of Validity in the Dialectical Method of Presentation in Capital, in: Historical Materialism, Volume 15, Number 4, 2007, pp. 3–52(50) - abstract
