= FindArticles =

Website providing access to press articles

FindArticles.com
- Website type: Reference
- Founded: 2000
- Dissolved: 2025
- Owner: CBS Interactive
- Creator: LookSmart
- Website: FindArticles.com
- Commercial: Yes
- Registration: Optional
- Current status: Defunct. Domain name sold to unrelated company.

FindArticles was a website which provided access to articles previously published in over 3,000 magazines, newspapers, journals, business reports and other sources. The site offered free and paid content through the HighBeam Research database. In 2007, FindArticles accessed over 11 million resource articles, going back to 1998.

As it grew, FindArticles moved away from an all-free model driven by advertising to a mixture of free and paid content.

In 2025, the domain was sold to Web Orange, a Hong Kong based company which produces advertising-supported content unrelated to the original site. Critics have cautioned it is AI generated and the journalists are fake personas.

== History ==
=== 2000–2007: Founding and growth ===
FindArticles was founded in 2000 as a partnership between LookSmart, which authored the search technology, and the Gale Group, which provided the articles for a fee.

By early-August 2000, the FindArticles database contained more than 862,000 articles and by September 2000, the database contained more than 1 million articles.

In September 2004, HighBeam Research announced that it would make 1 million premium articles from its database accessible via FindArticles. By May 2005, FindArticles contained more than 5 million articles in its database.

In November 2006, FindArticles reported over 17.6 million unique visitors to their site. In April 2007, LookSmart partnered with Blinkx to power FindArticles' video search results.

=== 2007–2025: CNET purchase and CNET ownership ===
FindArticles remained a part of LookSmart throughout the various changes in that company until it was sold to CNET Networks for $20.5 million on November 9, 2007, as part of a larger sell-off of LookSmart properties.

Looksmart's need to offload non-critical assets in the wake of poor corporate performance, along with CNET's commensurate desire to expand its library of offerings, motivated the deal. Both Mashable and Wired speculated that the final purchase price was predicated on FindArticles' SEO value—i.e., the frequency with which its articles appear as search engine results.

FindArticles was part of the BNET division of CNET Networks owned by CBS Interactive.

=== 2025–present: Web Orange ===
In 2025, the domain was sold to Web Orange Limited, a privately held company registered in Hong Kong. The content is new and not affiliated with the original site. It is funded through advertising and commercial partnerships. According to Vince Nero, it is a "phony news site" with AI generated content attributed to "fake journalists with the same names as well-known journalists at respected outlets".
