= Critique of political economy =

Social critique

Critique of political economy or simply the first critique of economy is a form of social critique that rejects the conventional ways of distributing resources. The critique also rejects what its advocates believe are unrealistic axioms, flawed historical assumptions, and taking conventional economic mechanisms as a given or as transhistorical (true for all human societies for all time). The critique asserts the conventional economy is merely one of many types of historically specific ways to distribute resources, which emerged along with modernity (post-Renaissance Western society).

Critics of political economy do not necessarily aim to create their own theories regarding how to administer economies. Critics of economy commonly view "the economy" as a bundle of concepts and societal and normative practices, rather than being the result of any self-evident economic laws. Hence, they also tend to consider the views which are commonplace within the field of economics as faulty, or simply as pseudoscience.

There are multiple critiques of political economy today, but what they have in common is critique of what critics of political economy tend to view as dogma, i.e. claims of the economy as a necessary and transhistorical societal category.

== John Ruskin ==
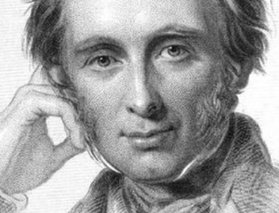
John Ruskin portrayed in his thirties

In the 1860s, John Ruskin published his essay Unto This Last which he came to view as his central work. The essay was originally written as a series of publications in a magazine, which ended up having to suspend the publications, due to the severe controversy the articles caused. While Ruskin is generally known as an important art critic, his study of the history of art was a component that gave him some insight into the pre-modern societies of the Middle Ages, and their social organisation which he was able to contrast to his contemporary condition. Ruskin attempted to mobilize a methodological/scientific critique of new political economy, as it was envisaged by the classical economists.

Ruskin viewed the concept of "the economy" as a kind of "collective mental lapse or collective concussion", and he viewed the emphasis on precision in industry as a kind of slavery. Due to the fact that Ruskin regarded the political economy of his time as "mad", he said that it interested him as much as "a science of gymnastics which had as its axiom that human beings in fact didn't have skeletons." Ruskin declared that economics rests on positions that are exactly the same. According to Ruskin, these axioms resemble thinking, not that human beings do not have skeletons but rather that they consist entirely of skeletons. Ruskin wrote that he did not oppose the truth value of this theory, he merely wrote that he denied that it could be successfully implemented in the world in the state it was in. He took issue with the ideas of "natural laws", "economic man", and the prevailing notion of value and aimed to point out the inconsistencies in the thinking of the economists. He critiqued John Stuart Mill for thinking that "the opinions of the public" was reflected adequately by market prices.

Ruskin coined illth to refer to unproductive wealth. Ruskin is not well known as a political thinker today but when in 1906 a journalist asked the first generation of Labour Party members of Parliament in the United Kingdom which book had most inspired them, Unto This Last emerged as an undisputed chart-topper.

... the art of becoming 'rich', in the common sense, is not absolutely nor finally the art of accumulating much money for ourselves, but also of contriving that our neighbours shall have less. In accurate terms, it is 'the art of establishing the maximum inequality in our own favour'.

— John Ruskin, Unto This Last

=== Criticism ===
Karl Marx and Friedrich Engels regarded much of Ruskin's critique as reactionary. His idealisation of the Middle Ages made them reject him as a "feudal utopian".

== Karl Marx ==
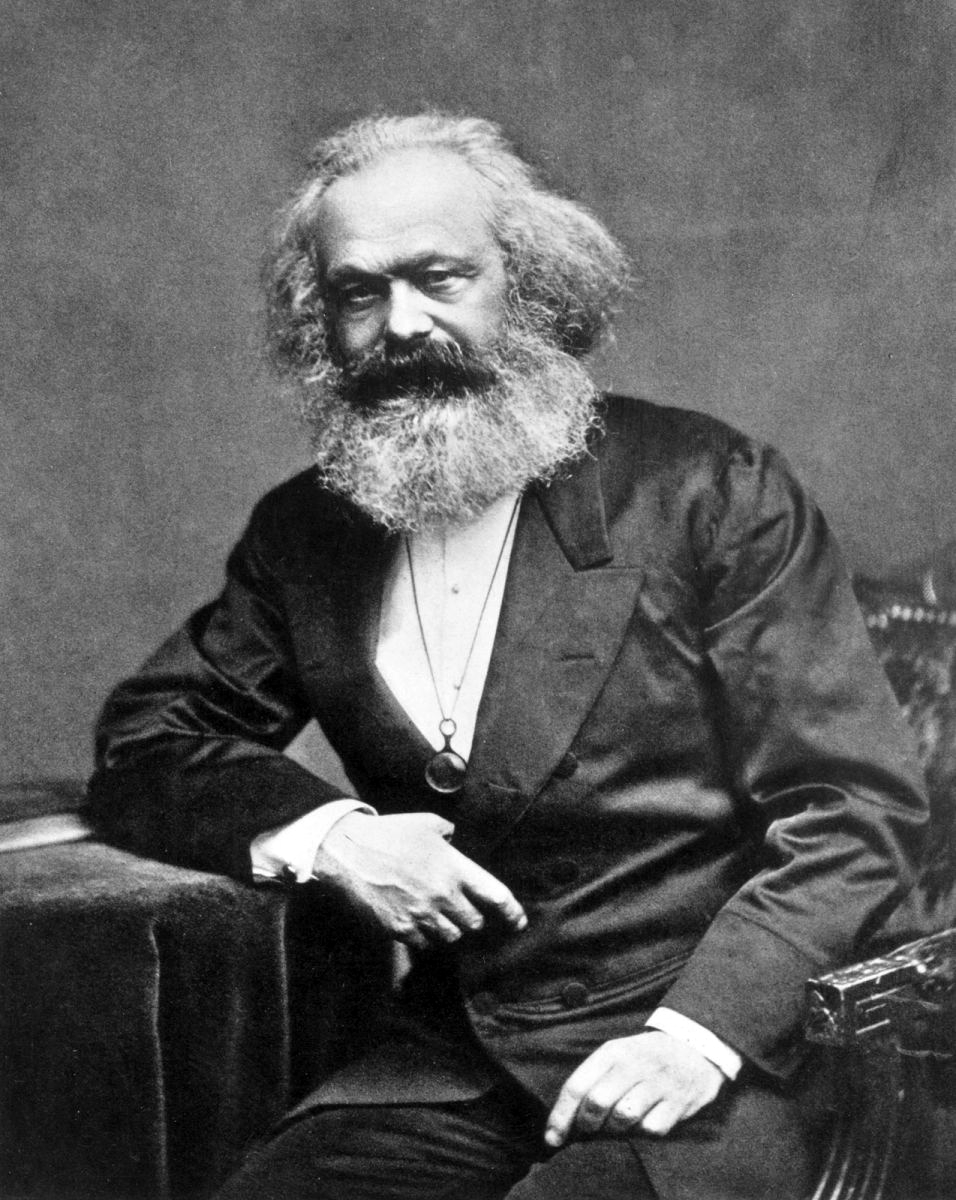
Karl Marx, author of Das Kapital

Marx is probably the most famous critic of political economy, with his three-volume magnum opus, Das Kapital. Kritik der politischen Ökonomie (Capital: A Critique of Political Economy), as one of his most famous books (Capital volume 1 appeared in 1867; the later volumes were published posthumously, by Friedrich Engels.) Marx's companion Engels engaged in critique of political economy in his 1844 Outlines of a Critique of Political Economy, which helped lay down some of the foundation for what Marx was to take further.

Marx's critique of political economy encompasses the study and exposition of the mode of production and ideology of bourgeois society, and its critique of Realabstraktionen (real abstraction), that is, the fundamental economic, i.e. social categories present within what for Marx is the capitalist mode of production, for example abstract labour. In contrast to the classics of political economy, Marx was concerned with lifting the ideological veil of surface phenomena and exposing the norms, axioms, social relations, institutions, and so on, that reproduced capital.

The central works in Marx's critique of political economy are Grundrisse, A Contribution to the Critique of Political Economy and Das Kapital. Marx's works are often explicitly named – for example: A Contribution to the Critique of Political Economy, or Capital: A Critique of Political Economy. Marx cited Engels' article Outlines of a Critique of Political Economy several times in Das Kapital. Trotskyists and other Leninists tend to implicitly or explicitly argue that these works constitute and or contain "economical theories", which can be studied independently. This was also the common understanding of Marx's work on economy that was put forward by Soviet orthodoxy. Since this is the case, it remains a matter of controversy whether Marx's critique of political economy is to be understood as a critique of the political economy or, according to the orthodox interpretation, another theory of economics. The critique of political economy is considered the most important and most central project within Marxism, which has led (and continues to lead) to numerous approaches advanced within and outside academic circles.

=== Foundational concepts ===
- Abstract labour and capital are historically specific forms of social relations, and labour is not the source of all wealth.
- Labour is the other side of the same coin as capital, labour presupposes capital, and capital presupposes labour.
- Money is not in any way something transhistorical or natural, which goes for the whole economy as well as the other categories specific to the mode of production, and its gains in value are constituted due to social relations rather than any inherent qualities.

=== Marx's critique of the methodology of economics ===
Marx described the view of contemporaneous economists and theologians on social phenomena as similarly unscientific.

Economists have a singular method of procedure. There are only two kinds of institutions for them, artificial and natural. The institutions of feudalism are artificial institutions, those of the bourgeoisie are natural institutions. In this, they resemble the theologians, who likewise establish two kinds of religion. Every religion which is not theirs is an invention of men, while their own is an emanation from God. When the economists say that present-day relations – the relations of bourgeois production – are natural, they imply that these are the relations in which wealth is created and productive forces developed in conformity with the laws of nature. These relations, therefore, are themselves natural laws independent of the influence of time. They are eternal laws that must always govern society. Thus, there has been history, but there is no longer any. There has been history, since there were the institutions of feudalism, and in these institutions of feudalism we find quite different relations of production from those of bourgeois society, which the economists try to pass off as natural and as such, eternal.

— Karl Marx, The Poverty of Philosophy

Marx continued to emphasize the ahistorical thought of the modern economists in the Grundrisse, where he among other endeavors, critiqued the liberal economist Mill. Marx also viewed the viewpoints which implicitly regarded the institutions of modernity as transhistorical as fundamentally deprived of historical understanding.

Individuals producing in society, and hence the socially determined production of individuals, is, of course, the point of departure. The solitary and isolated hunter or fisherman, who serves Adam Smith and Ricardo as a starting point, is one of the unimaginative fantasies of eighteenth-century romances a la Robinson Crusoe; and despite the assertions of social historians, these by no means signify simply a reaction against over-refinement and reversion to a misconceived natural life. No more is Rousseau's contract social, which by means of a contract establishes a relationship and connection between subjects that are by nature independent, based on this kind of naturalism. ... The individual in this society of free competition seems to be rid of natural ties, etc., which made him an appurtenance of a particular, limited aggregation of human beings in previous historical epochs. The prophets of the eighteenth century, on whose shoulders Adam Smith and Ricardo were still wholly standing, envisaged this 18th-century individual – a product of the dissolution of feudal society on the one hand and of the new productive forces evolved since the sixteenth century on the other – as an ideal whose existence belonged to the past. They saw this individual not as a historical result, but as the starting point of history; not as something evolving in the course of history, but posited by nature, because for them this individual was in conformity with nature, in keeping with their idea of human nature. This delusion has been characteristic of every new epoch hitherto.

— Karl Marx, A Contribution to the Critique of Political Economy (Introduction)

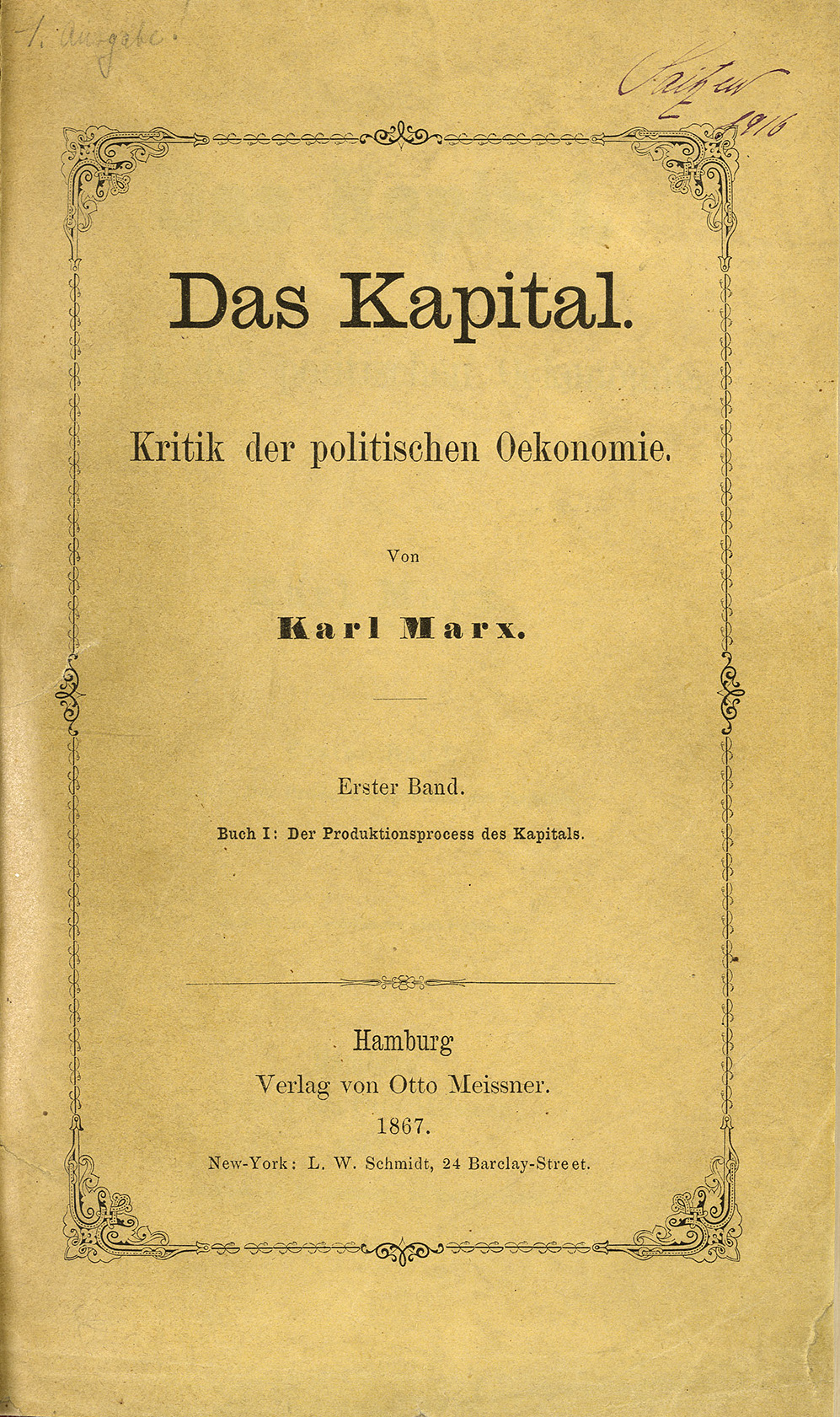
German edition of Das Kapital, a famous critique of political economy written by Marx

According to the French philosopher Jacques Rancière, what Marx understood, and what the economists failed to recognise was that the value-form is not something essential, but merely a part of the capitalist mode of production.

=== On scientifically adequate research ===
Marx offered a critique regarding the idea of people being able to conduct scientific research in this domain. He wrote:

In the domain of Political Economy, free scientific inquiry meets not merely the same enemies as in all other domains. The peculiar nature of the materials it deals with, summons as foes into the field of battle the most violent, mean, and malignant passions of the human breast, the Furies of private interest. The English Established Church, e.g., will more readily pardon an attack on 38 of its 39 articles than on 1/39 of its income. Nowadays atheism is culpa levis [a relatively slight sin, c.f. mortal sin], as compared with criticism of existing property relations.

— Karl Marx, Das Kapital (Preface to the First German Edition)

=== On vulgar economists ===
Marx criticized what he regarded as the false critique of political economy of his contemporaries, sometimes even more forcefully than when he critiqued the classical economists he described as vulgar economists. In Marx's view, the errors of some socialist authors led the workers' movement astray. He rejected Ferdinand Lassalle's iron law of wages, which he regarded as mere phraseology. He also rejected Pierre-Joseph Proudhon's attempts to do what Hegel did for religion, law, and so on for political economy, as well as regarding what is social as subjective, and what was societal as merely subjective abstractions.

=== Interpretations of Marx's critique of political economy ===
Some scholars view Marx's critique as being a critique of commodity fetishism and the manner in which this concept expresses a criticism of modernity and its modes of socialisation. Other scholars who engage with Marx's critique of political economy affirm the critique might assume a more Kantian sense, which transforms "Marx's work into a foray concerning the imminent antinomies that lie at the heart of capitalism, where politics and economy intertwine in impossible ways."

=== Contemporary Marxian ===
Regarding contemporary Marxian critiques of political economy, these are generally accompanied by a rejection of the more naturalistically influenced readings of Marx, as well as other readings later deemed weltanschaaungsmarxismus (worldview Marxism), that was popularised as late as toward the end of the 20th century.

According to some scholars in this field, contemporary critiques of political economy and contemporary German Ökonomiekritik have been at least partly neglected in the anglophone world.

== Differences between critics of economy and critics of economical issues ==
One may differentiate between those who engage in critique of political economy, which takes on a more ontological character, where authors criticise the fundamental concepts and social categories which reproduce the economy as an entity. While other authors, which the critics of political economy would consider only to deal with the surface phenomena of the economy, have a naturalized understanding of these social processes. Hence the epistemological differences between critics of economy and economists can also at times be very large.

In the eyes of the critics of political economy, the critics of economic issues merely critique certain practices in attempts to implicitly or explicitly rescue the political economy; these authors might for example propose universal basic income or to implement a planned economy.

== Others ==
=== Contemporary ===
==== Economists ====
- Richard D. Wolff
- Steve Keen
- John Komlos
- Edward S. Herman
- Yanis Varoufakis

==== Sociologists ====
- Orlando Patterson, John Cowles professor of sociology at Harvard University, argues that economics is a pseudoscience.

==== Philosophers ====
- Slavoj Žižek

==== Linguists ====
- Noam Chomsky

==== Historians ====
- Moishe Postone

=== Historical ===
==== Historians ====
- Thomas Carlyle
- Roman Rosdolsky

==== Poets ====
- Carl Jonas Love Almqvist
- August Strindberg

==== Miscellaneous ====
- Paul Lafargue

== See also ==
- Reform and opening up
- Critique of work
- Katrine Marçal
- Hans-Georg Backhaus
- Helmut Reichelt
- Humanistic economics
- Moishe Postone
- Neue Marx-Lektüre

== Bibliography ==
- Postone, Moishe (1993). Time, Labor and Social Domination: A Reinterpretation of Marx's Critical Theory. New York and Cambridge: Cambridge University Press. ISBN 9780521391573. OCLC 231578868.
- Johnsdotter S, Carlbom A, editors. Goda sanningar: debattklimatet och den kritiska forskningens villkor. Lund: Nordic Academic Press; 2010.
- Braudel F. Kapitalismens dynamik. (La Dynamique du Capitalisme) [Ny utg.]. Gothenburg: Daidalos; 2001.
- Ankarloo D, editor. Marx ekonomikritik. Stockholm: Tidskriftsföreningen Fronesis; 2008.
- Eklund K. Vår ekonomi: en introduktion till världsekonomin. Upplaga 15. Lund: Studentlitteratur; 2020.
- Tidskriftsföreningen Fronesis. Arbete. Stockholm: Tidskriftsfören. Fronesis; 2002.
- Baudrillard J. The Mirror of Production. Telos Press; 1975.
- Marx K. Till kritiken av den politiska ekonomin. [Ny utg.]. Göteborg: Proletärkultur; 1981.
