= Marxian economics =

School of economic thought

Marxian economics, or the Marxian school of economics, is a heterodox school of political economic thought. Its foundations can be traced back to Karl Marx's critique of political economy. However, unlike critics of political economy, Marxian economists tend to accept the concept of the economy prima facie. Marxian economics comprises several different theories and includes multiple schools of thought, which are sometimes opposed to each other; in many cases Marxian analysis is used to complement, or to supplement, other economic approaches. An example can be found in the works of Soviet economists like Lev Gatovsky, who sought to apply Marxist economic theory to the objectives, needs, and political conditions of the socialist construction in the Soviet Union, contributing to the development of Soviet political economy.

Marxian economics concerns itself variously with the analysis of crisis in capitalism, the role and distribution of the surplus product and surplus value in various types of economic systems, the nature and origin of economic value, the impact of class and class struggle on economic and political processes, and the process of economic evolution.

Marxian economics—particularly in academia—is distinguished from Marxism as a political ideology, as well as from the normative aspects of Marxist thought: this reflects the view that Marx's original approach to understanding economics and economic development is intellectually independent from his own advocacy of revolutionary socialism. Marxian economists do not lean entirely upon the works of Marx and other widely known Marxists, but draw from a range of Marxist and non-Marxist sources.

Considered a heterodox school, the Marxian school has been criticized by claims relating to inconsistency, failed predictions, and scrutiny of nominally communist countries' economic planning in the 20th century. According to economists such as George Stigler and Robert Solow, Marxist economics are not relevant to modern economics, having "virtually no impact" and only "represent[ing] a small minority of modern economists". However, some ideas of the Marxian school have contributed to mainstream understanding of the global economy. Certain concepts developed in Marxian economics, especially those related to capital accumulation and the business cycle, have been fitted for use in capitalist systems; one such example is Joseph Schumpeter's notion of creative destruction.

Marx's magnum opus on critique of political economy was Das Kapital (Capital: A Critique of Political Economy) in three volumes, of which only the first volume was published in his lifetime (1867); the others were published by Friedrich Engels from Marx's notes. One of Marx's early works, Critique of Political Economy, was mostly incorporated into Das Kapital, especially the beginning of volume 1. Marx's notes made in preparation for writing Das Kapital were published in 1939 under the title Grundrisse.

== Marx's critique of classical economics ==
Marx's critique of political economy took as its starting point the work of the best-known economists of his day: the British moral philosopher turned economist Adam Smith (1723-1790) as well as David Ricardo (1772-1823).

In The Wealth of Nations (1776), Smith had argued that the most important characteristic of a market economy was that it permitted a rapid growth in productive abilities. Smith claimed that a growing market stimulated a greater "division of labor" (i.e. specialization of businesses and/or workers) and in turn this led to greater productivity. Although Smith generally said little about laborers, he did note that an increased division of labor could at some point cause harm to those whose jobs became narrower and narrower as the division of labor expanded. Smith maintained that a laissez-faire economy would naturally correct itself over time.

Marx followed Smith in claiming that the most important beneficial economic consequence of capitalism was a rapid growth in productivity abilities. Marx also expanded greatly on the notion that laborers could come to harm as capitalism became more productive. Additionally, Marx noted in 1862/1863 in Theories of Surplus Value:

"We see the great advance made by Adam Smith beyond the Physiocrats in the analysis of surplus-value and hence of capital. In their view, it is only one definite kind of concrete labour—agricultural labour—that creates surplus-value... But to Adam Smith, it is general social labour — no matter in what use-values it manifests itself — the mere quantity of necessary labour, which creates value. Surplus-value, whether it takes the form of profit, rent, or the secondary form of interest, is nothing but a part of this labour, appropriated by the owners of the material conditions of labour in the exchange with living labour".

Malthus' claim in An Essay on the Principle of Population (1798) that population growth was the primary cause of subsistence-level wages for laborers provoked Marx to develop an alternative theory of wage determination. Whereas Malthus presented a historical theory of population growth, Marx offered a theory of how a relative surplus population in capitalism tended to push wages to subsistence levels. Marx saw this relative surplus population as coming from economic causes and not from biological causes (as in Malthus). This economic-based theory of surplus population is often labeled as Marx's theory of the reserve army of labour.

Ricardo developed a theory of distribution within capitalism — that is, a theory of how the output of society is distributed to classes within society. The most mature version of this theory, presented in On the Principles of Political Economy and Taxation (1817), was based on a labour theory of value in which the value of any produced object is equal to the labor embodied in the object. (Smith too presented a labor theory of value, but it was only incompletely realized.) Also notable in Ricardo's economic theory was that profit represented a deduction from society's output and that wages and profit were inversely related: an increase in profit came at the expense of a reduction in wages. Marx built much of the formal economic analysis found in Capital on Ricardo's theory of the economy.

Marx also criticized two features of "bourgeois economy" which he perceived as main factors preventing the full realization of society's productive power: ownership of the means of production, and allegedly irrational operation of the economy, which leads to "disturbances" and surplus:

When society, by taking possession of all means of production and using them on a planned basis, has freed itself and all its members from the bondage in which they are now held by these means of production which they themselves have produced but which confront them as an irresistible alien force.

— Friedrich Engels, Anti-Dühring

== Marx's critique of political economy according to Marxist economists ==
According to some, Marx employed a labour theory of value, which holds that the value of a commodity is the socially necessary labour time invested in it. In this model, capitalists do not pay workers the full value of the commodities they produce; rather, they compensate the worker for the necessary labor only (the worker's wage, which cover only the necessary means of subsistence in order to maintain him working in the present and his family in the future as a group). This necessary labor is necessarily only a fraction of a full working day – the rest, surplus-labor, would be pocketed by the capitalist as profit.

Marx theorized that the gap between the value a worker produces and his wage is a form of unpaid labour, known as surplus value. Moreover, Marx argues that markets tend to obscure the social relationships and processes of production; he called this commodity fetishism. People are highly aware of commodities, and usually don't think about the relationships and labor they represent.

Marx's analysis leads to the consideration of economic crisis. "A propensity to crisis—what we would call business cycles—was not recognised as an inherent feature of capitalism by any other economist of Marx's time," observed Robert Heilbroner in The Worldly Philosophers, "although future events have certainly indicated his prediction of successive boom and crash." Marx's theory of economic cycles was formalised by Richard Goodwin in "A Growth Cycle" (1967), a paper published during the centenary year of Capital, Volume I.

To resolve the bourgeois contradiction between the ownership of the means of production and the "social act" of production itself, Marx proposed socialization of the means of production. To remove the "disturbances" of capitalist economy, Marx postulated "rational management" of the economy, which would replace the "chaotic" market forces driven by a "sum of individual preferences":

If we conceive society as being not capitalistic but communistic the question then comes down to the need of society to calculate beforehand how much labour, means of production, and means of subsistence it can invest, without detriment, in such lines of business as for instance the building of railways, which do not furnish any means of production or subsistence, nor produce any useful effect for a long time, a year or more, where they extract labour, means of production and means of subsistence from the total annual production.

— Karl Marx, Capital, Lawrence & Wishart, London, 1957, pp. 314–315

=== Methodology ===
Marx used dialectics, a method that he adapted from the works of Georg Wilhelm Friedrich Hegel. Dialectics focuses on relation and change, and tries to avoid seeing the universe as composed of separate objects, each with essentially stable unchanging characteristics. One component of dialectics is abstraction; out of an undifferentiated mass of data or system conceived of as an organic whole, one abstracts portions to think about or to refer to. One may abstract objects, but also—and more typically—relations, and processes of change. An abstraction may be extensive or narrow, may focus on generalities or specifics, and may be made from various points of view. For example, a sale may be abstracted from a buyer's or a seller's point of view, and one may abstract a particular sale or sales in general. Another component is the dialectical deduction of categories. Marx uses Hegel's notion of categories, which are forms, for economics: The commodity form, the money form, the capital form etc. have to be systematically deduced instead of being grasped in an outward way as done by the bourgeois economists. This corresponds to Hegel's critique of Kant's transcendental philosophy.

Marx regarded history as having passed through several stages. The details of his periodisation vary somewhat through his works, but it essentially is: Primitive Communism – Slave societies – Feudalism – Capitalism – Socialism – Communism (capitalism being the present stage and communism the future). Marx occupied himself primarily with describing capitalism. Historians place the beginning of capitalism some time between about 1450 (Sombart) and some time in the 17th century (Hobsbawm).

Marx defines a commodity as a product of human labour that is produced for sale in a market, and many products of human labour are commodities. Marx began his major work on economics, Capital, with a discussion of commodities; Chapter One is called "Commodities".

=== Commodities ===
"The wealth of those societies in which the capitalist mode of production prevails, presents itself as 'an immense accumulation of commodities,' its unit being a single commodity." (First sentence of Capital, Volume I.)

"The common substance that manifests itself in the exchange value of commodities whenever they are exchanged, is their value." (Capital, I, Chap I, section 1.)

The worth of a commodity can be conceived of in two different ways, which Marx calls use-value and value. A commodity's use-value is its usefulness for fulfilling some practical purpose; for example, the use-value of a piece of food is that it provides nourishment and pleasurable taste; the use value of a hammer, that it can drive nails.

Value is, on the other hand, a measure of a commodity's worth in comparison to other commodities. It is closely related to exchange-value, the ratio at which commodities should be traded for one another, but not identical: value is at a more general level of abstraction; exchange-value is a realisation or form of it.

Marx argued that if value is a property common to all commodities, then whatever it is derived from, whatever determines it, must be common to all commodities. The only relevant thing that is, in Marx's view, common to all commodities is human labour: they are all produced by human labour.

Marx concluded that the value of a commodity is simply the amount of human labour required to produce it. Thus Marx adopted a labour theory of value, as had his predecessors Ricardo and MacCulloch; Marx himself traced the existence of the theory at least as far back as an anonymous work, Some Thoughts on the Interest of Money in General, and Particularly the Publick Funds, &c., published in London around 1739 or 1740.

Marx placed some restrictions on the validity of his value theory: he said that in order for it to hold, the commodity must not be a useless item; and it is not the actual amount of labour that went into producing a particular individual commodity that determines its value, but the amount of labour that a worker of average energy and ability, working with average intensity, using the prevailing techniques of the day, would need to produce it. A formal statement of the law is: the value of a commodity is equal to the average socially necessary labour time required for its production. (Capital, I, Chap I – p. 39 in Progress Publishers, Moscow, ed'n.)

Marx's contention was that commodities tend, at a fairly general level of abstraction, to exchange at value; that is, if Commodity A, whose value is "V", is traded for Commodity B, it will tend to fetch an amount of Commodity B whose value is the same, "V". Particular circumstances will cause divergence from this rule, however.

=== Money ===
Marx held that metallic money, such as gold, is a commodity, and its value is the labour time necessary to produce it (mine it, smelt it, etc.). Marx argued that gold and silver are conventionally used as money because they embody a large amount of labour in a small, durable, form, which is convenient. Paper money is, in this model, a representation of gold or silver, almost without value of its own but held in circulation by state decree.

"Paper money is a token representing gold or money." (Capital, I, Chap III, section 2, part c.)

=== Production ===
Marx lists the elementary factors of production as:

1. Labour, "the personal activity of man." (Capital, I, VII, 1.)
2. The subject of labour: the thing worked on.
3. The instruments of labour: tools, labouring domestic animals like horses, chemicals used in modifying the subject, etc.

Some subjects of labour are available directly from Nature: uncaught fish, unmined coal, etc. Others are results of a previous stage of production; these are known as raw materials, such as flour or yarn. Workshops, canals, and roads are considered instruments of labour. (Capital, I, VII, 1.) Coal for boilers, oil for wheels, and hay for draft horses are considered raw materials, not instruments of labour.

"If, on the other hand, the subject of labour has, so to say, been filtered through previous labour, we call it raw material. . . ." (Capital, I, Chap VII, section 1.)

The subjects of labour and instruments of labour together are called the means of production. Relations of production are the relations human beings adopt toward each other as part of the production process. In capitalism, wage labour and private property are part of the system of relations of production.

Calculation of value of a product (price not to be confused with value):
If labour is performed directly on Nature and with instruments of negligible value, the value of the product is simply the labour time. If labour is performed on something that is itself the product of previous labour (that is, on a raw material), using instruments that have some value, the value of the product is the value of the raw material, plus depreciation on the instruments, plus the labour time. Depreciation may be figured simply by dividing the value of the instruments by their working life; e.g. if a lathe worth £1,000 lasts in use 10 years it imparts value to the product at a rate of £100 per year.

$value = mp + lt$,	Where:	$value$	is the value of the product;
		$mp$	is the value of the means of production;
		$lt$	is the labour time.

=== Labor theory of value ===
The labour theory of value was initially introduced by the classical economists Adam Smith and David Ricardo, but was further developed in Marx's work Capital. According to the labour theory of value, the value of a commodity equals the socially necessary labour time required to produce it.

The value of commodities is divided into two categories: use-value and exchange-value. Use-value is the usefulness of a commodity. Exchange-value is the proportion by which use-values of one kind are exchanged for use-values of other kinds. However, since the exchange-values are not arbitrary, there must be a common unit by which the goods can be equated. When the unique use-values of the goods are removed, the only value left is the labour time necessary to produce the commodity.

=== Abstract labor ===
Marx's theory of value differs from the classical view in his definition of labor. Marx separates it into two different types: concrete and abstract labor. Concrete labor can be thought of as the unique characteristics of labor such as the work of a farmer versus a tailor. Abstract labor, on the other hand, is the general conceptualization of human labor. It represents the expenditure of simple human labor power. Concrete labor produces qualitatively different commodities; however, in order to equalize and compare the values of qualitatively different commodities quantitatively, their value must be measured in terms of abstract labor. Abstract labor is the basic unit of value and is basis for Marx's labor theory of value.

=== Surplus value ===
According to Marx, in capitalism, workers own their labor-power, but do not own the means of production through which they can actualize their labor power and generate use-values. As a result, the workers must sell their labor and are alienated from it. The capitalist takes the use-values created by the workers. However, the capitalist does not want these goods for their use-values, rather, he or she wants them for their exchange-values. According to Marx, capitalists desire profit or surplus-value. However, no surplus value can be created naturally. The labor process simply transforms value from one form into another. Thus, according to Marx, the only way for the capitalist to gain surplus-value is by paying the workers' exchange-value, not their use-value. The difference between these two values is the surplus-value generated.

=== Effect of technical progress ===
According to Marx, the amount of actual product (i.e. use-value) that a typical worker produces in a given amount of time is the productivity of labour. It has tended to increase under capitalism. This is due to increase in the scale of enterprise, to specialisation of labour, and to the introduction of machinery. The immediate result of this is that the value of a given item tends to decrease, because the labour time necessary to produce it becomes less.

In a given amount of time, labour produces more items, but each unit has less value; the total value created per time remains the same. This means that the means of subsistence become cheaper; therefore the value of labour power or necessary labour time becomes less. If the length of the working day remains the same, this results in an increase in the surplus labour time and the rate of surplus value.

Technological advancement tends to increase the amount of capital needed to start a business, and it tends to result in an increasing preponderance of capital being spent on means of production (constant capital) as opposed to labour (variable capital). Marx called the ratio of these two kinds of capital the composition of capital.

== Current theorizing in Marxian economics ==
Marxian economics has been built upon by many others, beginning almost at the moment of Marx's death. The second and third volumes of Das Kapital were edited by his close associate Friedrich Engels, based on Marx's notes. Marx's Theories of Surplus Value was edited by Karl Kautsky. The Marxian value theory and the Perron–Frobenius theorem on the positive eigenvector of a positive matrix are fundamental to mathematical treatments of Marxian economics. The relation between exploitation (surplus labour) and profit has been modeled with increased sophistication.

The Universities offering one or more courses in Marxian economics, or teach one or more economics courses on other topics from a perspective that they designate as Marxian or Marxist, include Colorado State University, The New School for Social Research, School of Oriental and African Studies, Federal University of Rio de Janeiro, State University of Campinas, Maastricht University, University of Bremen, University of California, Riverside, University of Leeds, University of Maine, University of Manchester, University of Massachusetts Amherst, University of Massachusetts Boston, University of Missouri–Kansas City, University of Sheffield, University of Utah, University of Calcutta, and York University (Toronto).

English-language journals include Capital & Class, Historical Materialism, Monthly Review, Rethinking Marxism, Review of Radical Political Economics, and Studies in Political Economy.

== Criticism ==
Much of the critique of classical Marxian economics came from Marxian economists that revised Marx's original theory, or by the Austrian School of economics. V. K. Dmitriev, writing in 1898, Ladislaus von Bortkiewicz, writing in 1906–07, and subsequent critics claimed that Marx's labor theory of value and law of the tendency of the rate of profit to fall are internally inconsistent. In other words, the critics allege that Marx drew conclusions that actually do not follow from his theoretical premises. Once these alleged errors are corrected, his conclusion that aggregate price and profit are determined by, and equal to, aggregate value and surplus value no longer holds true. This result calls into question his theory that the exploitation of workers is the sole source of profit.

Whether the rate of profit in capitalism has, as Marx predicted, tended to fall is a subject of debate. N. Okishio, in 1961, devised a theorem (Okishio's theorem) showing that if capitalists pursue cost-cutting techniques and if the real wage does not rise, the rate of profit must rise.

The inconsistency allegations have been a prominent feature of Marxian economics and the debate surrounding it since the 1970s.

The economies of Marxist states in the 20th century have been criticized for exhibiting overcentralization and shortage of goods and the prevalence of second economies (black markets) for very basic goods, leading János Kornai and colleagues to theorize these systems as chronic shortage economies. While Kornai attributes some specific problems to efforts at consistency with Marxian methodological principles, and others have proposed economic planning schemes that do directly employ Marxian concepts such as labor content, the theory of shortage economy refers to measurable performance in planned economies that employed a variety of models and techniques such as product balances, linear programming and input-output planning and not to Marxian economic theory. Dembinski argued Marx's determination of "labor value", a central concept in the labor theory of value, was inconsistent, and if accurately assessed in these economies helps explain their decline.

== Relevance in economics ==
According to economists such as George Stigler and Robert Solow in 1988, Marxist economics are not relevant to English-speaking economics, having "virtually no impact", only "represent a small minority of modern economists" and are "an irrelevant dead end."

Professor Jonathon Sperber says some elements, such as base and superstructure, exploitation of workers within the free market, and crises of capitalism (such as boom and bust cycles), remain salient today, albeit with contemporary updates, while others he sees as less relevant, such as the labor theory of value and the tendency of the rate of profit to fall.

== Neo-Marxian economics ==
The terms "neo-Marxian", "post-Marxian", and "radical political economics" were first used to refer to a distinct tradition of economic theory in the 1970s and 1980s that stems from Marxian economic thought. Many of the leading figures were associated with the leftist Monthly Review School. The neo-Marxist approach to development economics is connected with dependency and world systems theories. In these cases, the 'exploitation' that classifies it as Marxist is an external one, rather than the normal 'internal' exploitation of classical Marxism.

In industrial economics, the neo-Marxian approach stresses the monopolistic and oligarchical rather than the competitive nature of capitalism. This approach is associated with Michał Kalecki, Josef Steindl, Paul A. Baran and Paul Sweezy.

Such theorists as Marc Fleurbaey, Samuel Bowles, David Gordon, John Roemer, Herbert Gintis, Jon Elster, and Adam Przeworski have adopted the techniques of neoclassical economics, including game theory and mathematical modeling, to demonstrate Marxian concepts such as exploitation and class conflict. In particular, Analytical Marxism was one of these representative tendencies.

The neo-Marxian approach integrated non-Marxist or "bourgeois" economics from the post-Keynesians like Joan Robinson and the neo-Ricardian school of Piero Sraffa. Polish economists Michał Kalecki, Rosa Luxemburg, Henryk Grossman, Adam Przeworski, and Oskar Lange were influential in this school, particularly in developing theories of underconsumption. While most official communist parties denounced neo-Marxian theories as "bourgeois economics," some neo-Marxians served as advisers to socialist or Third World developing governments. Neo-marxist theories were also influential in the study of Imperialism.

Among the critics pointing out internal inconsistencies are former and current Marxian and/or Sraffian economists, such as Paul Sweezy, Nobuo Okishio, Ian Steedman, John Roemer, Gary Mongiovi, and David Laibman, who propose that the field be grounded in their correct versions of Marxian economics instead of in Marx's critique of political economy in the original form in which he presented and developed it in Capital.

Proponents of the temporal single-system interpretation (TSSI) of Marx's value theory claim that the supposed inconsistencies are actually the result of misinterpretation; they argue that when Marx's theory is understood as "temporal" and "single-system," the alleged internal inconsistencies disappear. In a recent survey of the debate, a proponent of the TSSI concludes that "the proofs of inconsistency are no longer defended; the entire case against Marx has been reduced to the interpretive issue."

Despite being an orthodox Marxist economist, Maurice Dobb was also associated with this current.

=== Concepts ===
Big business can maintain selling prices at high levels while still competing to cut costs, advertise and market their products. However, competition is generally limited with a few large capital formations sharing various markets, with the exception of a few actual monopolies (such as the Bell System at the time). The economic surpluses that result cannot be absorbed through consumers spending more. The concentration of the surplus in the hands of the business elite must therefore be geared towards imperialistic and militaristic government tendencies, which is the easiest and surest way to utilise surplus productive capacity.

Exploitation focuses on low wage workers and groups at home, especially minorities. Average earners see the pressures in drive for production destroy their human relationships, leading to wider alienation and hostility. The whole system is largely irrational since though individuals may make rational decisions, the ultimate systemic goals are not. The system continues to function so long as Keynesian full employment policies are pursued, but there is the continued threat to stability from less-developed countries throwing off the restraints of neo-colonial domination.

==== Labor theory of value ====
Paul A. Baran introduced the concept of potential economic surplus to deal with novel complexities raised by the dominance of monopoly capital, in particular the theoretical prediction that monopoly capitalism would be associated with low capacity utilization, and hence potential surplus would typically be much larger than the realized surplus. With Paul Sweezy, Baran elaborated the importance of this innovation, its consistency with Marx's labor concept of value and supplementary relation to Marx's category of surplus value.

According to Baran's categories:

- Actual economic surplus: "the difference between what society's actual current output and its actual current consumption." Hence, it is equal to current savings or accumulation.
- Potential economic surplus: "the difference between that output that could be produced in a given natural and technical environment with the help of employable productive resources, and what might be regarded as essential consumption."

Baran also introduced the concept of planned surplus—a category that could only be operationalized in a rationally planned socialist society. This was defined as "the difference between society's 'optimum' output available in a historically given natural and technological environment under conditions of planned 'optimal' utilization of all available productive resources, and some chosen 'optimal' volume of consumption."

Baran used the surplus concept to analyze underdeveloped economies (or what are now more optimistically called "developing economies") in his Political Economy of Growth.

== See also ==
- List of Marxian economists
- Capitalist mode of production
- Capital accumulation
- Evolutionary economics
- Surplus labour
- Labour power
- Law of value
- Unequal exchange
- Value product
- Productive and unproductive labour
- Regulation school
- Socialist economics
- The Accumulation of Capital
- Material product
- Critique of political economy
