= Marxology =

Aspect of Marxism

Marxology is a systematic scholarly approach to the understanding of Karl Marx and Friedrich Engels and Marxism. The term was first used by David Ryazanov, librarian of the Marx-Engels Institute in Moscow, around 1920 as he set out to publish the complete works of Marx and Engels. During the Second World War, Maximilien Rubel introduced the term into France. He was astonished by the "lack of any sustained understanding of the life and works of Marx by self-proclaimed Marxists" active in the French resistance during the occupation of Paris.

== Marxology in the Soviet Union ==
A number of official publications in the Soviet Union praised Ryazanov as a Marxologist in 1930. He was:

- "the most eminent Marxologist of our time", Izvestia, 10 March 1930
- "the most renowned and the most important of the Marxist scholars of our time" (Inprecor, no.26, 19 March 1930)
- "under Riazonov’s direct scientific and administrative leadership, [the Marx-Engels Institute] accomplished impressive work …with his considerable scientific and investigative activity in the sphere of marxology", Pravda

However, during investigations in preparation for the 1931 Menshevik Trial, Ryazanov was implicated under duress by his colleague Isaak Illich Rubin and expelled from the Communist Party.

== Notable Marxologists ==
In 1982 the following were listed in Review: Tendencies in Marxology and Tendencies in History (1982):

- Michel Henry: Marx: A Philosophy of Human Reality ([1976], English translation 1983)
- G. A. Cohen: Karl Marx's Theory of History (1978)
- John McMurtry: The Structure of Marx's World-View (1978)
- Melvin Rader: Marx's Interpretation of History (1979)

Other important works of Marxology include:

- Roman Rosdolsky: The Making of Marx's Capital (1977)
- Maximilien Rubel: Marx, Life and Works (1980)
- Robert Kurz: Read Marx: The most important texts of Karl Marx for the 21st Century (2000)
- Michael Heinrich: An Introduction to the Three Volumes of Karl Marx's Capital (2012) and Karl Marx and the Birth of Modern Society: The Life of Marx and the Development of His Work. Volume I: 1818-1841 (2019)
