= Minus six =

Minus six, −6, or –6 may refer to:

- Minus Six, an American pop rock group
- Minus six (exile), a Soviet punishment
- Dash 6, a de Havilland Canada aircraft

== See also ==
- 6 (number)
- Six (disambiguation)
