= Alexander Helfgot =

Russian politician

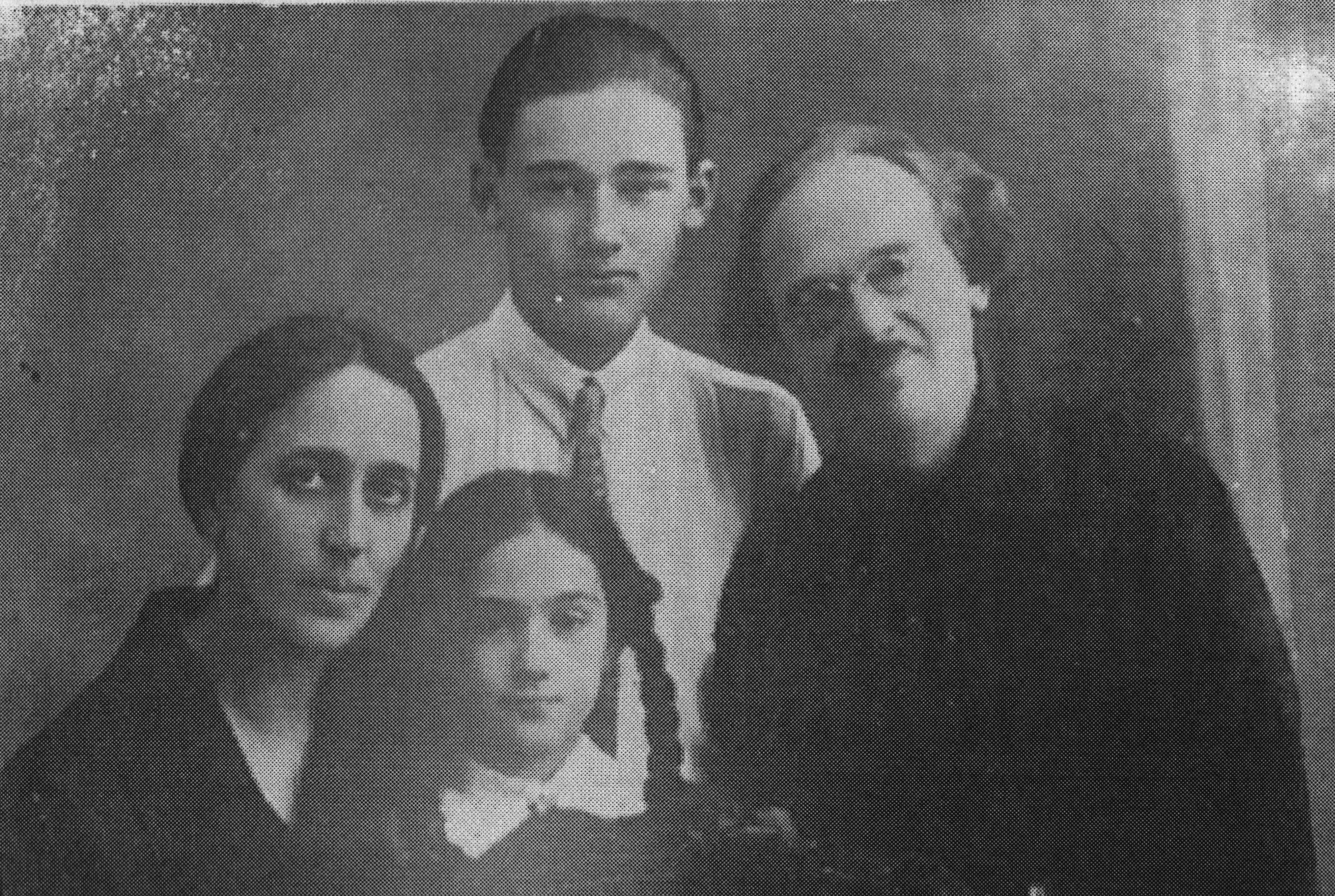
Alexander Helfgot, his wife Elena Tumpovskaya and their children Mikhail and Natasha

Alexander Pavlovich Helfgot (Russian: Александр Павлович Гельфгот, 1887 – 25 April 1938) was a Russian Socialist-Revolutionary politician and economist. He was a prominent Socialist-Revolutionary figure from 1917 to 1922. Arrested in 1922, he spent 17 years in prisons or internal exile before being executed in 1938.

== Early life ==
Alexander Helfgot was born in 1887. His father was Pavel Grigorevich Helfgot, born around 1861 in a Jewish family from Tiflis, who had been arrested in 1885 by the Warsaw Governorate Gendarmerie in connection with the Second Proletariat case. Alexander Helfgot grew up in Rostov-on-Don. He joined the Party of Socialist-Revolutionaries in 1904.

== Political career ==
In 1915-1916, he was a member of the Executive Committee of the All-Russian Labour Bureau, which was set up under the section for placement of refugees of the All-Russian Union of Cities.

As of 1917, he was one of the editors of the newspaper Trud ('Labour'), the organ of the Moscow Committee of the Party of Socialist-Revolutionaries. He was elected to the Moscow City Duma in 1917. As of 1919, he was a member of the Yekaterinodar Governorate Committee of the Party of Socialist-Revolutionaries. In 1920, he was inducted into the Central Bureau of the Party of Socialist-Revolutionaries. The Central Bureau was a party leadership body formed after the entire Central Committee had been arrested, albeit the Central Bureau members were soon also arrested.

== Arrest ==
On 23 March, 1921, Helfgot was arrested on Nikolsky Lane in Moscow. He was detained at Butyrka prison. Whilst in prison, Helfgot wrote an essay about the Cheka titled Korabl smerti ('Ship of Death'). The text was smuggled out of Russia and published by the exiled Central Committee of the Party of Socialist-Revolutionaries in Berlin in 1922.

On 24 February 1922, the Presidium of the GPU included him in the list of Socialist-Revolutionaries who, in connection with the Trial of the Socialist Revolutionaries, were charged with anti-Soviet activities. He was a witness for the defense at the trial. On 18 December 1922, an NKVD commission sentenced him to three years imprisonment for anti-Soviet actions and he was sent to a prison camp in Arkhangelsk.

== Years in internal exile ==
As of 1930, he was serving his "minus six" period of exile in Kokand. He was arrested and charged with organization of Socialist-Revolutionary activities and foreign connections. On 3 January 1931, the Special Department of the OGPU Collegium decreed that he be exiled to Ust-Sysolsk. In 1933, his site of exile was shifted to Vologda. In February of that year, a two-year extension of his exile was issued.

== Great Terror ==
Helfgot was arrested by the NKVD in Vologda on 8 February 1937. The indictment was signed off by Major Sergei Zhupakhin, Head of the NKVD Department in Vologda. Helfgot was accused of having tried to reorganize the Socialist-Revolutionary movement after arriving in Vologda. The NKVD investigation lasted for over one year. Helfgot was sentenced and executed on 25 April 1938.
