= A History of Economic Thought =

A history of economic thought (Istoriya ekonomicheskoi mysli) is a book by the Russian economist Isaak Illich Rubin (1886–1937). A second revised edition published in Russian in 1929 was first translated into English by Donald Filtzer and published in 1979. The book covers the period from mercantilism in the 16th century to the decline of the classical school of political economy with writers like John Stuart Mill in the mid-19th century. It critically appraises the theories of major writers, and places their thought in the context of the economic and social changes of their day. It adopts a Marxist standpoint in making critiques, but Marx's work is not itself discussed at any length. The book ends with the state of economics as Marx found it when he first turned to it in the mid-19th century. Rubin's other major work, Essays on Marx's theory of value, takes up Marx's own contributions.

The book is structured into five main parts, each divided into several chapters, and a sixth part which is an overview of the theoretical developments covered in the book.

== Part One: Mercantilism and its decline ==
Part one begins with the economic context of the later Middle Ages in Western Europe, including the institutions of the feudal demesne, the guilds and master craftsmen; expanding trade among West European countries, and the importance of colonial trade. With these came changes in the fortunes of different classes, such as the rise of a commercial bourgeoisie and a relative decline of the peasantry and craftsmen. The political context is set in terms of the rise of mercantilist policy in England in the 16th and 17th centuries. The writers discussed include Thomas Gresham, Thomas Mun, Dudley North, William Petty and David Hume. Early developments of the theory of value (Petty) and the theory of money (Hume) are flagged, to be taken up in later parts of the book by the likes of Adam Smith and David Ricardo.

== Part Two: The Physiocrats ==
The historical context is set with a discussion of mid-18th century France and the situation of large scale and small scale agriculture there at the time. Early development of a theory of social classes, as is Quesnay's theory of an economic whole in terms of the Tableau Economique.

== Part Three: Adam Smith ==
The historical context is set with a discussion of industrial capitalism in England in the mid-18th century. An intellectual biography of Adam Smith places him in the context of the Scottish Enlightenment as both an economist and a philosopher, well acquainted with the French Physiocratic school. His social philosophy is described, emphasizing the connection to a doctrine of natural right, and immutable human nature. His economic theories are explained in terms of four organizing categories: the division of labour; the theory of value; the theory of distribution; and the theory of capital and productive labour.

== Part Four: David Ricardo ==
The historical context takes up the industrial revolution in England as it progressed between Smith's time and Ricardo's. A chapter on Ricardo's biography is followed by one on his philosophical and methodological bases. His theory of value is laid out in terms of labour value; capital and surplus value; and prices of production. The discussion is rounded out with chapters on his theory of ground rent and of wages and profits.

Part Five: the decline of the Classical school

Rubin traces the start of the decline from the work of Thomas Malthus, and Jean-Baptiste Say. The confusion of the Ricardian theory of value and the theory of wages is discussed through Robert Torrens, Samuel Bailey, James Mill, and John Ramsay McCulloch. Rubin argues that economics turned from a science increasingly into an apologetics with theorists such as Henry Carey and Frederic Bastiat who banished the observed disharmony and antagonism of the economy from their study and replaced it with a stipulated harmony of interests, and Nassau Senior's theory of abstinence which detached the theory of profits from the theory of value. Simonde de Sismondi's theory of capitalist crises and criticism of JB Say are presented as important advances running contrary to the period of decline, but Rubin balances this by noting the reactionary character of Sismondi's work in that he argued limiting the volume of industrial development and pined for the small-peasant economy. Piercy Ravenstone, Thomas Hodgskin, and Robert Owen, part of the utopian socialist tradition, are characterized as replacing Ricardo's theoretical law of the labour theory of value with a moral postulate of the labourer's right to the product of her labour. John Stuart Mill is presented as the twilight of the classical school, proclaiming himself as an advocate of the school, but having abandoned or distorted all its core theories.
