= Special Council on Food Supply =

The Special Council on Food Supply was a governmental agency established by the Imperial Russian Government in 1915 during the First World War to ensure adequate supplies of food.

The council had representatives from various organisations. Vladimir Groman represented the Union of Cities.

Problems with food supply in the Russian Empire did not so much arise from a fall in production, which undoubtedly there was, but rather as regards how grain was transported to the cities. Output had fallen by 10 million tons by 1916, but this had been offset by the cessation of a similar amount of grain being exported. The problem was rather that the railways were subject to military priorities, which meant that food did not consistently reach the cities. Likewise coal production had actually increased, but was disproportionately absorbed by the expanding war industries, so that frequently the trains were not able to run effectively. Likewise the production of rolling stock took second place to the production of arms, giving rise to another set of problems.

This was an area which the Special Council on Food Supply monitored, for example concluding that Petrograd needed 12,150 wagon-loads of food a month.

In 1916 the Russian economy was faced with an earlier version of the Scissor crisis of 1923: there was a widening gap ("price scissors") between industrial and agricultural prices. For example the price of Rye rose by 47% whereas that of a pair of boots rose by 334%. Peasants decided to feed their surplus grain to their cows or distill Vodka. In the reviling climate of inflation one peasant remarked: "the richness caused by the money is like the money itself: it is of paper, and has no weight, and good only to be counted. It goes like water, and leaves no trace". Aleksandr Aleksandrovich Rittikh was responsible for the introduction of grain requisitions in late 1916, before the Bolsheviks came to power, albeit in a less than efficient fashion.

== State Food Committee ==
Following the February Revolution of 1917, it was renamed the State Food Committee.

== See also ==
- State Council Party and State Organizations Special Food Supply Center, China, established 2004
