= Aleksandr Finn-Enotaevsky =

Soviet economist

Aleksandr Yule'vich Finn-Enotaevsky (1872, Kaunas – 1943) was a Soviet economist. His most famous work is The Modern Economy of Russia (1890-1910).

Finn-Enotaevsky was an active Bolshevik until 1915, when he decided to focus his attention on his career as an academic economist, becoming a professor in the subject. He was on friendly terms with Vladimir Groman and Nikolai Kondratiev.

He was one of the defendants at the 1931 Menshevik Trial. He received a sentence for ten years. He died in Karagandy Province and was rehabilitated in 1991.

== Early years ==
Alexander Yulievich Finn-Enotaevsky was born in Kovno on November 10 (22), 1872 to a Jewish family. His father, Joel Girshevich Finn, was a bank clerk; his mother Rayna-Bryan Girshevna Finn (nee Edelman) was a housewife. His name at birth was Abe Ioelevich Finn; years later, after being exiled to Enotaevsk, he began to use the pseudonym Enotaevsky, which later became part of his surname.

He studied at the gymnasium in Nikolaev, then entered the Faculty of Physics and Mathematics of the Imperial University of St. Vladimir in Kyiv, where he specialized in chemistry. During his studies, he became interested in Marxism, then joined the Russian Social Democratic Labor Party in 1892. In 1895, after graduating from the university, he did not stay in it (according to his own recollections, due to the fact that he "was carried away by the social sciences"). In 1895 he entered the medical faculty of Moscow University.

While a student of the medical faculty of Moscow University, he became active again in the social democratic movement, creating and heading one of the first Marxist circles in Moscow and conducting social-democratic propaganda among students. In 1895, he became one of the organizers of the Moscow Workers' Union, which united the disparate Moscow Social Democratic circles into a semblance of a single organization.

In 1896, he was arrested in the case of the Moscow Workers' Union and sentenced to two years of exile in the city of Enotaevsk (now the village of Enotaevka, Astrakhan Oblast).

== In exile ==
Due to police persecution, he was forced to emigrate to Switzerland, where he continued to engage in social-democratic work. In 1903, as a Member of the 2nd Congress of the Russian Social Democratic Labour Party, he joined the Bolsheviks, working closely with Vladimir Lenin abroad and in Russia.

== Return to Russia ==
He participated in the revolution of 1905, in Moscow and St. Petersburg. Thereafter he collaborated in the Bolshevik publications "Herald of Life" in 1907 and the journal "Enlightenment" in 1912.

With the outbreak of the First World War, he moved to the position of defending the fatherland, for which he was branded by Lenin as a defencist and chauvinist. He wrote a number of works on economic issues, in which, according to Lenin, he distorted the essence of Marxism.

== After 1917 ==
After the October Revolution, he contributed to the Social Democrat-Internationalist newspaper Novaya Zhizn.

In 1931 he was convicted in the case of the counter-revolutionary sabotage organization of the Mensheviks - the fictitious "Union Bureau of the Mensheviks." On March 9, 1931 he was sentenced to 10 years in prison. After the verdict, Finn-Enotaevsky told M. Yakubovich, who had been convicted with him in the same trial: “I will not live to see the time when it will be possible to tell the truth about our trial. You are the youngest of all, you have more chances than everyone else to live to this time. I command you to tell the truth."

In 1931, after his arrest, Against Militant Menshevism (Finn-Enotayevshchina), a collection of articles by well-known Marxist economists at that time, was published. V. M. Serebryakov wrote in the preface to the collection that all the scientific constructions of Finn-Enotaevsky are permeated with the desire to “show the viability of capitalism and the impossibility of socialist construction in the USSR.” M. I. Bortnik called the work of Finn-Enotaevsky "social fascism in the field of theory." M. Eskin wrote that “in the person of Finn-Enotaevsky we have an inveterate Menshevik who turns back at the mere thought of the dictatorship of the proletariat”

In 1940 he was arrested again and sentenced on July 1, 1941 to eight years in camps for "anti-Soviet agitation." According to a certificate from the KGB of the USSR dated April 1991, Finn-Enotaevsky died in Karlag (Karaganda region) on February 7, 1943. He was rehabilitated on March 13, 1991 by the USSR Prosecutor's Office.

== Publications ==
- The current economy of Russia (1890 - 1910 years) St Petersburg: Semenova, (1911)
- Present Situation of the World Economy, (1920)
- Новые идеи в экономике (New ideas in economics), (1925)
- Finansovy kapital i proizvoditelny, (1926)
