= Vladimir Groman =

Menshevik economist

- Born: 21 February 1874
- Died: 11 March 1940 (aged 66); Verkhneuralsk, RSFSR, USSR
- Scientific career
- Fields: statistics, economics

Vladimir Gustavovich Groman (Russian: Влади́мир Густа́вович Гро́ман; 21 February 1874 – 11 March 1940) was a Menshevik economist and statistician active in Gosplan, the Soviet Union's central economic planning agency and the Central Statistical Directorate.

Beginning in 1925 and for the rest of the 1920s, Groman produced annual control figures detailing the production of the Soviet economy, developing statistical techniques that would serve as a foundation for the five-year plans of the Soviet economy. Groman was analytical and an economic realist — tendencies which put him at odds with the rampant voluntarism of extreme elements in the Soviet planning bureaucracy, culminating in his arrest on specious charges of coordinated wrecking in 1930.

In 1931, despite his having been long separated from the Menshevik political organization, Groman was made the chief defendant in the 1931 Menshevik Trial, a prominent show trial at which he dutifully confessed to conspiratorial economic crimes against the Soviet state. He was sentence to a ten year term of confinement, dying while still in custody at the Verkhneuralsk Politisolator in 1940.

== Biography ==
=== Early life ===
Vladimir Groman was born February 21, 1874, the son of a German father, a German language teacher, and a Russian mother. He attended Moscow University, where he was arrested for radical political activity in 1897, resulting to a term of administrative exile in Orlov, Viatka guberniia, located in European Russia. While in exile there, Groman developed his own methodology, which he called "typology," of analyzing the data of the Viatka guberniia zemstvo.

A Marxist, Groman joined the Russian Social Democratic Labour Party (RSDLP) in 1898 and affiliated with that organizations Menshevik faction after the split that took place in the aftermath of the 2nd Congress in 1903.

Following conclusion of his term of administrative exile in 1901, Groman moved to Simferopol in Crimea, where he found work as assistant chief of the Simferopol statistical bureau. He soon ran afoul of the Okhrana (Tsarist secret police), however, resulting in a second arrest. After 18 months in jail, Groman was this time deported for a term of administrative exile, this time to the city of Ekaterinoslav in Ukraine, where he worked on a newspaper.

Continued political activity resulted in a third arrest in 1902, which was followed by yet another term of exile, this time to Eastern Siberia. He would remain there until winning his release in February 1905, after the eruption of the Russian Revolution of 1905 the previous month.

After a short stint in Tver, Groman returned to Moscow, where he published several statistical works under the pseudonym of "Vladimir Gorn." He received a degree from Moscow University in 1908, despite not having attended lectures there, and was employed the following year as head of the statistical bureau of the Penza guberniia zemstvo. While in this position he further refined his statistical methodology, developing the mechanism of monitoring economic development of broad sectors of the economy through representative sampling.

=== First World War ===
With Russia's entry into World War I in the summer of 1914 came a trend towards inflation. Groman was particularly concerned with rising food prices and their impact on the working class. He came to Moscow and became involved in a special "Committee to Study the Current High Prices" established by the Chuprov Society. Groman was closely involved raising funds to support the society's work and was instrumental making the publication of three volumes on price trends during the first year of the war. Groman's work in this year determining planted acreages and estimating crop yields was regarded as particularly important.

In 1915, tsarist authorities were concerned about disorganization of the economy due to the war and established four Special Committees on key sectors, including defense, fuel, transportation, and food. The Special Committee on Food Supply, headed by economist P.V. Struve, added experts from the Union of Zemstvos and the Union of Cities to its ranks, drawing Groman into government work as representative of the Union of Cities. Groman once again focused upon agricultural production and distribution, helping to ensure that the grain supply needs of cities continued to be met adequately in the face of the competing demands of the military. Through Groman's initiative — and over the objection of mill owners — grain milling was standardized to a single grade of flour, thereby increasing output and helping to reduce upward price pressure.

In 1916 he worked with the Kadet, Mitrofan Voronkov to lobby for a lower fixed price for grain: originally over-ruled by Minister of Agriculture, Aleksei Bobrinsky, a spokesperson for landed interest, they would not let the matter drop and when the Minister of War, Dmitry Shuvayev became involved, Bobrinsky's policy was overthrown and Voronkov became a much quoted spokesperson on the topic.

=== Russian Revolution ===
Following the February Revolution the Soviet of Workers' and Soldiers' Deputies and the State Duma organized an All-Russian Food Supply Commission in Petrograd, with agricultural expert Groman named its chairman. With grain supplies for the massive army and the cities running low, a state grain monopoly was established, being regarded as an essential measure giving the magnitude of the crisis.

With the currency rapidly devaluing, establishment of fair market prices for grain were extremely difficult — a situation which Groman proposed solving by the issuance of supplemental certificates to be redeemed by the state at a future date. Groman's idea of postponing "full payment" for grain was narrowly defeated in the Food Supply Commission. This pricing problem also moved Groman to propose construction a "Unified Plan" to regulate labor and other aspects of the national economy. This idea was submitted to the Petrograd Soviet of Workers' and Soldiers' Deputies, but this unrealistically ambitious idea died without further action, with the provisional government embarking instead upon a more modest and achievable plan of partial regulatory measures favored by officials of the cooperative movement and moderate elements of the bureaucracy.

Groman's radical thinking about central planning was revisited and expanded by the Bolshevik regime headed by V.I. Lenin following the October Revolution.

After the Bolshevik seizure of power, the Food Supply Commissione tried to maintain their authority over food supply but were arrested on 27 November, being quickly released once they had accepted the authority of the Council of People's Commissars.

=== Soviet economist ===
In 1922 he joined Gosplan, where he collaborated closely with Vladimir Bazarov.

=== 1930 arrest and charges ===
Groman was arrested by the OGPU in the summer of 1930; his first interrogation for which there was a written report was dated 15 August. At that time he signed a handwritten statement for his interrogator, Yakov Agranov, acknowledging participation in a "group" with fellow Menshevik historian Nikolai Sukhanov which engaged in the "exchange of information" with other groups "hostile to the dictatorship of the proletariat." This conspiracy envisioned by the secret police connected the so-called "Groman group" with a (likely apocryphal) "Labor–Peasant Party" (TKP) headed by economist Nikolai Kondratiev as well as other "engineering-industrial organizations," although Groman could name none of these participants.

Groman sat in GPU prison for three months as the chekists made their case against him and others caught up in their operation, presumably undergoing additional interrogation during the process. In this more lengthy typewritten interrogation report, Groman now admitted being the leader of a "counterrevolutionary group" which prominently included Sukhanov and his associate Bazarov, as well as other former Mensheviks in the state economic planning bureaucracy, which operated in an active bloc with Kondratiev's "Labor–Peasant Party."

Said to have met in the homes of Groman and other leading participants, the Menshevik economic planners were said to have coordinated efforts "which highlighted all the negative aspects and difficulties arising from the policies being implemented...with the aim of influencing a shift away from the course of the country's socialist reconstruction." Groman indicated that "our practical counterrevolutionary activity constituted wrecking and were condemned in public speeches by Molotov, Ordzhonikidze, and Stalin."

In addition to pessimistic manipulation of economic control figures, Groman stated that his "counterrevolutionary work" had included a proposal to exempt "kulak farms" from taxation in 1928 and the provision of "a foreign-made typewriter and half a million rubles" to Sukhanov for the purpose of issuing a counterrevolutionary proclamation.

=== 1931 Menshevik Trial lead defendant ===
Groman was put on trial in 1931 as the most important of the 14 defendants in the 1931 Menshevik Trial.

According to the 1967 samizdat memoir account of his co-defendant Mikhail Yakubovich, Groman became embroiled with the Soviet secret police as a result of his friendship with the economist Nikolai Kondratiev, a former member of the former Socialist Revolutionary Party, with Groman being present at the latter's apartment in Moscow at the moment the OGPU arrived to arrest him. The story of a formal SR–Menshevik conspiracy was thus hatched, Yakubovich speculated. According to Yakubovich, "investigators promised Groman that if he cooperated in organizing the trial of the wrecker-Mensheviks he would be guaranteed a return to work followed by a full amnesty.

Later, when it became clear that his dutiful confession and accusation of others embroiled in the secret police's dragnet would not be rewarded with liberation but rather with a 10 year term of internment at the Verkhneuralsk politisolator [political prison], Yakubovich quotes Groman as plaintively wailing, "They deceived me! They deceived me!"

After deliberating for twenty-five hours, the court sentenced him to ten years' imprisonment.

=== Death and legacy ===
Groman died on March 11, 1940, while interned at the Verkhneuralsk politizoliator. He was 66 years old at the time of his death.

The official transcript of Groman's interrogations in connection with the 1931 Menshevik Trial was published as part of a scholarly two volume collection by the liberal and democratic Moscow publisher Russian Political Encyclopedia in 1999.

Groman was remembered by émigré Soviet economist Naum Jasny as "a giant of a man with great abilities and a great heart" whose principal features were "immense drive, great intuition, and honesty in the highest sense of the world."

Memorializing his former boss with a book chapter published in 1972, Jasny recalled:

"When I first met him he was a huge, heavy man, slightly over 40. He did not walk, he almost ran. Fat people often take small, delicate steps. Groman sauntered with long, heavy steps; you could hear him approaching from afar. He did open the door, he tore it open. He did not eat, he devoured, and his drinking was on a par with this.

Groman was very careful about figures, but immensely negigent about words written on the basis of the figures — words were a mere form and he had no understanding for form. Preparing for a trip to Moscow,...he would hastily dictate an important document to a typist, push the typescript into his pocket, drive off to the railway station, order a borshch, glance over the typing while gulping down the borsch, and send the thing off to the printer.... Groman's style was certainly not the best imaginable, and did not improve as time went on. Omissions of words occurred even in his published material."

== Works ==
- Vneshniaia torgovlia Rossii v. 1922–1923 khoziaistvennom godu: Sbornik statei [The Internal Trade of Russia in the 1922/23 Agricultural Year: A Collection of Articles] Editor, with F. Kaufman and M. Zamengof. Moscow: 1923.
