= Samardzija =

Samardzija or Samardžija is a surname. Notable people with the surname include:

- Bojan Samardžija (born 1985), Bosnian cross-country skier
- Jeff Samardzija (born 1985), American baseball player
- Miloš Samardžija (born 1920), Yugoslav economist
- Zoran Samardžija (born 1962), Bosnian footballer
