= Isaak Rubin =

Russian Marxist economist (1886–1937)

- Исаак Рубин
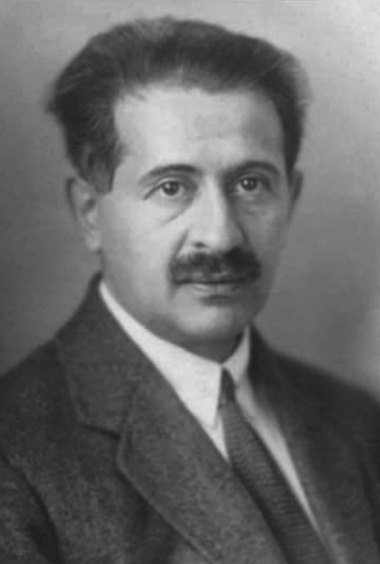
- Rubin in 1927
- Born: Isaak Illich Rubin; 12 June 1886; Dvinsk, Vitebsk Governorate, Russian Empire (now Daugavpils, Latvia)
- Died: 27 November 1937 (aged 51); Soviet Union
- Cause of death: Execution
- Education: Saint Petersburg Imperial University
- Known for: Work on the Marxist theory of value, commodity fetishism, history of economic thought

Isaak Illich Rubin (Russian: Исаак Ильич Рубин; 12 June 1886 – 27 November 1937) was a Russian Marxist economist who is considered one of the most important exponents of Karl Marx's value-form theory. His major work, Essays on Marx's Theory of Value, was first published in 1923 and went through four editions in the Soviet Union. He also wrote A History of Economic Thought and several other works on Marxist political economy.

A member of the Jewish Bund and later the Mensheviks, Rubin was a critic of the October Revolution. His scholarship, while internationally recognized, brought him into conflict with the Soviet authorities. After a series of arrests and periods of exile beginning in 1921, he was attacked during the late 1920s in a campaign against so-called "Rubinshchina" (Russian for "Rubinism"), which condemned his work as an idealistic deviation from orthodox Marxism. Following his arrest in 1930, Rubin was forced to serve as a key defendant in the 1931 Menshevik Trial. After serving his sentence in prison and exile, he was arrested again during the Great Purge and executed in 1937. He was fully rehabilitated in the Soviet Union between 1989 and 1991.

== Biography ==
=== Early life and political activity ===
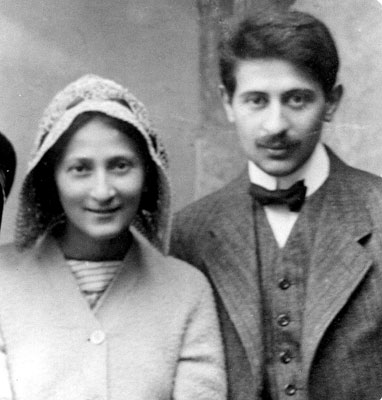
Rubin with his wife, Polina Petrovna, in 1910

Isaak Rubin was born on 12 June 1886 in Dvinsk, Russian Empire (now Daugavpils, Latvia), to a well-to-do Jewish family. After attending a religious elementary school (cheder) and a classical gymnasium, he enrolled in the law faculty of Saint Petersburg Imperial University in 1906. There, he studied economics under Mikhail Tugan-Baranovsky and I.I. Kaufman, graduating in 1910 as a specialist in economic science and civil law. In 1910 he married Polina Petrovna.

Rubin became politically active in 1904, joining the General Jewish Labour Bund. He was arrested in 1905 but was released under an amnesty following the October Manifesto. After graduating, he was barred from an academic career and worked as a barrister in Moscow, focusing on labour law. During World War I, he was active in organisations providing aid to the war effort.

Rubin did not support the October Revolution of 1917, fearing it would lead to a counter-revolution if defeated. He remained active in the Menshevik-aligned wing of the Bund after it split with its pro-Bolshevik faction in 1920, and he was elected Secretary of the Bund's Central Committee. At this time, he advocated for trade unions to be independent of the state, describing them as "organs of proletarian class spontaneity that are constructed from top to bottom on the electoral principle".

=== Persecution and scholarly work in prison ===
Rubin's leadership role in the Bund led to his arrest on 20 February 1921. He was released on bail, but arrested again on the night of 5–6 November 1921. His academic colleagues, including the historian and rector of Moscow State University (MGU) Viacheslav Volgin, the Commissar of Education Anatoly Lunacharsky, and his friend David Riazanov, the director of the newly founded Marx-Engels Institute, successfully petitioned for his release. On 22 November 1921, the Cheka released him into the custody of the university rector.

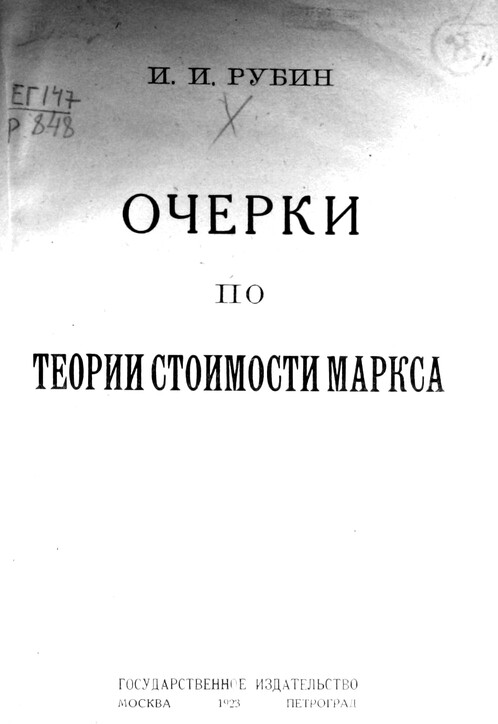
Title page of the first edition of Essays on Marx's Theory of Value (1923)

During the year and three months of freedom that followed, Rubin taught at MGU and the Institute of Red Professors and prepared the first edition of his major work, Essays on Marx's Theory of Value. In 1922, he also co-edited Fundamental Problems of Economics, a collection of translated articles by prominent European Marxists such as Otto Bauer, Rudolf Hilferding, and Karl Kautsky. He was arrested for a third time on 27 February 1923, beginning a period of imprisonment and exile that would last over three and a half years. He was initially sentenced to three years in the Archangelsk concentration camp, which, given his poor health, was considered a death sentence. After his colleagues again interceded, his sentence was commuted to exile in the Crimean peninsula, beginning in December 1924.

Despite the harsh conditions of his imprisonment, Rubin's scholarly output was prolific. Between 1923 and his return to Moscow in late 1926, he completed approximately twenty scientific works, including an expanded second edition of his Essays on Marx's Theory of Value, translations of works by Karl Marx and Adam Smith, and several original books and articles. He was so dedicated to his work that in December 1924, when his release from Butyrka prison was ordered, he successfully requested a postponement of several days to complete the final editing of a 450-page manuscript. While publishing successive editions of his Essays on Value, he was also furtively drafting a manuscript for a companion volume, Essays on Marx's Theory of Money.

=== "Rubinshchina" and the Menshevik Trial ===
After his release from exile, Rubin began working at the Marx-Engels Institute in Moscow under Riazanov, where he headed the office of political economy. In 1928, a public campaign was launched against him and his work. This campaign, known as the "Rubinshchina" ("Rubinism"), condemned his Essays on Marx's Theory of Value for "idealism" and "falsification" of Marxism. The campaign was part of a broader shift in the Soviet Union away from the relative intellectual freedom of the New Economic Policy (NEP) period towards the dogmatism of the Stalinist era. Rubin was hounded in the press; in later editions of his Essays, he engaged with his critics, such as I.I. Dashkovsky, Semen Shabs, Aleksandr Kon, and Sergey Bessonov, adding an appendix titled "Reply to Critics". In 1930, a brochure titled Rubinshchina or Marxism? was published to denounce his views, and he was forced to resign from the Institute.

On the night of 23–24 December 1930, Rubin was arrested by the OGPU (the secret police) and implicated in the preparations for the 1931 Menshevik Trial, a show trial organised by Stalin against former Mensheviks. After being subjected to what his sister described as "endless interrogation, beatings, solitary confinement ... humiliation and torture," Rubin was forced to sign a false confession and implicate his friend and protector, Riazanov. At the trial in March 1931, Rubin was sentenced to five years of imprisonment.

=== Final years and death ===
In 1933, Rubin's prison sentence was commuted to three years of exile in Turgay and then Aktobe, in Kazakhstan. He worked there as a plan-economist in a local consumer co-operative.

During the Great Purge, Rubin was arrested again on 19 November 1937 and charged with forming a counter-revolutionary organisation. He was sentenced to death by a troika on 25 November and executed two days later, on 27 November 1937. A list of manuscripts seized at the time of his arrest included a 380-page work on Johann Karl Rodbertus, a 429-page work on the Anglo-American school of economics, and eight notebooks on the theory of economic crises; these works were most likely destroyed. Rubin was unconditionally rehabilitated by the Soviet government in 1989–91.

== Economic thought ==
Isaak Rubin's scholarship was dedicated to the argument that "historically formed social relations between people are the proper subject matter of political economy". His work was a "dialectical reading of Marx's economic works", emphasising their philosophical foundations in the system of Georg Wilhelm Friedrich Hegel. Following Vladimir Lenin's insight that Marx's Capital could not be understood without having mastered Hegel's Science of Logic, Rubin traced the dialectical development of economic categories from the "cell" of the commodity to the complex forms of capitalist society.

=== Theory of value and fetishism ===
Diagram illustrating Marx's theory of value

Rubin's most significant contribution was his work on Marx's theory of value, particularly his elaboration of commodity fetishism and the value-form theory. He argued that many misinterpretations of Marx stemmed from a failure to grasp the theory's methodological foundations. For Rubin, the "dual character of labour" as both concrete-useful labour and abstract labour was Marx's central theoretical discovery. This duality, he argued, reflects the fundamental contradiction of a commodity-producing economy: a society of formally independent private producers who are materially interdependent through the social division of labour.

In such a society, the social relations between producers are not consciously organised but are established spontaneously through the exchange of the products of their labour. The labour of individuals, which is private and concrete, can only become social labour when its product is equated with all other products on the market. This process of equation, which takes the form of value, requires that the specific, concrete qualities of labour are abstracted from, leaving only "abstract human labour". Value is thus not a natural property of a thing, but a "social form" that the product of labour acquires in a commodity economy. The production relations between people become "reified", appearing as properties of things. This "reification of the relations of production" is the essence of commodity fetishism. In his analysis, Rubin viewed value from three aspects: as the magnitude of value (a regulator of the quantitative distribution of social labour), the form of value (an expression of social production relations), and the substance of value (an expression of abstract labour).

This interpretation distinguished Rubin's work from both his classical and neoclassical contemporaries. Against the Austrian School, he argued that their focus on subjective utility ignored the social forms that made exchange possible. Against the followers of David Ricardo, he argued that while they correctly identified labour as the content or "substance" of value, they failed to analyse the specific social form of value that was unique to capitalism. By elaborating on this social form, Rubin concluded, Marx was not merely a follower of Ricardo, but the "originator of an entirely new economic theory".

=== Production and consumption ===
Rubin also defended Marx against the common criticism that he ignored the role of consumption and use-value in his economic theory. Rubin attributed this critique to the marginalist preoccupation with individual subjective judgments of utility. He argued that for Marx, consumption is a moment in the overall process of social reproduction, and human needs are not a static, natural given but are themselves a product of history, developing in tandem with the means of production.

In a commodity-producing society, production is separated from consumption, and the direct goal of production becomes exchange-value rather than use-value. This process reaches its peak in capitalism, where the "primacy of exchange-value over use-value becomes all the more evident". While use-value is a necessary precondition for any commodity, it does not determine its value. Instead, Rubin argued, use-value is taken into account by Marx's theory only insofar as it is necessary to understand the "determinations of economic form", such as the distinction between constant and variable capital, or the material requirements of social reproduction as a whole.

== Legacy ==
Rubin's work was highly regarded in the West after his Essays on Marx's Theory of Value was first translated into English in 1972, but it remained suppressed in the Soviet Union until the late 1980s. The first English translation was based on the third (1928) edition of the Essays and played an important role in the "rediscovery" of Rubin's work. The editors of Responses to Marx's Capital, Richard B. Day and Daniel F. Gaido, describe Rubin as a "remarkable Marxist scholar" whose essay on the dialectical development of categories was a "theoretical triumph on Rubin's part that far surpassed the insight of almost all of his predecessors and contemporaries". The biographical essay by Lyudmila Vasina and Yakov Rokityansky, originally published in 1992, was a key part of the scholarly effort to "restore Isaak I. Rubin to his proper place in the history of Marxist scholarship".

== Selected publications ==
=== Chief works ===
- Rubin, Isaak Illich: Essays on Marx's Theory of Value. Translated by Milos Samardzija and Fredy Perlman from the third edition, Moscow, Leningrad 1928. Fourth Printing. Montreal, New York 1990.
- Rubin, Isaak Illich: Essays on Marx's Theory of Value. Conceived as a Variorum Edition (Historical Materialism Band 339) Brill, Leiden 2025, ISBN 978-90-04-72133-3.

=== Further publications ===
==== Books ====
- Rubin, Isaac Ilych: A History of Economic Thought Inklinks 1979. Translated and edited by Donald Filtzer from 2nd Revised Russian ed 1929.
- Rubin, Isaac Ilych: Essays on Marx's Theory of Money (1926–8) translated in Day and Gaido, 619-727.

==== Articles ====
- "Marx’s Teaching on Production and Consumption" (1930), translated Day and Gaido, 448-535
- "Fundamental Features of Marx’s Theory of Value and How it Differs from Ricardo’s Theory" (1924), translated Day and Gaido, 536-582
- "Towards a History of the Text of the First Chapter of Marx’s Capital" (1929), translated Day and Gaido, 583-618
- "The Dialectical Development of Categories in Marx’s Economic System" (1929) translated Day and Gaido, 728-818
- "Abstract Labour and Value in Marx’s System" (1927), translated by Kathleen Gilbert.
- "Ricardo's Doctrine of Capital" (1936-7), note discovered by Vasina and Rokityanskii, English 1992
