= Lazar Zalkind =

Ukrainian economist and chess composer

Lazar Borisovich Zalkind
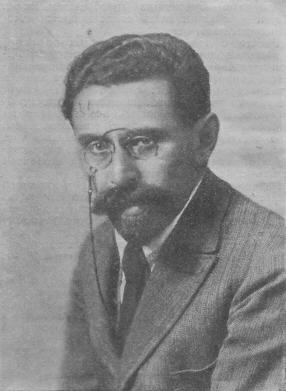
- Lazar Zalkind in 1928
- Born: 14 January 1886 [O.S. 2 January] Kharkov, Kharkov Governorate, Russian Empire
- Died: 25 June 1945 (aged 59); Komsomolsk-on-Amur, Soviet Union
- Occupations: Economist, chess composer

Lazar Borisovich Zalkind (Russian: Лазарь Борисович Залкинд; 14 January 1886 [O.S. 2 January] – 25 June 1945) was a Ukrainian economist and chess composer.

Born in Kharkov in 1886, Zalkind's family moved to Kostroma when he was a child. He joined the Russian Social Democratic Labour Party in 1903. He studied economics at Imperial Moscow University and worked as an assistant professor there after completing his degree. He was baptized when he married N. V. Andreeva in 1909. He continued his career as an economist at the People's Commissariat of Trade, where he was promoted to head of the accounting and statistical sector by the late 1920s.

Zalkind became interested in chess when he was fifteen. He published his first chess composition in 1903, and soon established himself as a leading chess composer in Russia during the 1910s and 1920s. He created more than 500 compositions, and edited the problem columns in the magazines Shakhmatny Vestnik (1913–1916) and Shakhmaty (1922–1929). From 1926, he headed the Society of Chess Problems and Studies Fans of the All-Union Chess Section.

In 1930, Zalkind was arrested for his role in a supposed plot to infiltrate the Bolshevik government with pro-Mensheviks. He was convicted in the 1931 Menshevik Trial and sentenced to eight years in the OGPU political prison in Verkhneuralsk. He then spent five more years at a labour camp in Komsomolsk-on-Amur. He was finally released in 1943, but was not permitted to leave Komsomolsk. At that point he learned that his 18-year-old son Boris had died on the Eastern Front.

Zalkind died of a heart attack in 1945. He was posthumously rehabilitated.
