= Aron Sokolovsky =

Soviet economist

Aron L'vovich Sokolovsky (1884–?) was a Soviet economist who was put on trial in the 1931 Menshevik Trial. He was sentenced to eight years imprisonment.

== Political development ==
Sokolovsky's political trajectory took him from the Zionist Socialist Workers Party through the United Jewish Socialist Workers Party (on the central committee of which he served) before joining the Bund and finally becoming a member of the Communist Party.

== Career as an economist ==
In 1921, he joined the VSNKh, and by 1923 had become a key worker there. He was head of the section on trade prices and chairman of the Bureau of Prices. His work was in accordance with the views of Felix Dzerzhinsky, head of VSNKh, and was indeed publicly praised by him. His career was brought to an abrupt halt when he was put on trial as part of the 1931 Menshevik Trial.

== Publications ==
- The Problems of Raw Materials (1924)
- Production Costs in State Industry (1926)
