= Boris Berlatsky =

Boris Markovich Berlatsky (1889–1937) was a senior official of the State Bank of the USSR. He was 41 when he was a defendant in 1931 Menshevik Trial, one of the first show trials in the Soviet Union.

Berlatsky's "confession" included an account of how he met with Fyodor Dan, Rudolph Hilferding, Vandervelde, Karl Kautsky and Léon Blum while in Berlin in 1925. He was sentenced to four years in prison.

== Biography ==
He was born in Soroca, Bessarabia Governorate, into a Jewish bourgeois family. He studied commercial affairs in St. Petersburg, but did not graduate. He was a member of the Russian Social Democratic Labor Party (Menshevik) until it was banned in 1922.

Starting in 1910 he worked as a teacher in Soroca, while serving from 1914 to 1917 with the Refugee Assistance Committee. In 1917, he returned to his business studies in Petrograd. After the February Revolution of 1917, he was a member of the council of the Moskovsky district of Petrograd and a member of the city government of Petrograd. He was a member of the Petrograd City Food Administration, then later a member of the Bureau for the Management of Cooperative Offices of the Central Union for Siberia and the Far East. In 1918, he was the extraordinary commissioner of the Northern Food Administration, organized to supply grain to Moscow, Petrograd and all northern non-food producing provinces. In Omsk, he created the Bureau of West Siberian agents for the purchase of grain from representatives of various provinces. From March 1919 to March 1920 he worked as manager of the office of the Central Union of the RSFSR in Japan.

In 1920 he was elected as a member of the Vladivostok City Duma. In May 1920 he became a member of the People's Assembly of Primorye and was a member of the Council of Management of Departments (Government) of Primorye, the Deputy Chairman of the Government and Manager of the Department of Finance. From May 1, 1920, he also headed the food commission of the Vladivostok city government and from January 5, 1921, the financial and budgetary commission.

After the coup of the Merkulov brothers set up the breakaway Provisional Priamurye Government in the far east of Russia in May 1921, he moved to Chita, where in 1921-1922 he was a comrade (deputy) minister, then minister of finance of the Far Eastern Republic. Beginning in December 1921 he served as Chairman of the Organizing Bureau of the Bank of the Far Eastern Republic. On March 7, 1922, the government of the Republic approved the bank's charter. The founders of the bank were the Narkomfin of the Government of the Far Eastern Republic (7813 out of 9911 shares), D.V.S.P.S. (600 shares), Far Eastern Branch of Tsentrosoyuz (200 shares), Sibdalgostorg (1000 shares), Chita Railway Consumer Society (69 shares), as well as private traders (including B. M. Berlatsky); The bank's fixed capital was 495,569 rubles 89 kopecks[6].

From March 1922 to September 1924 he was the first chairman of the board of the Far Eastern Bank, at the same time in 1923-1924 he was one of the organizers and member of the board of Mongolbank in Ulaanbaatar. Beginning in June 1922 he was the chairman of the Board of the Far Eastern Bank (Dalbank) in Harbin.

From October 1924 to December 1930 he was a member of the Board of the State Bank of the USSR. From October 1924 he served as a member of the Council of the Vneshtorgbank of the USSR from the State Bank, at the same time from 1927 he was a member of the council of Elektrobank, in 1928-1929 he worked as a member of the council of Soyuzzoloto, in 1928 he held the position of deputy chairman of a special meeting on the gold industry at the People's Commissariat of Finance of the USSR. In August 1925, he was sent with a delegation to the United States for negotiations with Amtorg; on the way, he visited Berlin, where, according to the confession given under investigation, he met with representatives of the Menshevik emigration.

== Purge and rehabilitation ==
On December 2, 1930, he was arrested in the case of the “Union Bureau of the Mensheviks”. According to the accusation, “he was part of a cell of the counter-revolutionary organization of Russian Social Democrats (Mensheviks) located in the State Bank of the USSR”. On March 9, 1931, he was sentenced to eight years of forced labor camps and three years of loss of rights under Art. 58–7, 10, 11; he was imprisoned in the Verkhneuralsk political isolation ward, then in the Balashov prison (Leningrad region), where, according to official data, he died on December 3, 1937. He was rehabilitated posthumously on March 13, 1991.

== Publications and other activities ==
He was the author of the article “Essays on money circulation and credit in the Far East” in the magazine “Credit and Banks” (1923, No. 1, pp. 9–12), as well as other works on the history of money circulation in the Far East in the first years after the 1917 revolution, and books such as “Credit Reform in Questions and Answers” (with A. A. Blum, 1930).

He was known as a collector of paper banknotes (bons). At the First All-Union Exhibition on Philately, Numismatics and Bonistics in Moscow in 1924–1925, he was awarded a Small Silver Medal for the exceptional rarity of the exhibit “Bons of Mongolia” he exhibited - an issue of the Mongolian authorities together with Baron Ungern: six percent obligations of 1921 in 10, 25, 50 and 100 dollars with images of a ram, a bull, a horse and a camel (collected a complete set of six percent obligations of the Mongolian State Treasury). In 1925, his collection numbered two thousand bonds.
