= Vladimir Central Prison =

Prison in Vladimir, Russia

Coordinates: 56.141545°N 40.432662°E

Vladimir Central
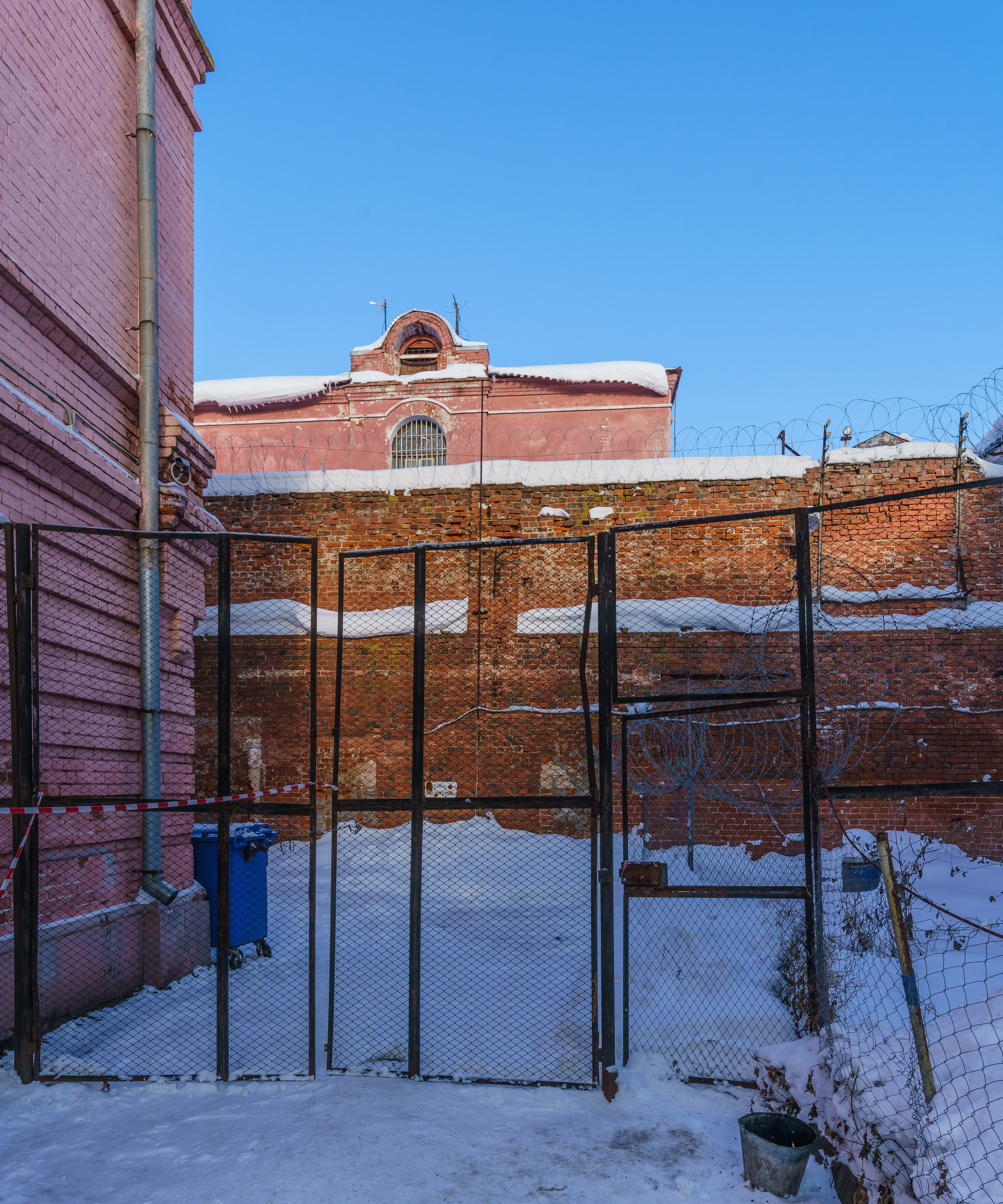
- Interactive map of Vladimir Central
- Location: Vladimir, Russia
- Capacity: 1220
- Opened: 1783
- Managed by: Federal Penitentiary Service
- Governor: Alexei Nikolaevich Klimov

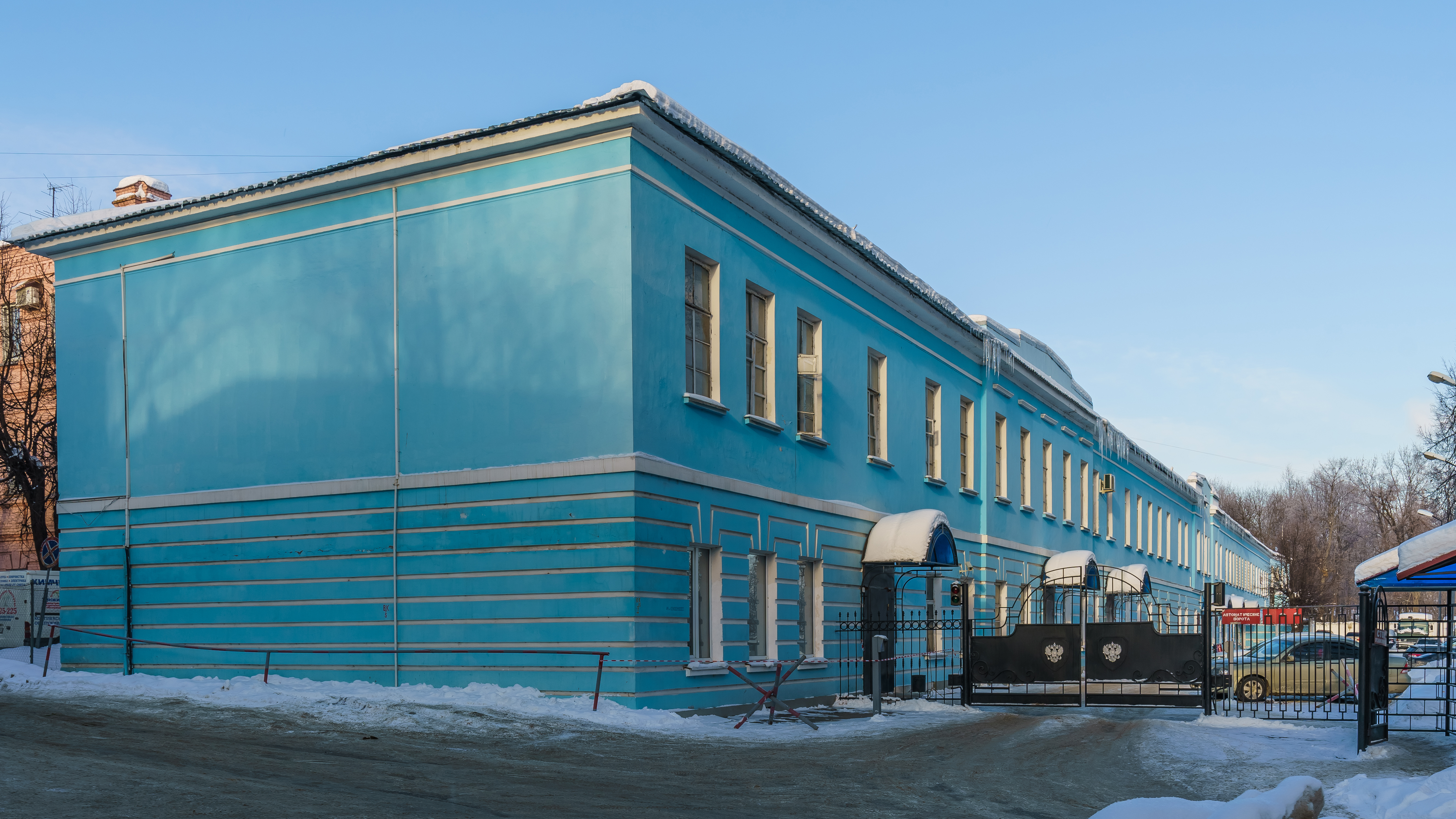
The prison gate and administration building

Vladimir Prison, popularly known as Vladimir Central (Russian: Владимирский централ), is a prison in Vladimir, Russia. It is the second-largest prison in Russia, with a capacity of 1,220 detainees, and is operated by the Federal Penitentiary Service as a maximum-security prison with most inmates serving a minimum of ten years to life sentences.

== History ==
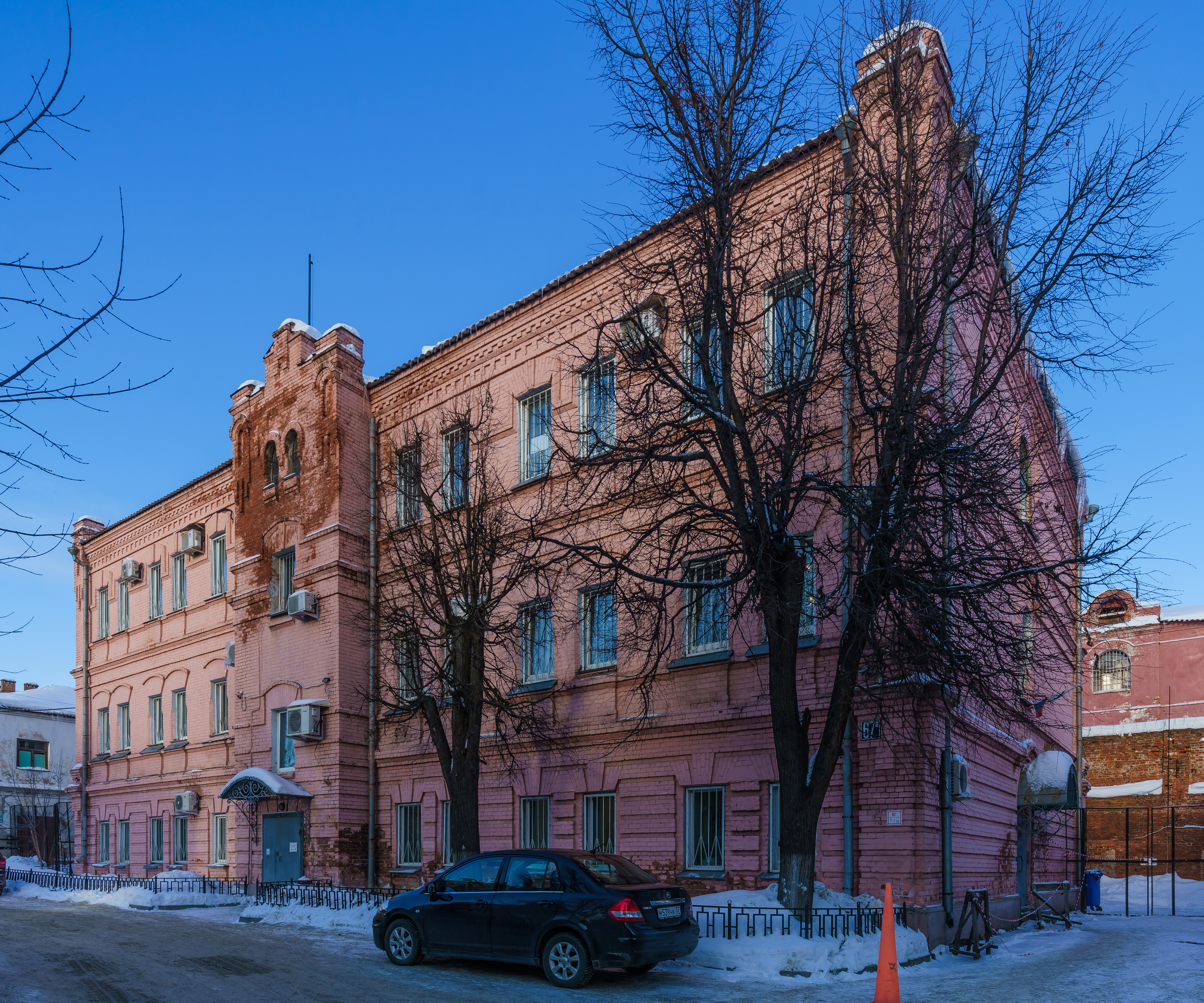
The Frunzensky District courthouse at the prison

Vladimir Prison was established by the Russian Empire in 1783 by decree of Empress Catherine II It is located about 160 kilometres (100 mi) northeast of Moscow. The building began construction in 1781, and was completed on August 15, 1783. The architect was Nikolai von Berg. In 1906, it became known as Vladimir Central and contained political prisoners. At the beginning of 1921, shortly after the rise of the Bolsheviks to power, Vladimir Central became the first of several special-purpose prisons, politisolators, intended to incarcerate opponents of the regime.

Vladimir Central was later part of the system of "special camps and prisons" organized on the basis of the USSR Council of Ministers resolution No. 416-159 February 21, 1948 "On the organization of the Ministry of Internal Affairs camps with a strict regime for keeping particularly dangerous state criminals". The resolution widened the range of political prisoners for the detention in Vladimir, including spies, saboteurs, terrorists, Trotskyites, Mensheviks, Socialist-Revolutionaries, anarchists, ethnic nationalists, white émigrés, participants in other anti-Soviet organizations, and those with ties to any anti-Soviet or enemy activities. The last official name of the prison was "Vladimir special prison of the MGB of the USSR".

After the dissolution of the Soviet Union, the prison became a regular detention facility. In 1996, a museum about Vladimir Prison was opened on the prison grounds.

Vladimir Prison was for many years the largest prison in Russia, with a capacity for a maximum of 1220 detainees. It has since been surpassed by Kresty-2 Prison, which reopened in 2017 with more than twice the capacity of Vladimir Prison.

Vladimir prison is an institution for especially dangerous criminals: members of organized crime groups, murderers, killers, maniacs, rapists, repeat offenders with three or four convictions. Some have been sentenced to life imprisonment.

== Popular culture ==
Vladimir Prison is the subject of the songs Jewish Prisoner and Vladimir Central by the singer-songwriter Mikhail Krug.

== Notable inmates ==
- Vasily Dzhugashvili, son of Joseph Stalin.
- Jan Stanisław Jankowski, Polish politician.
- Paul Ludwig Ewald von Kleist, German field marshal.
- Johan Laidoner, Estonian commander-in-chief of the Estonian Army.
- Yosef Mendelevitch, Jewish Refusenik dissident.
- Alexei Navalny, Russian opposition politician
- Garegin Nzhdeh, Armenian general and former Dashnak revolutionary activist.
- Unto Parvilahti, SS-Officer
- Francis Gary Powers, American pilot, shot down in a U2 spy plane on 1 May 1960, imprisoned here until February 1962.
- Mečislovas Reinys, Lithuanian Roman Catholic bishop.
- Natan Sharansky, Jewish Refusenik dissident.
- Klymentiy Sheptytsky, archimandrite of the Ukrainian Greek Catholic Church.
- Serhiy Yefremov, Ukrainian socialist federalist.
- Dušan Letica, Serbian fascist politician.
- Stepan Petrichenko, Russian Anarchist, head of the Kronstadt rebellion
- Andras Toma, a Hungarian soldier taken prisoner by Red Army in 1945, and remained in detention until 2000.
- Helmuth Weidling, German Officer taken prisoner in 1945.
- Vladimir Retunsky, serial killer.
