= Ivan Kraskovsky =

Ukrainian-Belarusian politician

- Іван Красковський; Іван Краскоўскі
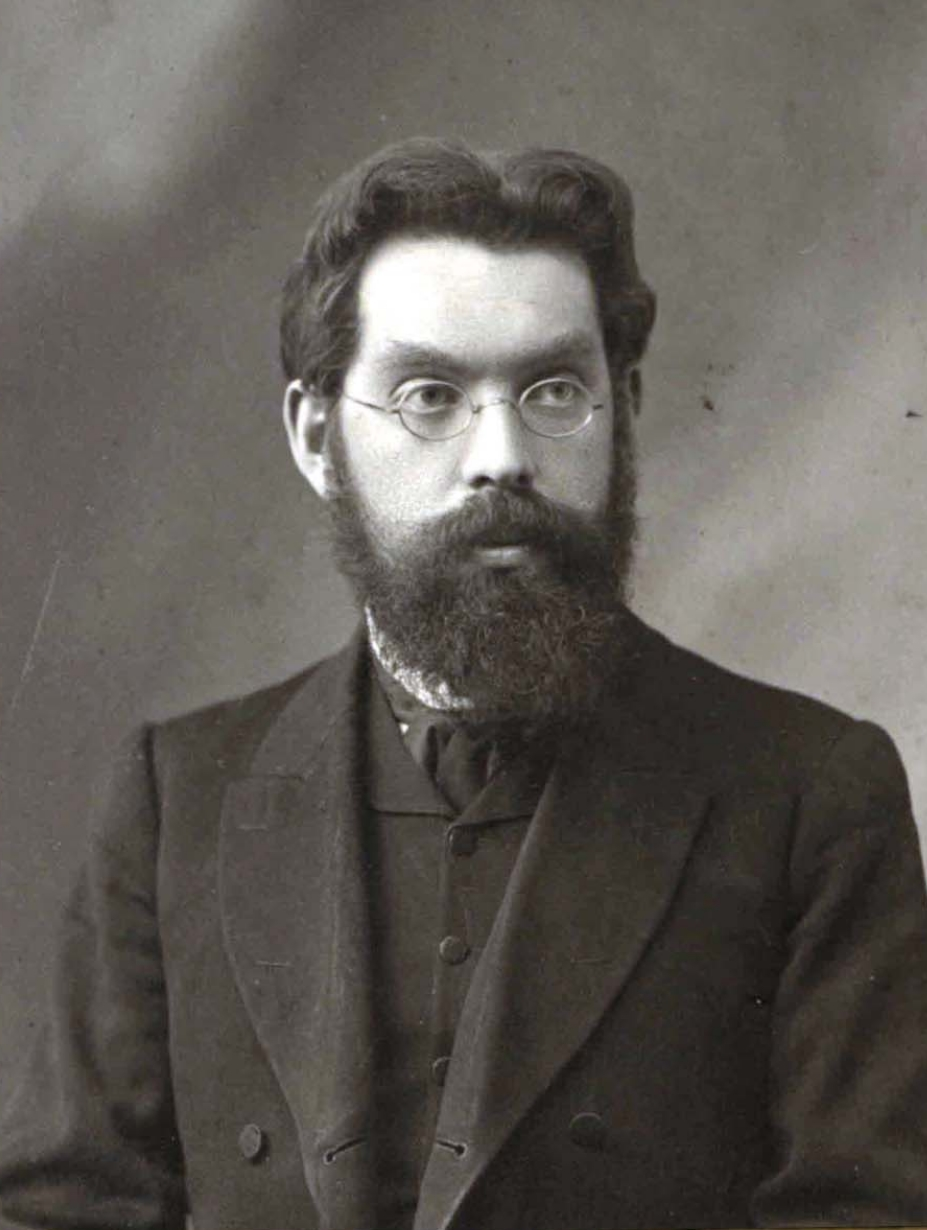

Ukrainian People's Republic Ambassador to Democratic Republic of Georgia
- In office 1917–1920

Ukrainian People's Republic Ambassador to Kuban People's Republic
- In office 1917–1920

Belarusian People's Republic official representative at negotiations with the Ukrainian People's Republic and Soviet Russia
- In office 1918–1918

Member of the Presidium of the Gosplan of the BSSR
- In office 1930–1930

Personal details
- Born: 24 June 1880 Dubichy Tsarkounyya, Vilna Governorate-General, Russian Empire
- Died: August 23, 1955 (aged 75) Bratislava, Czechoslovakia
- Party: Belarusian Socialist Assembly; Ukrainian Party of Socialists-Federalists
- Profession: Historian, economist

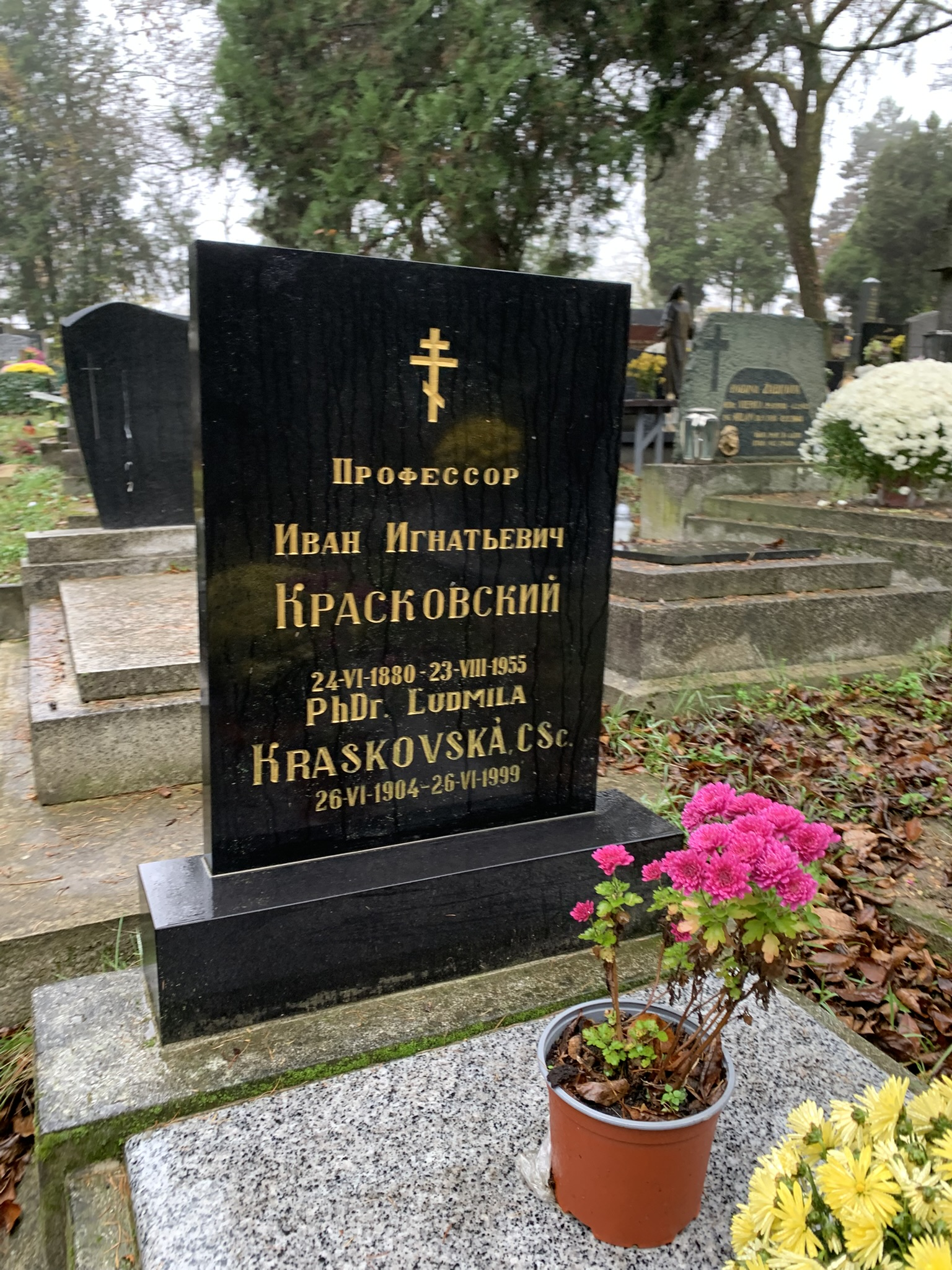
Grave of Ivan Kraskovsky at the Slávičie údolie cemetery in Bratislava

Ivan Hnatovych Kraskovsky (Note: Also transliterated as Kraskovskyi) (Ukrainian: Іван Гнатович Красковський; Belarusian: Іван Ігнатавіч Краскоўскі, romanized: Ivan Ihnatavich Kraskowski; 24 June 1880 – 23 August 1955) was a Ukrainian-Belarusian politician active in the Ukrainian Party of Socialists-Federalists and earlier in the Belarusian Socialist Assembly.

Kraskovsky was a student at Warsaw University. He was appointed to the All-Russian Union of Cities in 1916. Following the February Revolution of 1917 he was a gubernial commissioner of the Russian Provisional Government in the Ternopil region. Then in January 1918 he became a deputy minister of the Ukrainian National Republic (UNR) serving under Volodymyr Vynnychenko. Under the Hetman government he was a member of the Council of the Ministry of Foreign Affairs, becoming the diplomatic representative of the UNR in Georgia and Kuban. While in Kyiv, Kraskovsky also served as an advisor to the diplomatic representation of the Belarusian Democratic Republic and as Belarus' official representative at negotiations with Soviet Russia.

In 1925 he moved to Belarus. Here he was appointed as a lecturer at the Belarusian State University. He also worked at the Institute of Belarusian Culture and as a member of the Presidium of the Gosplan of the Belarusian Soviet Socialist Republic.

In 1930 he was arrested by the OGPU within the Case of the Union of Liberation of Belarus. Having spent almost ten years in a deportation in Samara, he was eventually allowed to leave the USSR and settle with his daughter in Bratislava, Czechoslovakia.
