= Essays on Marx's Theory of Value =

Marxist economy book by Isaak Ilich Rubin

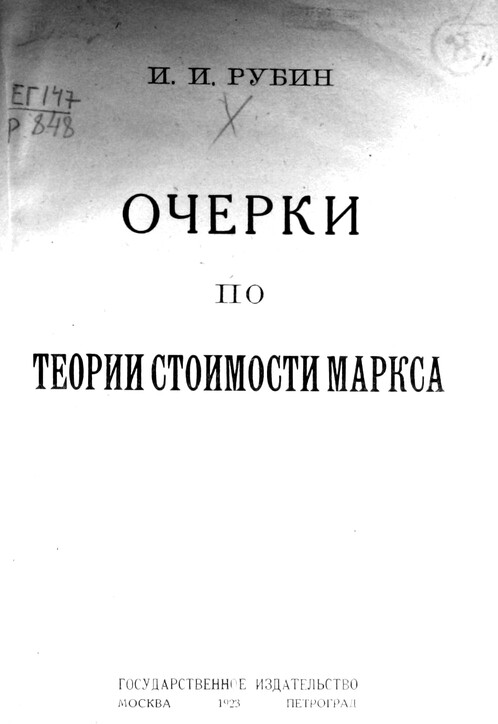
- Title page of the first edition, 1923
- Author: Isaak Illich Rubin
- Original title: Очерки по теории стоимости Маркса
- Translator: Miloš Samardžija and Fredy Perlman
- Language: English
- Publication date: 1923
- Publication place: United Kingdom

Essays on Marx's Theory of Value (Russian: Очерки по теории стоимости Маркса, Ocherki po teorii stoimosti Marksa) is a book by the Soviet economist Isaak Illich Rubin.

Очерки по теории стоимости Маркса, the Russian language edition was first published in 1923. For many years, it was thought that there had only been three editions published in the Soviet Union until a copy of the fourth edition, 1929/1930, was discovered in the papers of Ichiro Nakayama deposited at the library of Hitotsubashi University. It is estimated that 10,000 copies were printed. The sole change in the fourth edition is an inclusion of "Replies to critics" which responds to criticism by S. Bessonov.

The English translation was made by Miloš Samardžija and Fredy Perlman of the third edition in 1967, translating the book first into Serbo-Croatian. Samardžija travelled to the Soviet Union and requested access to a copy of the book at the V. I. Lenin State Library of the USSR was escorted off the premises empty handed. However, Perlman was able to locate a copy in the Library of Congress. Their translation was published by Black & Red, a publishing house that Perlman had set up in Detroit in 1971. In 1973, Black & Red planned to produce a reprint; Fredy Perlman's widow, Lorraine Perlman, was to describe the conflict which was to arise out of their attempt to collaborate with Black Rose press of Montreal. In the end Black & Red produced a reprint, and Black Rose also produced an edition.

In 2025, a new edition and translation by Susumu Takenaga appeared. As a 'variorum' edition, it incorporates the changes through the different editions. It gives an account of the early Soviet controversies and a translates a number of additional essays written by Rubin and also his opponents and defenders during the Rubin controversies of the period.
