= Abram Ginzburg =

Russian revolutionary and economist

Abram Moiseevich Ginzburg (Russian: Абра́м Моисе́евич Ги́нзбург; 1878–1937) was a Russian revolutionary and economist. He was a defendant at the 1931 Menshevik Trial.

Ginzburg was born in Ilyino in Zapadnodvinsky District and died in Chelyabinsk.
