= Minus Six =

Pop rock band formed in the quad cities

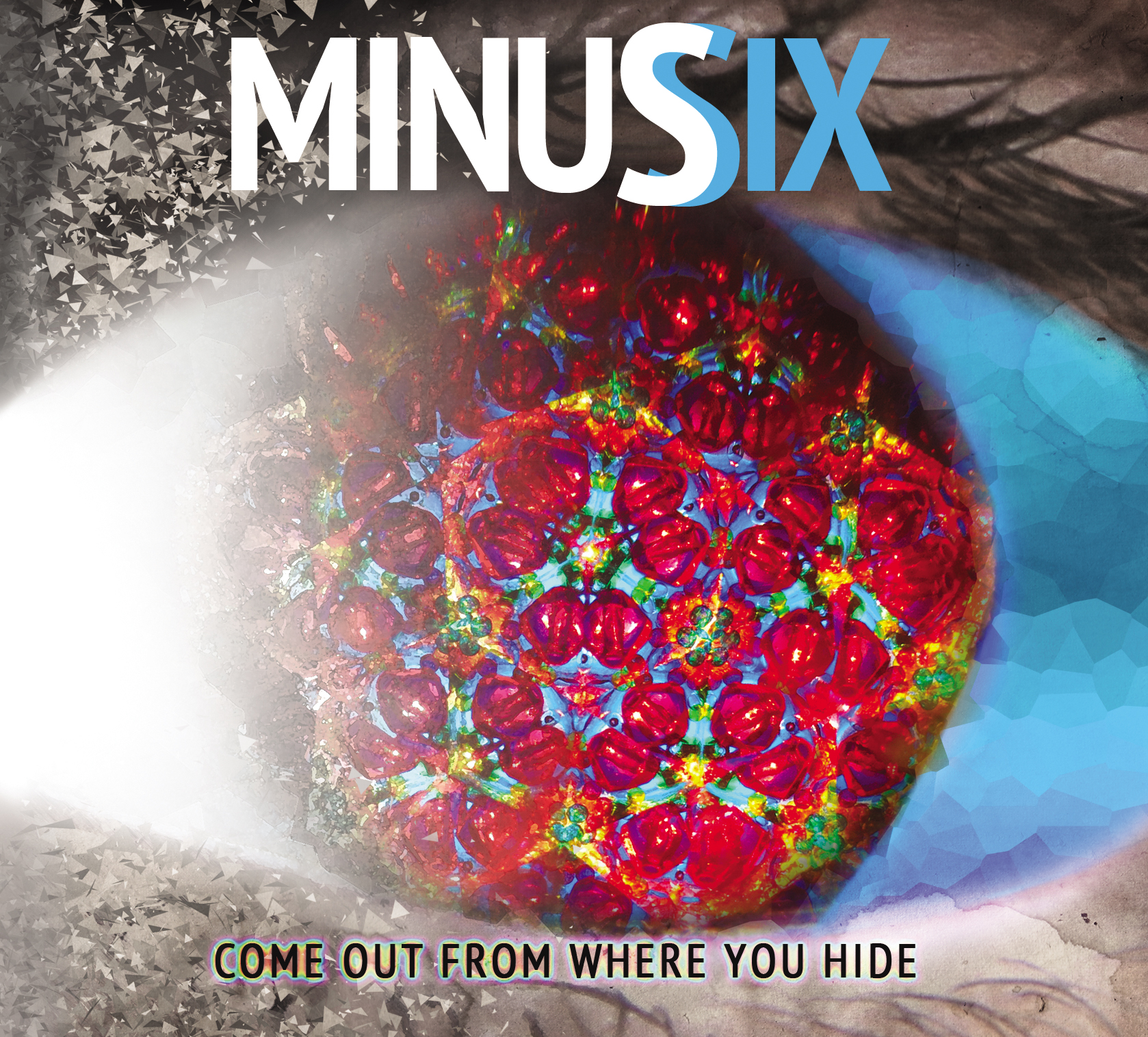

Background information
- Origin: Quad Cities, Illinois/Iowa, United States
- Genres: Pop rock
- Years active: 2003–present
- Members: Kevin Carton; Kameron Rummans; Matt Sivertsen; Rob Baner
- Past members: Jamie Hopkins; Tyler Kaschke
- Website: minussix.com

Minus Six is a piano-based pop rock group based out of the Quad Cities area. Formed in 2003, the band has produced four studio albums and a live album. Minus Six has not played continuously since 2003, and has taken two hiatuses - for three months in summer of 2010 and the other from mid-2011 to mid-2012, both a result of lead singer and piano player Kevin Carton's travels. In addition to Carton, the band features Kameron Rummans on bass, Matt Sivertsen on saxophone, and Rob Baner on drums Former members include Jamie Hopkins and Tyler Kaschke, both former drummers. Minus Six takes its name from its lack of six string guitar, a standard instrument in their genre. Instead, they rely on piano, saxophone, and bass guitar to provide melodic backing.

== History ==
=== Overdue & Some Things Change ===
Minus Six was started in 2003, and recorded their first album, Overdue, in a basement studio when the majority of its original four members (Carton, Rummans, Sivertsen, and Kaschke) were still in high school. Following this first effort, a meeting with Matchbox Twenty-affiliated producer Joe Hand encouraged the band members to pursue their music more seriously, resulting in a more professionally produced second album, Some Things Change, in 2005.

=== Hidden Deep in the Green ===
Between the 2005 release of Some Things Change and the 2007 release of their next studio album, Hidden Deep in the Green, Kaschke left the band and drummer Rob Baner joined the ensemble. Hidden Deep in the Green was described as having "the vibe of a musical-theatre soundtrack," praised for Carton's strong musical skills and Sivertsen's saxophone lines, but also billed as straightforward, with a lack of dynamic change to add interest.

=== Lucid Dreams ===
Following Hidden Deep in the Green, Minus Six went on a series of hiatuses to allow Carton to travel. They returned with drummer Jamie Hopkins in 2012 for the live album Lucid Dreams, which featured live versions of songs from previous albums, sometimes significantly reworked from their older iterations, as well as songs that would later be recorded in-studio.

=== Come Out From Where You Hide ===
By 2013, Baner had returned as drummer for the release of the band's fourth studio album, Come Out From Where You Hide. Come Out From Where You Hide featured professionally recorded versions of several of the songs first heard on Lucid Dreams, as well as several songs that had not been previously recorded. Come Out From Where You Hide displays strong influence from Carton's travels to France and Africa. Carton (who wrote all fifteen songs for the album) also made an effort to vary the construction of the music and include diverse topics - not just love songs. The attempts at variety were praised, and the songs were once again compared to musical theater, but as with Hidden Deep in the Green, critics found the songs to be too much alike.

=== Up Top the Storm ===
Minus Six released their fifth studio album, Up Top the Storm, in December 2018. According to Carton, Up Top the Storm is meant to offer a cohesive maturity which sets it apart from previously released projects. Carton is quoted as saying, “Up Top is the first time that, as a songwriter, I intentionally sought to capitalize on the strengths of each band member. From musical overtures, to digitized synthetic pop and stripped ballads that reveal the vulnerability behind the words sung, this project has something to offer everyone.”

== Discography ==
- Overdue (2003)
- Some Things Change (2005)
- Hidden Deep in the Green (2007)
- Lucid Dreams (live album, 2012)
- Come Out From Where You Hide (2013)
- Up Top the Storm (2018)
