= 1931 Menshevik Trial =

1931 Soviet show-trial

The Menshevik Trial was one of the early purges carried out by Stalin in which 14 economists, who were former members of the Menshevik party, were put on trial and convicted for trying to re-establish their party as the "Union Bureau of the Mensheviks". It was held 1–8 March 1931 in the House of Unions. The presiding judge was Nikolay Shvernik.

== Defendants ==
The 14 defendants were:

- Boris Berlatsky
- Aleksandr Finn-Enotaevsky
- Abram Ginzburg
- Vladimir Groman
- Mikhail Yakubovich
- Vladimir Ikov
- Kirill Petunin
- Isaak Illich Rubin
- Vasili Sher
- Aron Sokolovsky
- Nikolai Sukhanov
- Moisei Teitelbaum
- Ivan Volkov
- Lazar Zalkind

The majority of the defendants were Russian. Six out of the fourteen defendants were Jews. It was suggested in Bundist circles that this large proportion of Jews among the accused had been specially arranged to organize feeling against the Jewish Socialists. This was denied by Stalin in his official statement to the JTA.

== The trial ==
The defendants were accused of setting up the "All-Union Bureau of Mensheviks." Vladimir Groman gave a public testimony that he and Vladimir Bazarov (who was not on trial) headed a counterrevolutionary group in Gosplan, purportedly organized in 1923, which attempted at "influencing the economic policy of the Soviet authorities so as to hold the position of 1923–25." Groman, being a member of the Presidium of the Gosplan the star figure among the accused, damned himself and his colleagues with testimony that at Gosplan they had spent their time

Putting into the control figures and into the surveys of current business planning ideas and deliberately distorted appraisals antagonistic to the general Party line (lowering the rates of expansion of socialist construction, distorting the class approach, exaggerating the difficulties), stressing the signs of an impending catastrophe (Groman) or, what is close to this, assigning a negligible chance of success to the Party line directed toward the socialist attack (Bazarov, Gukhman) ...

The indictment stated that the common goals of the three groups of the accused were the restoration of capitalism in the country by means of a coup, with the support of a foreign intervention and exploiting the connections with Western bourgeoisie and the II International. The main activities within the country were "wrecking" (economic sabotage) and disruptive work in the army.

== Final day ==
On the final day, the prisoners confessed to the allegations. "In the last minutes before my death", one of them was quoted saying, "I will think with disgust of the evil I have wrought; evil for which not we, but foreign Menshevists and the Second International must share responsibility."

Nikolai Krylenko, the Public Prosecutor, declared that Groman, Sher, Yakubovitch, Ginzburg, and Sukhanov were the principal leaders of the counter-revolutionary organization, and therefore, must suffer the death penalty. For the others he asked that they should be isolated "for long periods".

== Verdict ==
At 9 March 1931, after deliberating for twenty-five hours, the court sentenced seven defendants to ten years' imprisonment. The seven other defendants were sentenced to different terms of imprisonment, ranging from five to eight years. Those who received the ten years' sentence were Groman, Sher, Sukhanov, Ginzburg, Jakobovich, Petunina, and Finn-Enotaevsky.

== Reactions ==
Rafail Abramovich, a prominent Menshevik in exile in Berlin, helped to mobilise Western socialist and labour support for the persecuted economists. At a rally in Berlin, organised by the SPD, he denied there was an underground Menshevik organisation that existed in the Soviet Union. Leon Trotsky also commented on the trial, condemning both Stalin and the Mensheviks. However, Trotsky would later publicly regret these statements and his belief in the initial charges due to the previous ‘obstruction’ from Groman to the proposed five-year plan and industrialisation.

== See also ==
- List of show trials in the Soviet Union
- Case of the Union of Liberation of Belarus
