= Politisolator =

Soviet political prison type

Politizolators (Russian: политизолятор (singular); abbreviation for "political isolator") were special prisons in Soviet Russia and the Soviet Union to incarcerate political opponents of the Bolsheviks: Socialist-Revolutionaries, Mensheviks, Zionists, and anarchists, etc., as well as members of the Left Opposition within the Bolshevik Party itself.

== History ==
The first politisolator was established in 1921 by conversion of the Vladimir Central Prison.

Initially they were subordinated to GPU NKVD RSFSR, unlike other prisons, which were subordinated to ГУМЗ НКВД (State Directorate of the Places of Incarceration of NKVD). Under a separate subordination at that time was the infamous Solovki prison camp established in 1923, which also held political prisoners. Over time the subordination changed; these changes were poorly documented.

The NKVD Decree no. 00403 of November 11, 1935 signed by Genrikh Yagoda politisolators were renamed into NKVD special prisons (тюрьмы НКВД особого назначения). In 1937, Yagoda's successor Nikolay Yezhov, on the eve of Yezhovshchina, complained that "... politisolators, I may say without an exaggeration, resemble the forced recreation houses rather than prisons", that the incarcerated have a complete freedom of assembly to develop their anti-Soviet plots, etc. These lax conditions were related to the operation of various organizations aiding political prisoners, such as the Political Red Cross.

== Notable politisolators ==
- Vladimir Central Prison
- Suzdal PI, based on the prison of the Monastery of Saint Euthymius is Suzdal
- Verkhneuralsk PI, detailed in a two-volume monograph by Aleksey Yalovenko
- Yaroslavl PI (based on the Yaroslavl katorga transit prison (Ярославская Временно-каторжная тюрьма); now Korovniki detention center) in the village of Korovniki
- Chelyabinsk PI (Челябинский политизолятор), based on the Chelyabinsk transit prison
- Tobolsk PI (Тобольский политизолятор).
