= Fredy Perlman =

American author, translator, publisher, and activist (1934–1985)

- Born: August 20, 1934; Brno, Czechoslovakia
- Died: July 26, 1985 (aged 50); Detroit, Michigan, U.S.
- Education: Columbia University (MA); University of Belgrade (PhD)
- Occupations: Author, publisher and activist
- Known for: Against His-Story, Against Leviathan (1983)
- Spouse: Lorraine Nybakken (m. 1958)

Fredy Perlman (1934–1985) was an American author, translator, publisher, and activist. His best-known work, Against His-Story, Against Leviathan!, retells the historical rise of state domination (and domination generally) through a poetic investigation of the Hobbesian metaphor of the Leviathan. He also translated the first English version of The Society of the Spectacle, published in 1970.

== Early life ==
Perlman was born August 20, 1934, in Brno, Czechoslovakia, to Henry and Martha Perlman. His family immigrated first to Cochabamba, Bolivia to escape the Holocaust and later to the United States. Perlman received a master's degree from Columbia University and a PhD from University of Belgrade. He married Lorraine Nybakken in January 1958.

== Career ==
His best-known work, Against His-Story, Against Leviathan (1983) rewrites the history of humanity as a struggle of free people resisting being turned into "zeks" (a Soviet term for forced labour that Perlman borrowed from The Gulag Archipelago) by Leviathans (a term used by Thomas Hobbes for the sovereign nation-state). The book influenced the anarcho-primitivist author John Zerzan. Philosopher John P. Clark states that Against His-Story, Against Leviathan! describes Perlman's critique of what he saw as "the millennia-long history of the assault of the technological megamachine on humanity and the Earth." Clark also notes the book discusses "anarchistic spiritual movements" such as the Yellow Turban movement in ancient China and the Brethren of the Free Spirit in medieval Europe.

== Death ==
Perlman died on July 26, 1985, while undergoing heart surgery in Detroit's Henry Ford Hospital. He was survived by his wife and a brother.

== Selected publications ==
- Fredy Perlman (1962), Plunder, New York: Living Theatre
- "Essay on Commodity Fetishism". Telos 6 (Fall 1970). New York: Telos Press.
- Essays on Marx's Theory of Value
- "The Continuing Appeal of Nationalism"
  - Sound recording
- "The Reproduction of Daily Life"
- Against His-story! Against Leviathan!
- Worker-Student Action Committees, France May '68 with Roger Gregoire
- Manual for Revolutionary Leaders
- Manual for Revolutionary Leaders Second Edition Including The Sources of Velli's Thoughts (Black & Red, Detroit, 1974)
- "Ten Theses on the Proliferation of Egocrats"
- "Obituary for Paul Baran"
- "The Machine Against the Garden: Two Essays on American Literature and Culture"
- "Chicago, 1968"
- "Anything can happen"
- Illyria Street Commune 1979 (AudioPlay)
- Illyria Street Commune 1979 (Playscript on The Anarchist Library)

== See also ==
- Original Affluent Society
- Situationist International
- David Watson (anarchist)
- John Zerzan
