= List of show trials in the Soviet Union =

This is a list of major political and economic show trials in Soviet Russia and the Soviet Union.

For purposes of this list, a show trial (pokazatel'nyi protsess) is defined as a public trial for which the guilt or innocence of the defendant has been predetermined, and which was conducted as a spectacle intended to amplify both the allegation and the verdict for a broad audience, thereby serving as a warning against similar dissidence or transgression.

Show trials are a form of political trial orchestrated by the state and tend to be retributive rather than corrective. They are conducted for propaganda purposes, internal or international. The state may or may not have believed in the actual guilt of the defendants in any particular case; a particular defendant may or may not have been actually guilty of crime. Instead, the matter of central importance here is the predetermined result of the event and the form of its presentation.

== Background ==
The Bolshevik Revolution of 1917 marked a dramatic break with the form of government and its administration. The new "proletarian" state cast aside the old structure of law, with Decree No. 1, published December 7, 1917, formally abolishing the courts, procuracy, and bar associations of the old regime. In its place emerged a raw and simple new system based upon people's courts and revolutionary tribunals.

While the people's courts involved themselves with minor infractions and administered comparatively minor sanctions, the revolutionary tribunals were explicityly tools of political repression aimed at consolidating the power and authority of the new revolutionary order. These consisted of a judge and six "people's assessors" and, in the words of historian Peter Juviler, they "dispensed primitive, severe, sometimes arbitrary justice." While these sometimes took on the old form of the courtroom battle between accuser and defense attorneys, they often did not, with old laws and legal norms applied or not in accord with the "revolutionary concience and revolutionary concept of justice."

During the first months of Bolshevik rule in coalition with the Left Socialist-Revolutionaries, during which the People's Commissar of Justice was the Left SR Isaac Steinberg, there was institutional pushback within the new government tending towards the reestablishment of old legal codification and norms. This early tendency towards codification was set back dramatically after the Left SRs moved into opposition over the signing of the Treaty of Brest-Litovsk and the deepening of the Russian Civil War.

Parallel with these changes to the legal system was a transformation of the institutions of investigation and interrogation of political and economic crime. The Provisional Government installed by th February Revolution had eliminated the old secret police system that had been a pillar of the tsarist autocracy. On December 20, 1917 the Bolsheviks reversed this reform with the establishment of the Extraordinary Commission for Combatting Counterrevolution and Sabotage, commonly known as Cheka — the sound of the Russian initials for Extraordinary Commission, "Che" + "Ka." This new secret police apparatus was headed by Felix Dzerzhinsky, a hardline ethnic Polish revolutionary extremist who had himself suffered arrest, prison, and exile at the hands of the Okhrana, tsarism's political police.

The Cheka served a dual investigative and punitive function during the early Soviet period and was largely autonomous and a law unto themselves. The organization used extreme measures in pursuit of its goals of protecting the new regime, including arbitrary arrest, the taking and shooting of hostages, the use of torture to extract information and confession, and the administration of summary executions. Oversignt, nominally in the hands of local prosecutors, proved grossly inadequate.

Although not formally granted the power of capital punishment until September 17, 1918, as early as February 1918 the Cheka declared there was "no other way to combat counterrevolutionaries, spies, speculators, burglars, hooligans, saboteurs, and other parasites than their merciless annihilation at the scene of the crime." This arbitrary and frequently abused position of independent power grew within the Communist Party throughout 1918 and 1919, culminating in a decree abolishing the Cheka's right to execute prisoners on January 20, 1920, but the Cheka and its institutional secret police successors retained a vast, largely unsupervised, power to obtain information and confession by whatever coercive means it deemed necessary — an essential component in constructing elaborate show trial cases over ensuing decades.

== Early Soviet period ==
=== Malinovsky Trial (Moscow, 1918) ===
Roman Malinovsky, a former metalworker in St. Petersburg, was one of six Bolshevik members of the 4th Duma of Imperial Russia, to which he was elected in November 1912. He was first denounced as a secret informer to the tsarist secret police, the Okhrana, by Menshevik leader Iulii Martov in January 1913, but was subsequently defended by Bolshevik leader Vladimir Ul'ianov (Lenin) for years afterwards, despite a steady rumbling of his actual allegiance, with a special party investigating committee officially clearing him of charges in 1914.

Roman Malinovsky in 1913.

Following the February Revolution of 1917 which overthrew the tsarist regime, secret police offices in Moscow and Petrograd (St. Petersburg) were raided by revolutionary crowds and documents began to be assembled identifying agents provocateur and informants. No documents were found upon which to make a case against Malinovsky, however, although in the environment of discovery and retribution, the drumbeat against Malinovsky again began to be heard, with organs of the Menshevik press particularly adament that there was truth to the long-running rumors, with a 5-part series on "The Malinovsky Affair" running in Rabochaia gazeta.

Malinovsky, from a German prisoner-of-war camp, sought to return to Russia to clear his name. With the Bolsheviks in power after the October Revolution of 1917 that overthrew the Russian Provisional Government and the democratically-elected Russian Constituent Assembly, Malinovsky was released from captivity following the signing of the Treaty of Brest-Litovsk in March 1918 and made an appeal for a new hearing directly to Lenin, who had until fairly recently continued to believe in Malinovsky's innocence.

Malinovsky returned to Petrograd in October 1918, surrendering at the Smolny Institute on the 23rd of that month. He was subsequently transferred to Moscow, where he underwent 9 days of interrogation.

His trial was held on November 5, 1918, before the High Revolutionary Tribunal of the All-Russian Central Executive Committee of Soviets (VTsIK), with Nikolai Krylenko, a former employee of Malinovsky until his arrest in December 1913, one of the team of prosecutors. Malinovsky's sole defense was a six-hour speech in his own behalf in which he did not deny the charges against him, but claimed that police blackmail was the reason for his duplicity and argued that little actual damage was done by the information he provided.

Malinovsky expressed repentance for his activity, while stating that he expected to receive the death penalty for his crimes. He was convicted, sentenced to death, and executed that same day.

=== Sultan-Galiev Trial (Moscow, 1923) ===
This relates to the trial of Mirsaid Sultan-Galiev for pro-Turkish "national deviation" and marked the first show trial of any Communist.

=== Krasnoshchekov Trial [Prombank] (Moscow, 1924) ===
This refers to the demonstration trial of Alexander Krasnoshchëkov, the head of the State Bank, and five others on charges of corruption and embezelment. Krasnoshchëkov was arrested in September 1923 and held in Lefortovo Prison in Moscow for interrogation, pending the show trial held in the spring of 1924.

=== Boris Savinkov Trial (Moscow, 1924) ===
Most Soviet show trials featured book-length transcipts of their proceedings. Title page from the 1924 Savinkov trial, published by the People's Commissariat of Internal Affairs.

== Early Stalin period ==
=== The Shakhty Affair (Moscow, 1928) ===
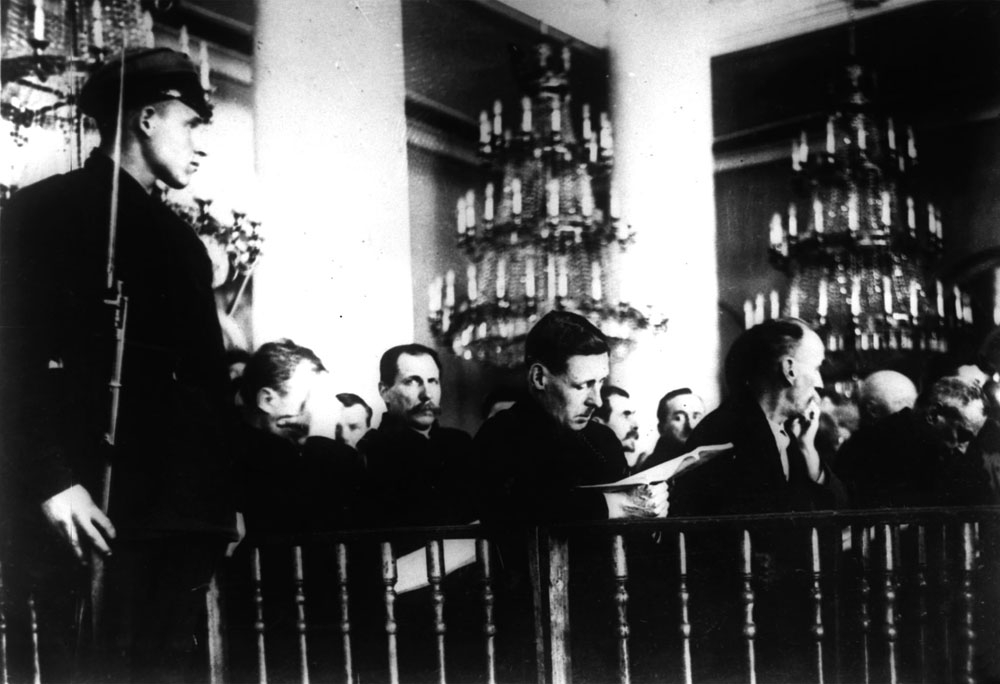
Defendants at the 1928 Shakhty show trial.

== See also ==
- Case of the Union of Liberation of Belarus
- Moscow trials (1936–1938)
