= Miloš Samardžija =

Yugoslav economist

Miloš Samardžija (born 24 August 1920) is a Yugoslav economist. He was born in Klokočevac.

He attended the School of Law in Belgrade and graduated in 1947. He remained there while he studied for his PhD degree, which he gained in 1956 and was promptly promoted to full Professor (1956). In this capacity he taught both political economy and the specifics of the Yugoslav economic system.

From 1951 to 1953 he worked at the embassy of the Socialist Federal Republic of Yugoslavia in Paris.

He was a member of the Economic Council of the Federal Executive Council and the Chairman of the Economic Council of the Serbian Assembly, director of the Institute of Economic Investments and adviser at the United Nations Economic Commission for Europe based in Geneva.

He was a prolific writer, contributing to the study of theoretical problem concerning value and prices and the economic system in relation of economic planning and the market in a socialist economy.
