= Minus six (exile) =

The minus six (Russian: Минус шесть, romanized: minus shest') was a form of exile imposed in the Soviet Union during the 1920s, which banned the subject from living in or visiting any of the union's six largest cities as well as border territories.

== Cities banned ==
- Moscow (now in Russia)
- Petrograd (known as Leningrad from 1924, now Saint Petersburg in Russia)
- Kiev (now Kyiv in Ukraine)
- Kharkov (now Kharkiv in Ukraine)
- Yekaterinburg (known as Sverdlovsk from 1924, now Yekaterinburg in Russia)
- Tiflis (now Tbilisi in Georgia)
