= Union of Cities =

Political organisation set up in Imperial Russia

All-Russian Union of Cities Helping Ill and Wounded Soldiers
- Всероссийский союз городов помощи больным и раненым воинам
- Formation: 22 August 1914; 112 years ago
- Founder: Moscow City Duma
- Dissolved: 17 January 1918; 108 years ago
- Region served: Russia
- Parent organization: Zemgor

The All-Russian Union of Cities (Russian: Всероссийский союз городов, romanized: Vserossiysky soyuz gorodov) was a political organisation set up in Imperial Russia in August 1914 to help achieve Russian war aims. It was a liberal organisation which after 1915 operated in conjunction with the All-Russian Zemstvo Union. The Kadet politician, Nikolai Kishkin, was the deputy chief representative.

== Ukraine ==
The Union of Cities of the Southwestern Front was based in Ukraine and was led by Teodor Shteingel. It employed Mykola Biliashivsky, Dmytro Doroshenko, Ivan Kraskovsky, Volodymyr Leontovych, Fedir Matushevskyi, Andrii Nikovskyi, Volodymyr Ulianytskyi and Andrii Viazlov.
