= Abdisho bar Berika =

Church of the East bishop (died 1318)

Abdisho bar Berika or Ebedjesu (Classical Syriac: ܥܒܕܝܫܘܥ ܕܨܘܒܐ) (died 1318), also known as Mar Odisho or St. Odisho in English, was a Syriac writer.

According to some scholars, Abdisho was born in Nusaybin and became a monk in the monastery of Mar Aḥa and Mar John – however, this might be a confusion with Abdisho IV Maron. Abdisho bar Berika became bishop of Shiggar (Sinjar) and the province of Bet 'Arbaye (Arbayestan) and later metropolitan of Nisibis and Armenia. For these offices, dates are given in parts of the literature (bishop of Sinjar in 1285, metropolitan of Nisibis in 1291), but these are likely based on ambiguous contemporary sources and are therefore unreliable.

He was the author of the Marganitha (The Book of the Jewel), one of the most important ecclesiastical texts of the Assyrian Church of the East, a kind of theological encyclopaedia.

He wrote biblical commentaries in Syriac, as well as polemical treatises against heresy and dogmatic and legal writings. His legal works are the Nomokanon, which is largely based on the predecessor by Gabriel of Basra, and the Regulation of Ecclesiastical Judgements and Laws (often cited with a Latin translation of the title, as ordo iudiciorum ecclesiasticorum). He also wrote texts in metrical form including an author catalogue, which played an important role in Syrian literary history.

== Translations ==
- The Catalogue of Books of ʿAbdishoʿ bar Brikha: Translated with an Introduction and Notes. Translated by Stadel, Seth. Brill. 2025.

== List of works ==
- The "book of the jewel" or Marganitha (1298)
- Catalogue of biblical and ecclesiastical books.
- Paradise of Eden.

== Bibliography ==
- Kaufhold, Hubert (2019). Ebedjesus von Nisibis, „Ordo iudiciorum ecclesiasticorum“. Eine Zusammenstellung der kirchlichen Rechtsbestimmungen der ostsyrischen Kirche im 14. Jahrhundert [Abdisho of Nisibis, "Ordo iudiciorum ecclesiasticorum". A compilation of the ecclesiastical legal regulations of the East Syrian Church in the 14th century]. Wiesbaden: Harrassowitz. ISBN 978-3-447-11294-9.
- Benjamin, Yoab (1994). "A comparative Study of ‛Abdīshō's Paradise of Eden and the Maḳāmāt of al-Ḥarīrī". Journal of the Assyrian Academic Society. 8 (1). Assyrian Academic Society: 51–82.
