= Alfons Bürge =

German legal historian and author

Alfons Bürge is a Swiss scholar of Ancient Law, with a special interest in the comparative study of Ancient and Modern Law.

Born in Winterthur, Switzerland, in 1947, Bürge studied the Classics at the University of Zurich. He received his Ph.D. in Classics from the University of Zurich in 1972 with a dissertation on the defense speech Pro Murena by Cicero (directed by Professor Heinz Haffter). His work on Cicero led him to scholarly interest in Roman law, and so he went on to study under Professor Max Kaser at the University of Salzburg and then he completed a doctorate at the University of Zurich in 1979 with a dissertation on Retentio in Roman law (directed by Professor Hans Peter). With the support of a fellowship from the Swiss National Science Foundation, he researched the development of French private law in the 19th century in Paris and at the Max Planck Institute for Comparative and International Private Law in Hamburg. From 1985 to 1988, he was post-doctoral assistant and academic advisor at the Leopold Wenger Institute for Ancient Legal History and Papyrus Research at LMU Munich. In 1987, Bürge received his Habilitation at the University of Salzburg under Professor Theo Mayer-Maly with a work on 19th century French private law.

From 1993 to 1999, he was Professor of Civil Law and Roman Law at Saarland University. In 1999, Bürge accepted a call as Professor of Law and Director of the Leopold Wenger Institute for Ancient Legal History and Papyrus Research at LMU Munich as the successor of Dieter Nörr. From 2009 to 2011, Bürge served as Dean of the Juristic Faculty at LMU Munich.

Bürge was elected a member of the Bavarian Academy of Sciences in 2004. In 2011 he was awarded an honorary doctorate from the University of Vienna. He received emeritus status at LMU Munich in 2013.

In 2017, Ulrike Babusiaux, Peter Nobel, and Johannes Platschek edited a Festschrift entitled Der Buerge einst und jetzt (Zurich: Schulthess, 2017), in his honor.

== Selected publications ==
- Die Juristenkomik in Ciceros Rede Pro Murena: Übersetzung und Kommentar (Zürich: Juris, 1974)
- Retentio im römischen Sachen- und Obligationenrecht (= Zürcher Studien zur Rechtsgeschichte. Bd. 3) (Zürich: Schulthess, 1979)
- Rechtsdogmatik und Wirtschaft: Das richterliche Moderationsrecht beim sittenwidrigen Rechtsgeschäft im Rechtsvergleich. Bundesrepublik Deutschland – Schweiz – Österreich – Frankreich (= Schriften zum Bürgerlichen Recht. Bd. 102) (Berlin: Duncker & Humblot, 1987)
- Das französische Privatrecht im 19. Jahrhundert: Zwischen Tradition und Pandektenwissenschaft, Liberalismus und Etatismus (= Studien zur europäischen Rechtsgeschichte. Bd. 52) (Frankfurt: Klostermann, 1991)
- Römisches Privatrecht: Rechtsdenken und gesellschaftliche Verankerung. Eine Einführung (Darmstadt: Wissenschaftliche Buchgesellschaft, 1999)
