= Sumera Studies =

Pseudohistorical movement in Imperial Japan

Sumera Studies was a pseudohistorical movement in Imperial Japan, led by Akira Nakakoji and Takehiko Kojima. Military personnel and bureaucrats were also involved, making it a half-bureaucratic pseudo-historical movement.

== Overview ==
Keigo Harada, who pioneered ancient Orient studies in Japan and founded the Babylonian Society in 1916 discovered many similarities with the Japanese people in appearance, religion, customs, and language of the Babylonian peoples while studying the Code of Hammurabi. He proposed the hypothesis that a segment of the Babylonian population migrated to Japan in the past. After the activities of the Babylonian Society ceased due to the Great Kanto Earthquake. In 1927, Atsuo Mishima, the chief priest of Oyamatsumi Shrine, inherited and developed Harada's theory, tracing the origins of the Japanese people to the Sumerian region of Mesopotamia (then called 'Smeru'). From just before World War II through wartime, popular beliefs such as "Takamagahara was in Babylonia" and that the old term for the emperor, "Sumeramikoto," was "Sumeramikoto," meaning "Sumeru no koto" were rampant. For this reason, Kyoto University's Yomokuro Nakahara, a leading authority on Sumerian studies in Japan, (Note: 中原は、日本におけるシュメール研究の基礎を築いた。実証性を欠いた従来の研究動向を批判し、同時代資料の実証的分析によってシュメール王権の展開過程を明らかにした。The Sumerian Tablets in the Imperial University of Kyoto. Tokyo.1928を出版。戦後京都大学でシュメール学を担う後進の育成に努めた前田t23ページ。）) inserted a macron to transcribe it as "Shumēru" (シュメール) to replace the previous transcriptions "Sumeru" (スメル) or "Shumeru" (シュメル) in order to avoid confusion. This is the origin of the current convention of writing "Shumēru" (シュメール) in Japan.

Among those who were devoted to this 'Japanese Sumerian Origin Theory' was Akira Nakakoji, a renowned philosopher, nationalist thinker, and opinion leader. Afterwards, Nakakoji transformed the originally popular theory of Japanese Sumerian origins, which sought the origins of Japanese people and the imperial family in the Middle East, into the Sumerian Studies movement, which was based on nationalism and imperial historical views. and developed it as such.

In 1940, at the suggestion of Nakakoji, fellow philosopher Takehiko Kojima, and army officer Tatsuhiko Takashima, the 'Sumera School' was established, with Admiral Nobumasa Suetsugu appointed as head of the school. instructors such as Yoshikazuo Okumura, Hiroichiro Ishihara, Hiroshi Oshima, Toshio Shiratori, Hideo Hiraide, and Kumao Maruyama participated.Setsuko Hara's brother-in-law, film director Hisatora Kumagai, also joined the Sumera School and formed the theater troupe Taiyoza within the school. Additionally, influenced by his philosophy, Shiro Kawazoe (cousin of Takehiko Kojima, later owner of the Italian restaurant 'Chianti') In 1942, Sumera Academy established the Japan World Cultural Restoration Foundation as a foundation. General Kazunari Ugaki became chairman, and Aiichiro Fujiyama, chairman of the Japan Chamber of Commerce and Industry, became vice president. The Japan World Cultural Renaissance Association exerted influence in wartime Japanese society, such as hosting the Asia-Reconstruction Leonardo da Vinci Exhibition in 1942, held in Ueno in Tokyo as a friendship project with the support of the Italian Embassy in Japan. The thought developed by the Sumera Academy asserted ethnocentrism, combining the aforementioned 'Japanese Sumerian origin theory' with the imperial historical perspective, the theory of Japanese and Jewish ancestry, Jewish conspiracy theories, and the Mu Continent theory, and the military-led fascismIn addition to supporting the movement with pseudo-histories and conspiracy theories, he was involved in publishing the 'Nazi Series,' a Japanese translation of books published by the Nazis in Germany, and establishing the Institute of War Culture, thus playing a role in Japanese political thought during wartime.

Nakakoji believed that in the previous era, there was the 'Sumera Pacific Sphere' centered on Japan, and that the ongoing Pacific War was considered the 'Imperial Army for the Reconstruction of the Former Sumera Pacific Sphere.' On the other hand, Sakakura's father-in-law, Isaku Nishimura, said, "(The group called Sumera, which Sakakura and others are involved with) claims that the Sumera, the fundamental race of humanity, migrated to Japan and became the lives of the Japanese Emperor, but they are a kind of megalomaniac. Sakakura won this war, took all of Australia, built a villa to visit, or flew to Paris to shop, I was fantasizing about things like that." He left this note. Yojūrō Yasuda also regarded sumera-gaku as a branch of the Kyoto school and criticized it from the standpoint of traditional kokugaku as a type of heretical cult based on the theory of ongi theory

Although the name Sumerology is derived from Sumer, the leading figures were nationalist philosophers, while its supporters were military personnel and the Tripartite Pact between Japan and GermanyAs can be seen from the fact that he was a cultural figure who cooperated with diplomats and the military who were active in the treaty, his interests and purpose were not to study the actual reality of Sumerian civilization, but to construct a historical perspective based on pseudo-history under wartime, claiming that the Yamato people, descendants of the Sumerian people—the root race of human civilization—once ruled the world and have reason to rule it again. It aimed to justify an alliance with Nazi Germany by attacking Jews, who were also considered Sumerian and a marginal branch, based on anti-Semitism.

Furthermore, Sumera Academy was involved in Japanese military operations in the southern occupied territories, such as dispatching personnel.

After the defeat of Japan in WWII, Sumera studies, which had been based on ethnic supremacy, vanished, and empirical studies of ancient Sumer in Japan began by Yomokuro Nakahara and others, the godfather of the term 'Sumer.'
