= Wolfgang Kunkel =

German legal historian

Wolfgang Kunkel (1902–1981) was a prominent German historian of Roman law, who stressed the importance of Roman social history in understanding Roman law and institutions.

Born in Fürth, Hesse in Germany, Kunkel studied law and history at Goethe University Frankfurt, the University of Giessen, and the Friedrich Wilhelm University of Berlin. He received his doctorate in 1924 at the University of Freiburg and his Habilitation in 1926 (both were directed by Professor Ernst Levy). In 1929, Kunkel accepted a position as Professor at the University of Göttingen. There he worked with the prominent classical scholars Eduard Fraenkel, Hermann Frankel, and Kurt Latte. When those scholars were ousted from their positions by the Nazi government because they were Jewish, Kunkel protested. In 1936, Kunkel accepted a position at the University of Bonn and in 1943 at Heidelberg University. During World War II, he served as a judge in the German Army, where he followed his own ethical principles and was able to prevent several injustices. After the end of the war, he took up his position at Heidelberg University and then was appointed Rector of Heidelberg University in 1947/1948. He moved to the Ludwig-Maximilians-Universität München in 1956 and renamed the Institute for Papyrus Research and Ancient Legal History the Leopold Wenger Institute for Ancient Legal History and Papyrus Research in honor of the Austrian historian of Roman law Leopold Wenger (also an anti-Nazi).

Kunkel was a prolific and influential scholar. Throughout his career, he wrote, edited, or co-edited eleven books and also authored over 60 articles. His most influential books were Römische Rechtsgeschichte (originally published in 1948, and then went through seven editions (and which was translated into Dutch, English, Spanish, and Italian) and his Herkunft und soziale Stellung der römischen Juristen (originally published in Weimar in 1952, 2nd corrected and expanded edition published in Graz in 1967).

Many of Kunkel's students would go on to be leaders in the field of the study of Roman law. After his retirement in 1970, his former student Dieter Nörr succeeded him as director of the Leopold Wenger Institute for Ancient Legal History and Papyrus Research.
