= Johannes Platschek =

German legal scholar (born 1973)

- Born: 1973 (age 52–53); Munich, Germany
- Education: LMU Munich
- Occupation: Legal scholar
- Known for: Research on Roman law and ancient legal history

Johannes Platschek (born 1973 in Munich, Germany) is a German legal scholar. His research interests include Hellenistic Legal History, Roman Civil Procedure, ancient civil law appearing in non-legal sources, and the textual criticism of the Roman jurists writings (Gaius, Justinian's Digest).

In 1993, he began his legal studies at LMU Munich. He passed his first state legal examination in 1998; his second state legal examination in 2000, and in 2003 he finished his doctorate, summa cum laude, with a dissertation on Cicero's Pro Quinctio under the direction of Professor Dr. Dieter Nörr. Starting in 2004, he worked as a postdoctoral assistant at LMU Munich's Leopold Wenger Institute for Ancient Legal History and Papyrus Research, where he finished his Habilitation ('Das Edikt De pecunia constituta') in 2009 (in Roman Law, Civil Law, Ancient Legal History, and the history of private law in modern times).

In September 2009, Platschek became Professor of Roman Law, Civil Law, and Modern Private Law at the University of Göttingen. After a short-term lecturer position at the German-Chinese legal institute at Nanjing University in September 2011, he became a lecturer at the Scuola di Scienze giuridiche Dottorato at the University of Milano-Bicocca in December 2011. In February 2012, he was hired as a university professor of Roman Law, the Romanistic foundations of modern rights, and Ancient Legal History at the University of Vienna, Austria. In 2015, he became Professor of Roman Law, Ancient Legal History, and Civil law, and also assumed the position of Director of the Leopold Wenger Institute for Ancient Legal History and Papyrus Research, at LMU Munich as the successor to Prof. Dr. Alfons Bürge. In February 2019, he organized a conference in memory of the late Professor Dr. Dieter Nörr.

== Writings (selected) ==
- Das ius Verrinum im Fall des Heraclius von Syrakus. In: Zeitschrift der Savigny-Stiftung für Rechtsgeschichte: Romanistische Abteilung. Band 118 (2001), S. 234–263
- Studien zu Ciceros Rede für P. Quinctius. Munich, 2005 (Dissertation)
- Augsburger Inschriften und römische Wirtschaftsorganisation. Römischrechtliche (und andere) Assoziationen im Römischen Museum Augsburg. In: Christoph Becker and Hans G. Herrmann, eds.: Ökonomie und Recht – Historische Entwicklungen in Bayern. Münster, 2009, S. 1–19
- Das Edikt De pecunia constituta. Die römische Erfüllungszusage und ihre Einbettung in den hellenistischen Kreditverkehr. Munich, 2013 (Habilitationsschrift)
- Der Bürge einst und jetzt: Festschrift für Alfons Bürge (co-edited with Ulrike Babusiaux and Peter Nobel). Zurich, 2017
