= Dieter Nörr =

German scholar

Dieter Nörr (1931 in Munich, Germany – October 3, 2017) was a German scholar of Ancient Law. He studied at the Ludwig-Maximilians-Universität München from 1949 to 1953. After receiving his doctorate with a dissertation on criminal law in the Code of Hammurabi (directed by Professor Mariano San Nicolò), Nörr undertook postdoctoral study at Heidelberg University and the University of Rome. He worked for a year as a post-doctoral assistant at the Institute for Criminal Law and Legal Philosophy under Karl Engisch. He received his Habilitation at the Ludwig-Maximilians-Universität München, under Professor Wolfgang Kunkel, in 1959 with a work on Byzantine Contract Law and was promoted to Privatdozent. He then accepted the Chair of Roman and Civil Law at the University of Hamburg. In 1960, Nörr became Full Professor at the University of Münster. After he declined positions at the University of Hamburg, the University of Tübingen, and Bielefeld University, he returned to the Ludwig-Maximilians-Universität München (LMU) as Professor, Chair of Roman Law, and Director of the Leopold Wenger Institute for Ancient Legal History and Papyrus Research (and he received emeritus status in 1999). His brother, Knut Wolfgang Nörr, was also a professor of Legal History, especially Canon Law, at the University of Tübingen.

As director of the Leopold Wenger Institute, for decades he led the famous Wednesday evening seminar where undergraduates would give presentations on passages from ancient law and from the Roman jurists. Many of his doctoral students went on to become professors of ancient law at a number of universities (in Germany and elsewhere, including Hans-Dieter Spengler at the University of Erlangen–Nuremberg, Tiziana Chiusi at Saarland University, Wolfgang Kaiser at the University of Freiburg, and Johannes Platschek at LMU Munich). Professor Nörr also generously hosted many foreign guest researchers in the Leopold Wenger Institute.

Dieter Nörr's research focus was Roman law and legal philosophy. Professor Nörr was also co-editor of the Zeitschrift der Savigny-Stiftung für Rechtsgeschichte (Romanistische Abteilung), the leading scholarly journal for Roman law from 1972 to 2001.

== Publications (selected) ==
• Studien zum Strafrecht im Kodex Hammurabi. Dissertation, Ludwig-Maximilians-Universität München, 1955.

• Die Fahrlässigkeit im byzantinischen Vertragsrecht. Munich: C. H. Beck, 1960 (Habilitationsschrift, Ludwig-Maximilians-Universität München, 1958/59).

• Imperium und Polis in der hohen Prinzipatszeit. Munich: C. H. Beck, 1966. 2nd revised edition: 1969.

• Die Entstehung der longi temporis praescriptio. Studien zum Einfluss der Zeit im Recht und zur Rechtspolitik in der Kaiserzeit. Köln/Opladen: Westdeutscher Verlag, 1969.

• Divisio und Partitio. Bemerkungen zur römischen Rechtsquellenlehre und zur antiken Wissenschaftstheorie. Berlin: Schweitzer, 1972, ISBN 3-8059-0243-3.

• Rechtskritik in der römischen Antike. Munich: Verlag der Bayerischen Akademie der Wissenschaften, 1974, ISBN 3-7696-0072-X.

• Causa mortis. Auf den Spuren einer Redewendung. Munich: C.H. Beck, 1986, ISBN 3-406-31232-2.

• Aspekte des römischen Völkerrechts. Die Bronzetafel von Alcántara, vorgetragen am 4. Juli 1986 vor der Bayerischen Akademie der Wissenschaften. Munich: Philosophisch-Historische Klasse, 1989, ISBN 3-7696-0096-7.

• Die Fides im römischen Völkerrecht. Heidelberg: Müller, 1991, ISBN 3-7696-1632-4.

• Savignys philosophische Lehrjahre. Ein Versuch. Frankfurt am Main: Klostermann, 1994, ISBN 3-465-02637-3.

• Historiae iuris antiqui. Gesammelte Schriften. 3 Bände. Edited by Tiziana J. Chiusi, Wolfgang Kaiser, and Hans-Dieter Spengler. Goldbach bei Aschaffenburg: Keip, 2003, ISBN 3-8051-0931-8.

• Römisches Recht: Geschichte und Geschichten. Der Fall Arescusa et alii (Dig. 19,1,43 sq.). Munich: Verlag der Bayerischen Akademie der Wissenschaften, 2005, ISBN 3-7696-1632-4.

• Schriften 2001–2010: Anläßlich seines 80. Geburtstags. Edited by Tiziana J. Chiusi and Hans-Dieter Spengler. Madrid: Marcial Pons, 2012, ISBN 978-84-9768-925-0
