= Leopold Wenger =

Austrian legal historian (1874–1953)

Leopold Wenger (4 September 1874 – 21 September 1953) was a prominent Austrian historian of ancient law. He fostered interdisciplinary study of the ancient world (including law, literature, papyri, and inscriptions).

== Biography ==
Wenger was born in his maternal grandparents' castle Trabuschgen in Obervellach (Austria) in 1874. He discovered a love for the study of Latin and Ancient Greek in secondary school. He went on to study law at the University of Graz, where he became interested in ancient law. After completing his doctorate in 1897, he continued his studies at Leipzig University under Ludwig Mitteis. He then returned to the University of Graz to write his Habilitation.

In 1902, he became associate professor at the University of Graz. He went on to teach at the University of Vienna, University of Graz, Heidelberg University, and Ludwig-Maximilians-Universität München. In 1935, he left Munich (and Nazi Germany) to return to the University of Vienna (where he retired early three years later). In 1936, Wenger traveled to the United States where he spoke before the Riccobono Seminar. As devoted Roman Catholic and humanist, he was at odds with the Nazi regime first in Germany and then, after the Anschluss, in Austria, where he withdrew to his castle in Obervellach during World War II.

== Contributions ==
At the Ludwig-Maximilians-Universität München, he founded the Seminar for Papyrus Research. In 1915 he also established the monograph series entitled Münchener Beiträge zur Papyrusforschung (“Munich Contributions to Papyrus Research”) and in 1922 expanded the remit of the series to Münchener Beiträge zur Papyrusforschung und Antiken Rechstgeschichte ("Munich Contributions to Papyrus Research and Ancient Legal History”) which now has over 100 volumes.

In 1953, shortly before he died, Wenger also published his most well-known book Die Quellen des römischen Rechts (The Sources of Roman Law). Wenger had intended to write "a history of the whole legal order of the Romans that would comprise the total of public, procedural, and private institutions in one great unit; however, he completed only this one volume of the massive project he had envisioned. Throughout his career, he wrote, edited, or co-edited thirty books and also authored 88 articles.

== Recognition ==
Wenger received honorary doctorates from Harvard University and the University of Vienna and was a member of the Bavarian Academy of Science and the Prussian Academy of Science.

The legal history division of the law school of the Ludwig-Maximilians-Universität München was renamed the Leopold Wenger Institute for Ancient Legal History and Papyrus Research in his honor in 1956, under the direction of Wolfgang Kunkel (and Wenger's large library became the core of that institute's collections).
