= Hubert Kaufhold =

German judge

- Born: March 19, 1943 (age 83); Braunschweig, Germany
- Education: LMU Munich
- Occupations: Legal scholar; judge; academic
- Known for: Legal history of the Christian Orient, Syriac studies
- Awards: Bavarian Academy of Sciences Academy Award (2011); Order of St. Ephrem (2013); Audomar Scheuermann Study Prize (2015)

Hubert Kaufhold (born March 19, 1943, in Braunschweig, Germany) is a German legal scholar and judge, with special research interests in the languages and legal history of the Christian Orient.

== Education ==
Kaufhold studied law (1962–1966) at the University of Münster, LMU Munich, and the University of Göttingen from 1962 to 1966. After passing his first state examination as a lawyer, he continued his study of the Philology of the Christian Orient, Semitic Studies, and Judaism at the University of Göttingen and LMU Munich from 1966 to 1969. From 1969 to 1970, he was a research assistant at the Leopold Wenger Institute for Ancient Legal History and Papyrus Research at LMU Munich. In 1970, he received his Dr. phil. degree in the Philology of the Christian Orient from LMU Munich with a dissertation on the Law Book of the Nestorian Catholicos Yoḥannan bar Abgare which he went on to publish in 1971 as Syrische Texte zum islamischen Recht. Das dem nestorianischen Katholikos Johannes V. bar Aḇgārē zugeschriebene Rechtsbuch (= Abhandlungen der Bayerischen Akademie der Wissenschaften, phil.-hist. Klasse, NF, Volume 74).

== Career ==
From 1970 to 1973, he was scholarly assistant at LMU Munich. After completing the Dr. iuris degree in 1973 (with a dissertation on the legal collection of Gabriel, the 9th-century Nestorian metropolitan of Baṣra), and passing his second state examination as a lawyer in that year also, Kaufhold served as a public prosecutor and judge in Munich from 1973 to 2008. Since 1977, he has regularly taught Syriac and the legal history of the Christian Orient at the Leopold Wenger Institute for Ancient Legal History and Papyrus Research, where he held the title of Honorary Professor since 1986.

Since 1979, Kaufhold has been an editor of the journal Oriens Christianus and since 1996, he has been a member of the editorial board of the electronic magazine Hugoye: Journal of Syriac Studies. Starting 1999, he has been a member of the board of directors of the Görres Society in Jerusalem. From 1997 to 2015, he was a member of the Commission for the Editing of the Corpus of Greek Documents of the Middle Ages and Modern Times (since 2010: the Commission for Greek and Byzantine Studies) of the Bavarian Academy of Sciences. He undertook additional study in canon law (2007–2010) at the Klaus Mörsdorf Study Program in Canon Law (Das Klaus-Mörsdorf-Studium für Kanonistik) at LMU Munich and was awarded a licentiate of canon law (Lic. Iur. Can.) in 2013. Since 2008 he has been a member of the Christian Orient Research Center at the Catholic University of Eichstätt-Ingolstadt.

Since 1992 he has been a corresponding member of the Austrian Academy of Sciences (philosophical-historical class). The Bavarian Academy of Sciences awarded him the Academy Award in 2011. The Syrian Orthodox Patriarch Ignatius Zakka I. Iwas awarded him the St. Ephräm Order in 2013. The Archdiocese of Munich and Freising awarded him the Audomar Scheuermann Study Prize in 2015. Since 2017 he has been a member of the Accademia Ambrosiana in Milan.

Kaufhold is the author or editor of 11 books, 75 scholarly articles, and over 170 book reviews.

== Selected publications ==
- Hubert Kaufhold, Syrische Texte zum islamischen Recht. Das dem nestorianischen Katholikos Johannes V. bar Aḇgārē zugeschriebene Rechtsbuch (= Abhandlungen der Bayerischen Akademie der Wissenschaften, phil.-hist. Klasse, NF, Volume 74). Munich: Bavarian Academy of Sciences, 1971.
- Hubert Kaufhold, Die Rechtssammlung des Gabriel von Baṣra und ihr Verhältnis zu den anderen juristischen Sammelwerken der Nestorianer (= Münchener Universitätsschriften – Juristische Fakultät, Abhandlungen zur rechtswissen-schaftlichen Grundlagenforschung. Band 21). Berlin: Schweitzer, 1976.
- Hubert Kaufhold, Syrische Handschriften juristischen Inhalts in südindischen Bibliotheken (= Veröffentlichungen der Kommission für Antike Rechtsgeschichte. Nummer 5) (= Österreichische Akademie der Wissenschaften. Philosophisch-Historische Klasse. Sitzungsberichte 535) . Vienna: Austrian Academy of Sciences, 1989.
- Hubert Kaufhold, with Ludwig Burgmann, eds., Bibliographie zur Rezeption des byzantinischen Rechts im alten Rußland sowie zur Geschichte des armenischen und georgischen Rechts (= Forschungen zur byzantinischen Rechtsgeschichte. Volume 18). Frankfurt am Main: Löwenklau-Gesellschaft, 1992.
- Hubert Kaufhold, ed., Die armenischen Übersetzungen byzantinischer Rechtsbücher. Erster Teil: Allgemeines. Zweiter Teil: Die „Kurze Sammlung“ (= Forschungen zur byzantinischen Rechtsgeschichte. Volume 21). Frankfurt am Main: Löwenklau-Gesellschaft, 1997.
- Hubert Kaufhold, with Walter Selb, eds., Das Syrisch-römische Rechtsbuch (= Veröffentlichungen der Kommission für Antike Rechtsgeschichte. Number 9) (=Österreichische Akademie der Wissenschaften. Philosophisch-Historische Klasse. Denkschrift 295). Vienna: Austrian Academy of Sciences, 2002.
- Hubert Kaufhold, Christlicher Orient und schwäbische Heimat. Leben und Werk von Prälat Professor Dr. theol. Dr. phil. Georg Graf (15. März 1875 – 18. September 1955). Katalog der Ausstellung im Rathaus Dillingen a. d. Donau anläßlich der Gedenkveranstaltungen zum fünfzigsten Todestag Georg Grafs am 17. und 18. September in Dillingen. Würzburg: Ergon-Verlag, 2005.
- Hubert Kaufhold, ed., Georg Graf: Christlicher Orient und schwäbische Heimat. Kleine Schriften. Anläßlich des 50. Todestages des Verfassers (= Beiruter Texte und Studien. Volume 107). Würzburg: Ergon-Verlag, 2005.
- Hubert Kaufhold, ed., Kleines Lexikon des christlichen Orients. Wiesbaden: Harrassowitz, 2007.
- Hubert Kaufhold, Zur Datierung nach christlicher Ära in den syrischen Kirchen (=Analecta Gorgiana. Volume 125). Piscataway: Gorgias Press, 2009.
- Hubert Kaufhold, Franciscus Peña und der Inquisitionsprozeß nach seiner „Introductio seu Praxis Inquisitorum“ (= Münchener Theologische Studien. III. Kanonistische Abteilung. Vol. 67). St. Ottilien: EOS, 2014.
- Hubert Kaufhold, Ebedjesus von Nisibis „Ordo iudiciorum ecclesiasticorum“. Eine Zusammenstellung der kirchlichen Rechtsbestimmungen der ostsyrischen Kirche im 14. Jahrhundert (=Eichstätter Beiträge zum Christlichen Orient, Volume 7). Wiesbaden: Harrassowitz, 2019.
