= Marganitha =

Assyrian Church of the East theological document

The Marganitha (Classical Syriac: ܡܲܪܓܵܢܝܼܬܵܐ; lit. 'Pearl') is a book summarising the doctrine of the Church of the East written by Mar Odisho, Metropolitan of N’siwin and Armenia, in 1298. The website of the Assyrian Church calls the Marganitha the "official manual of the faith of the Church of the East". The explanation of the author for naming the book as Margānītā (Pearl) is as follows: “I […] wrote this book, small in size and brief, but extensive in its subject matter. Hence, I have called it “The Pearl”, the truth of Christianity; and herein I have briefly treated of the origin, roots, plants and branches of the teaching of the Church” .

== Structure ==
The book is divided in four parts:

- On God
  - Theory Concerning God
  - That God is One and Not Many
  - That God is Eternal
  - That God is Incomprehensible
  - On the Trinity
- On the Creation
  - On the Creation of the Universe
  - On First Man's Sin
  - On the Divine Laws and Ordinances, and On the Prophets
  - Prophecies Concerning Christ
- On the Christian Dispensation
  - On the Advent of Christ, and His Union
  - On the Dispensation of Christ
  - On the Truth of Christianity
  - On the Different Sects
  - Refutation of the Foregoing Creeds
  - On the Title "Begetter of God"
  - On Four Qnume (Hypostasis)
  - On the Church
- On the Church Sacraments
  - On the Number of the Church Sacraments
  - On the Priesthood
  - On Baptism
  - On the Oil of Unction
  - On the Oblation
  - On the Holy Leaven
  - On the Remission of Sins and Repentance
  - On Matrimony and on Virginity

The first part is theological, explaining God's necessary existence and most basic features, as revealed in the Old Testament. Following this is the Assyrian cosmology, which sets the stage for the coming of the Messiah. The next part is Christological, attempting to explain the Assyrian understanding of Jesus' personhood and divinity; this is the most crucial part in terms of explaining Assyrian doctrine to other Christian groups, as the Assyrians had been incorrectly labeled Nestorians for centuries. The thrust of this section is largely ecumenical, in an attempt to reconcile the linguistic and cultural forces that kept the Assyrians from the larger Christian community. The final division concerns the practice and significance of Christian sacraments. An appendix of the Assyrian patriarchs often follows the text of the book.
