= Gabriel of Basra =

Bishop

Gabriel of Baṣra (fl. 884–893) was a bishop and jurist of the Church of the East.

Little is known of Gabriel's life other than that he was metropolitan of Baṣra in 884 and 893.

Sometime in the last quarter of the ninth century, he compiled the first nomocanon (collection of canon law) in the history of the Church of the East. Only fragments of the original Syriac survive, but the work can be largely reconstructed because of its extensive quotation and citation in the Arabic collection Fiqh al-Naṣrāniyya of Ibn al-Ṭayyib (11th century) and the Syriac Nomokanon of ʿAbdishoʿ bar Brikha (14th century). Hubert Kaufhold performed the work of reconstruction, publishing it with a German translation in Die Rechtssammlung des Gabriel von Baṣra (1976). The original title of the work is unknown. Sebastian Brock calls it Collection of Judgements.

Gabriel's nomocanon is structured in the form of questions and answers, although this is a purely formal device for introducing quotations from his sources. Only in the section on liturgy are the questions real and the answers possibly the original the work of Gabriel. Gabriel's quotations are often abbreviated and not always word for word. The work as a whole is divided into two parts. The first concerns matrimonial law and hereditary law among other topics relating to Christians in the world. His sources were listed as "the fathers, catholicoi, metropolitans and the Greek emperors". Of the 48 questions in this part, only the last 28 survive in their original form. The second part concerns the liturgy and institutions of the church, such as monasteries, hospitals and schools. One of its most interesting questions concerns artisans' organizations, which includes some Arabic terminology. For this part his sources are "the synodical canons of the Western and Eastern Fathers", by which he means the synods of the Roman church and the Church of the East. Only fragments of the second part survive in their original form.

Among Gabriel's identifiable sources are the 73 forged canons attributed to Marutha of Maypherqaṭ, the Syro-Roman law book, the Synodicon Orientale, a letter of the Catholicos Timothy I and a letter of the Catholicos Ishoʿ bar Nun. He also used the legal writings of East Syriac scholars like Ishoʿbokht, Shemʿon of Rev Ardashir and ʿAbdishoʿ bar Bahrīz.

== Sources ==
- Brock, Sebastian P. (2009). "Regulations for an Association of Artisans from the Late Sasanian or Early Arab Period". In Philip Rousseau; Manolis Papoutsakis (eds.). Transformations of Late Antiquity: Essays for Peter Brown. Ashgate. pp. 51–62.
- Kaufhold, Hubert (2011). "Gabriel of Baṣra". In Sebastian P. Brock; Aaron M. Butts; George A. Kiraz; Lucas Van Rompay (eds.). Gorgias Encyclopedic Dictionary of the Syriac Heritage. Gorgias Press.
- Kaufhold, Hubert (2012). "Sources of Canon Law in the Eastern Churches". In Wilfried Hartmann; Kenneth Pennington (eds.). The History of Byzantine and Eastern Canon Law to 1500. Catholic University of America Press. pp. 215–342.
