= Code of Hammurabi =

Babylonian legal text

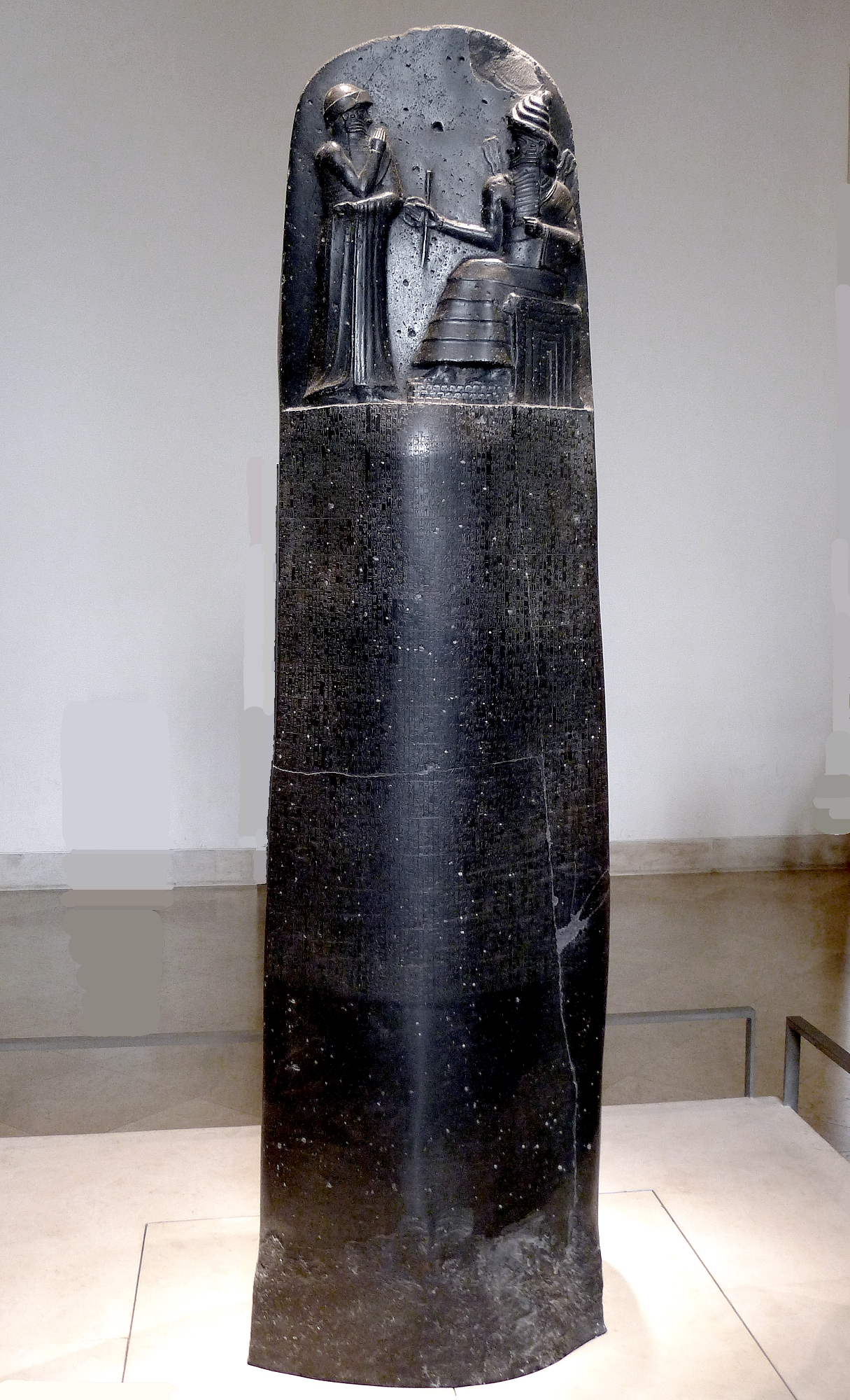
- The Louvre stele
- Created: c. 1753 BC; 3779 years ago
- Location: Louvre Museum, Ile-de-France, France (originally Sippar, Mesopotamia (now Iraq), found at Susa, Iran); Replicas: various
- Author: Hammurabi
- Media type: Basalt stele
- Subject: Law, justice
- Purpose: Debated: legislation, law report, or jurisprudence

Full text
- Code of Hammurabi at Wikisource

The Code of Hammurabi is a Babylonian legal text composed c. 1753 BC. It is one of the most recognizable legal texts from the ancient Near East, written in the Old Babylonian dialect of Akkadian, purportedly by Hammurabi, sixth king of the First Dynasty of Babylon. The primary copy of the text is inscribed on a basalt stele 2.25 m (7 ft 4 1/2 in) tall.

The stele was rediscovered in 1901 at the site of Susa in present-day Iran, where it had been taken as plunder 600 years after its creation. The text itself was copied and studied by Mesopotamian scribes for over a millennium. The stele now resides in the Louvre Museum.

The top of the stele features an image in relief of Hammurabi with Shamash, the Babylonian sun god and god of justice. Below the relief are about 4,130 lines of cuneiform text: one fifth contains a prologue and epilogue in poetic style, while the remaining four fifths contain what are generally called the "laws". In the prologue, Hammurabi claims to have been granted his rule by the gods "to prevent the strong from oppressing the weak". The laws are casuistic, expressed as "if ... then" conditional sentences. Their scope is broad, including, for example, criminal law, family law, property law, and commercial law.

Modern scholars responded to the Code with admiration at its perceived fairness and respect for the rule of law, and at the complexity of Old Babylonian society. There was also much discussion of its influence on the Mosaic Law. Scholars quickly identified lex talionis—the "eye for an eye" principle—underlying the two collections. Debate among Assyriologists has since centred around several aspects of the Code: its purpose, its underlying principles, its language, and its relation to earlier and later law collections.

Despite the uncertainty surrounding these issues, Hammurabi is regarded outside Assyriology as an important figure in the history of law and the document as a true legal code. The U.S. Capitol has a relief portrait of Hammurabi alongside those of other historic lawgivers. There are replicas of the stele in numerous institutions, including the headquarters of the United Nations in New York City, the Pergamon Museum in Berlin and the University of Chicago's Institute for the Study of Ancient Cultures.

== Background ==
=== Hammurabi ===
Babylonian territory before (red) and after Hammurabi's reign (orange)

Hammurabi (or Hammurapi), the sixth king of the Amorite First Dynasty of Babylon, ruled from around 1792 to around 1750 BC (middle chronology). He secured Babylonian dominance over the Mesopotamian plain through military prowess, diplomacy, and treachery. When Hammurabi inherited his father Sin-Muballit's throne, Babylon held little local sway; the local hegemon was Rim-Sin of Larsa. Hammurabi waited until Rim-Sin grew old, then conquered his territory in one swift campaign, leaving his organisation intact. Later, Hammurabi betrayed allies in Eshnunna, Elam, and Mari to gain their territories.

Hammurabi had an aggressive foreign policy, but his letters suggest he was concerned with the welfare of his many subjects and was interested in law and justice. He commissioned extensive construction works, and in his letters, he frequently presents himself as his people's shepherd. Justice is also a theme of the prologue to the Code, and "the word translated 'justice' [ešērum]... is one whose root runs through both prologue and epilogue".

=== Earlier law collections ===
Although Hammurabi's Code was the first Mesopotamian law collection to be discovered, it was not the first written; several earlier collections survive. These collections were written in Sumerian and Akkadian. They also purport to have been written by rulers. There were almost certainly more such collections, as statements of other rulers suggest the custom was widespread. The similarities between these law collections make it tempting to assume a consistent underlying legal system. As with the Code of Hammurabi, however, it is difficult to interpret the purpose and underlying legal systems of these earlier collections, prompting numerous scholars to question whether this should be attempted. Extant collections include:

- The Code of Ur-Nammu of Ur.
- The Code of Lipit-Ishtar of Isin.
- The Laws of Eshnunna (written by Bilalama or by Dadusha).
- The "Laws of X", which, rather than a distinct collection, may be the end of the Code of Ur-Nammu.

There are additionally thousands of documents from the practice of law, from before and during the Old Babylonian period. These documents include contracts, judicial rulings, letters on legal cases, and reform documents such as that of Urukagina, king of Lagash in the mid-3rd millennium BC, whose reforms combatted corruption. Mesopotamia has the most comprehensive surviving legal corpus from before the Digest of Justinian, even compared to those from ancient Greece and Rome.

It has been suggested that, based on a treaty between Ebla and Mari, several centuries before Ur-Nammu, there existed elements of similar law code. Some examples clauses "Breaking a man's arm—10 shekels of silver.", "Knocking out a man's eye—10 shekels of silver", and "Tearing off a Mariote's beard—(its fine is) twenty shekels of silver". The Treaty between Ebla and Abarsal was discovered in the Ebla archives. A number of the sections of the treaty cover matters of crime and punishment. For example, "the penalty for the killing in a fight of a person from Ebla or from Abarsal is the payment of fifty sheep".

== Copies ==
=== Louvre stele ===
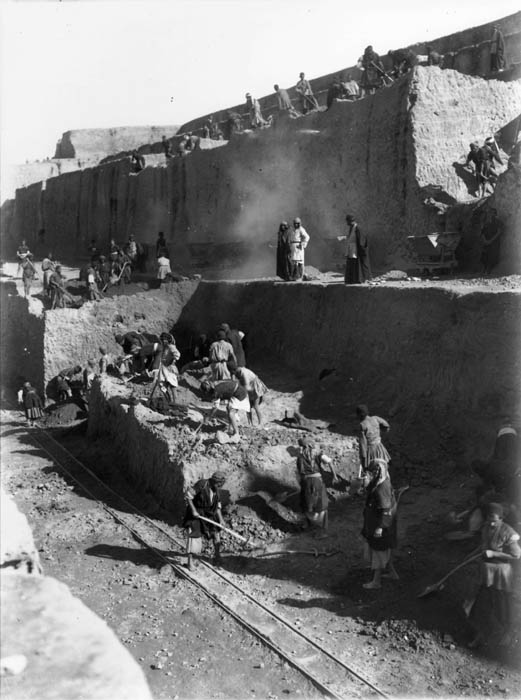
The excavation of the Susa acropolis in 1897–1898, four years before the Code was found at the site

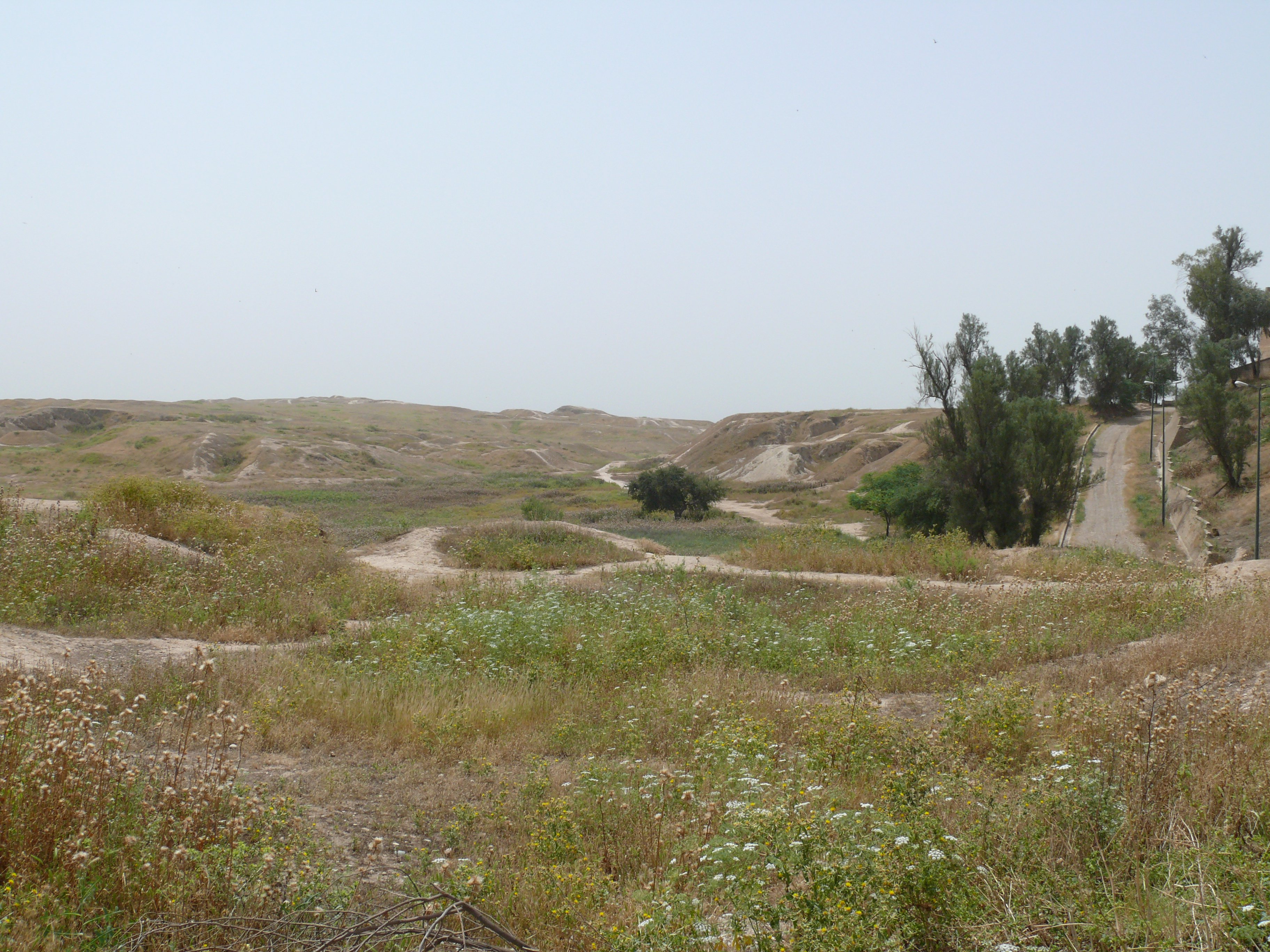
The Royal City (left) and Acropolis (right) of Susa in 2007

The first copy of the text found, and still the most complete, is on a 2.25 m (7 ft 4 1/2 in) stele. The stele is now displayed on the second floor of the Louvre, in Room 227 of the Richelieu wing. At the top is an image of Hammurabi with Shamash, the Babylonian sun god and god of justice. Below the image are about 4,130 lines of cuneiform text: One-fifth contains a prologue and epilogue, while the remaining four-fifths contain what are generally called the laws. Near the bottom, seven columns of the laws, each with more than eighty lines, were polished and erased in antiquity. The stele was found in three large fragments and reconstructed. It is 2.25 m (7 ft 4 1/2 in) high, with a circumference of 1.65 m (5 ft 5 in) at the summit and 1.9 m (6 ft 3 in) at the base. Hammurabi's image is 65 cm (2 ft 1 1/2 in) high and 60 cm (1 ft 11 1/2 in) wide.

The Louvre stele was found at the site of the ancient Elamite city of Susa. Susa is in modern-day Khuzestan Province, Iran (Persia at the time of excavation). The stele was excavated by the French Archaeological Mission under the direction of Jacques de Morgan. Father Jean-Vincent Scheil published the initial report in the fourth volume of the Reports of the Delegation to Persia (Mémoires de la Délégation en Perse). According to Scheil, the stele's fragments were found on the tell of the Susa acropolis (l'Acropole de Suse), between December 1901 and January 1902. The few, large fragments made assembly easy.

Scheil hypothesised that the stele had been taken to Susa by the Elamite king Shutruk-Nakhunte and that he had commissioned the erasure of several columns of laws to write his legend there. It has been proposed that the relief portion of the stele, especially the beards of Hammurabi and Shamash, was similarly "restored" at the same time. Roth suggests the stele was taken as plunder from Sippar, where Hammurabi lived towards the end of his reign.

=== Other copies ===
Fragments of a second and possibly third stele recording the Code were found along with the Louvre stele at Susa. Over 50 manuscripts containing the laws are known. They were found not only in Susa but also in Babylon, Nineveh, Assur, Borsippa, Nippur, Sippar, Ur, Larsa, and more. Copies were created during Hammurabi's reign, and also after it, since the text became a part of the scribal curriculum. Copies have been found dating from 1,000 years after the stele's creation, and a catalog from the library of Neo-Assyrian king Ashurbanipal lists a copy of the "judgments of Hammurabi". The additional copies fill in most of the stele's original text, including much of the erased section.

== Early scholarship ==
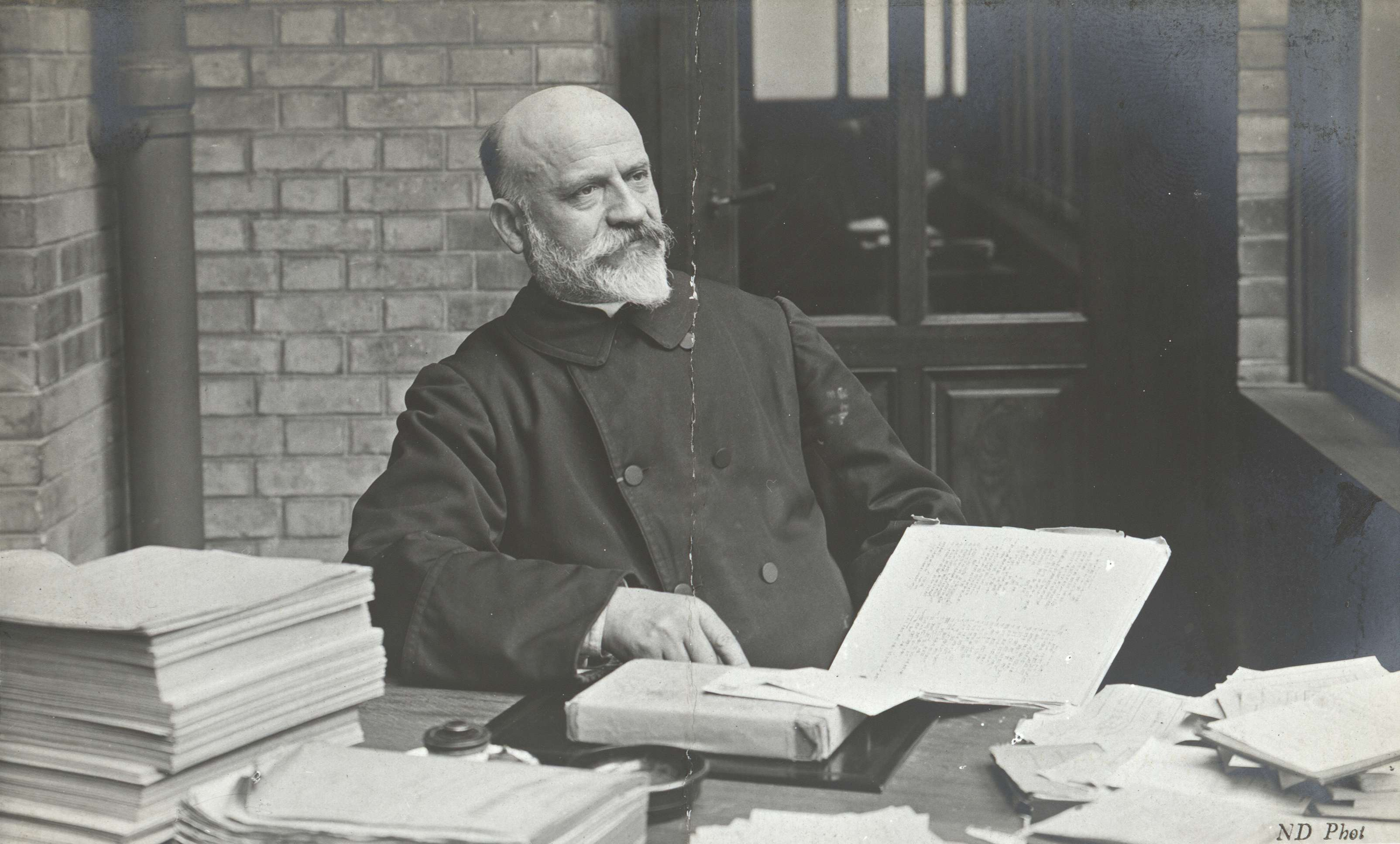
Father Jean-Vincent Scheil, first modern editor of the Code

The editio princeps of the Code was published by Father Jean-Vincent Scheil in 1902, in the fourth volume of the Reports of the Delegation to Persia (Mémoires de la Délégation en Perse). After a brief introduction with details of the excavation, Scheil gave a transliteration and a free translation into French, as well as a selection of images. Editions in other languages soon followed: in German by Hugo Winckler in 1902, in English by Claude Johns in 1903, and in Italian by Pietro Bonfante, also in 1903.

The Code was thought to be the earliest Mesopotamian law collection when it was rediscovered in 1902—for example, Claude Johns' 1903 book was titled The Oldest Code of Laws in the World. The English writer H. G. Wells included Hammurabi in the first volume of The Outline of History, and to Wells too the Code was "the earliest known code of law". However, three earlier collections were rediscovered afterwards: the Code of Lipit-Ishtar in 1947, the Laws of Eshnunna in 1948, and the Code of Ur-Nammu in 1952. Early commentators dated Hammurabi and the stele to the 23rd century BC. However, this is an earlier estimate than even the "ultra-long chronology" would support. The Code was compiled near the end of Hammurabi's reign. This was deduced partly from the list of his achievements in the prologue.

Scheil enthused about the stele's importance and perceived fairness, calling it "a moral and political masterpiece". Claude Johns called it "one of the most important monuments in the history of the human race". He remarked that "there are many humanitarian clauses and much protection is given the weak and the helpless", and even lauded a "wonderful modernity of spirit". John Dyneley Prince called the Code's rediscovery "the most important event which has taken place in the development of Assyriological science since the days of Rawlinson and Layard". Charles Francis Horne commended the "wise law-giver" and his "celebrated code". James Henry Breasted noted the Code's "justice to the widow, the orphan, and the poor", but remarked that it "also allows many of the old and naïve ideas of justice to stand". Commentators praised the advanced society they believed the Code evinced. Several singled out perceived secularism: Owen Jenkins, for example, but even Charles Souvay for the Catholic Encyclopedia, who opined that unlike the Mosaic Law the Code was "founded upon the dictates of reason". The question of the Code's influence on the Mosaic Law received much early attention. Scholars also identified Hammurabi with the Biblical figure Amraphel, but this proposal has since been abandoned.

== Frame ==
=== Relief ===
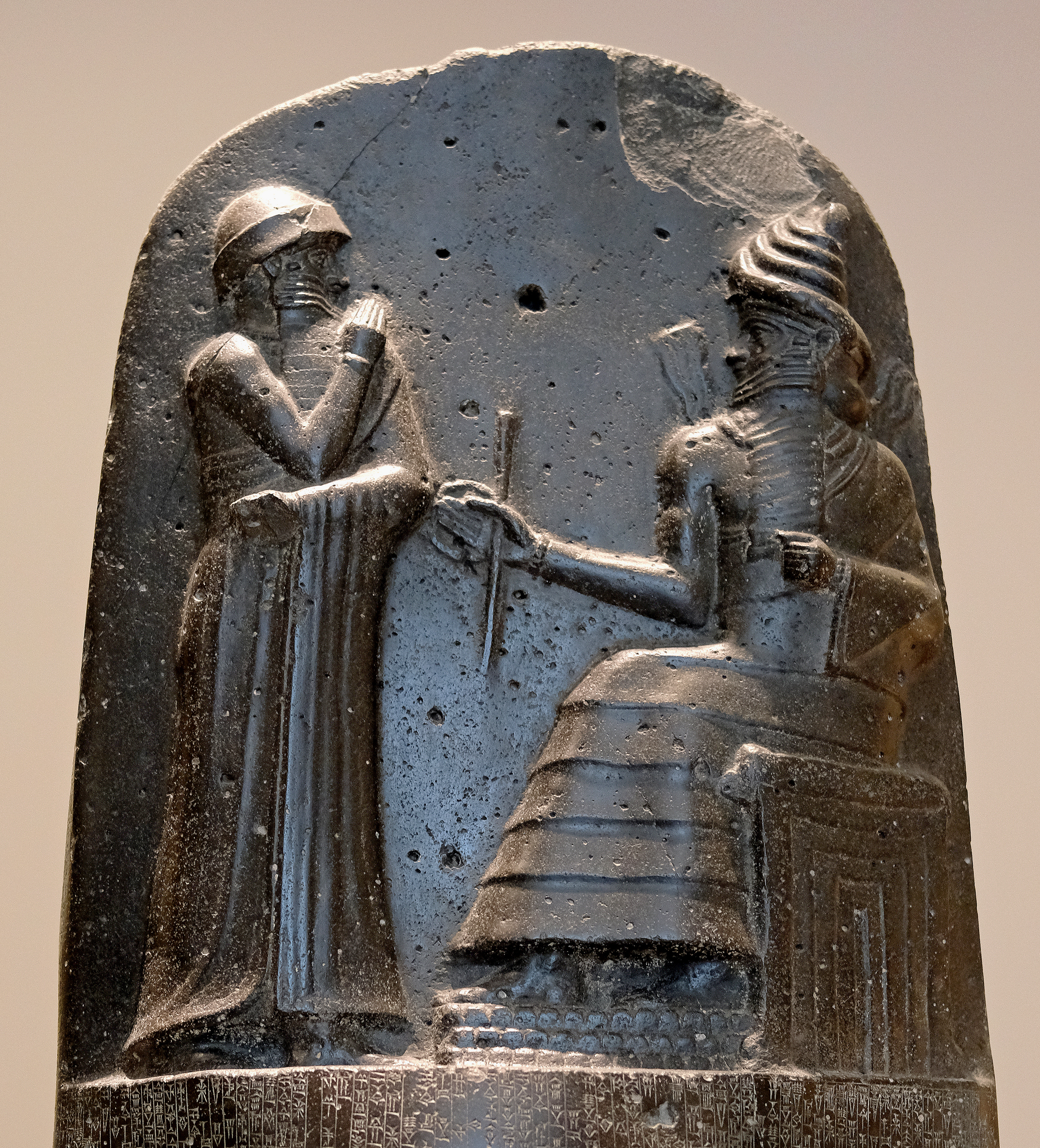
The relief on the Louvre stele

The relief appears to show Hammurabi standing before a seated Shamash. Shamash wears the horned crown of divinity and has a solar attribute, flames, spouting from his shoulders. Contrastingly, Scheil, in his editio princeps, identified the seated figure as Hammurabi and the standing figure as Shamash. Scheil also held that the scene showed Shamash dictating to Hammurabi while Hammurabi held a scribe's stylus, gazing attentively at the god. Martha Roth lists other interpretations: "that the king is offering the laws to the god; that the king is accepting or offering the emblems of sovereignty of the rod and ring; or—most probably—that these emblems are the measuring tools of the rod-measure and rope-measure used in temple-building". Hammurabi may even be imitating Shamash. It is certain, though, that the draughtsman showed Hammurabi's close links to the divine realm, using composition and iconography.

=== Prologue ===
The prologue and epilogue together occupy one-fifth of the text. Out of around 4,130 lines, the prologue occupies 300 lines and the epilogue occupies 500. They are in ring composition around the laws, though there is no visual break distinguishing them from the laws. Both are written in poetic style, and, as William W. Davies wrote, "contain much ... which sounds very like braggadocio".

The 300-line prologue begins with an etiology of Hammurabi's royal authority (1–49). Anum, the Babylonian sky god and king of the gods, granted rulership over humanity to Marduk. Marduk chose the centre of his earthly power to be Babylon, which in the real world worshipped him as its tutelary god. Marduk established the office of kingship within Babylon. Finally, Anum, along with the Babylonian wind god Enlil, chose Hammurabi to be Babylon's king. Hammurabi was to rule "to prevent the strong from oppressing the weak" (37–39: dannum enšam ana lā ḫabālim). He was to rise like Shamash over the Mesopotamians (the ṣalmāt qaqqadim, literally the "black-headed people") and illuminate the land (40–44). (Note: CDLI (2019)'s line numbering, Roth (1995a)'s translation. The line numbers may seem low, since the CDLI edition does not include sections not found on the Louvre stele.)

Hammurabi then lists his achievements and virtues (50–291). These are expressed in noun form, in the Akkadian first person singular nominal sentence construction "[noun] ... anāku" ("I am [noun]"). The first nominal sentence (50–53) is short: "I am Hammurabi, the shepherd, selected by the god Enlil" (ḫammurabi rē'ûm nibīt enlil anāku). Then Hammurabi continues for over 200 lines in a single nominal sentence with the anāku delayed to the very end (291).

Hammurabi repeatedly calls himself na'dum, "pious" (lines 61, 149, 241, and 272). The metaphor of Hammurabi as his people's shepherd also recurs. It was a common metaphor for ancient Near Eastern kings, but is perhaps justified by Hammurabi's interest in his subjects' affairs. His affinities with many different gods are stressed throughout. He is portrayed as dutiful in restoring and maintaining temples and peerless on the battlefield. The list of his accomplishments has helped establish that the text was written late in Hammurabi's reign. After the list, Hammurabi explains that he fulfilled Marduk's request to establish "truth and justice" (kittam u mīšaram) for the people (292–302), although the prologue never directly references the laws. The prologue ends "at that time:" (303: inūmišu) and the laws begin.

=== Epilogue ===
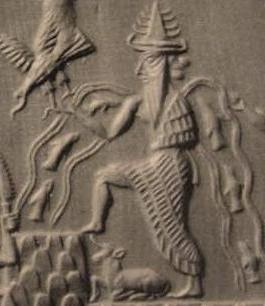
Ea/Enki, god of wisdom whom Hammurabi implores to confuse any defacer of his stele, depicted on a cylinder seal c. 2300 BC

Unlike the prologue, the 500-line epilogue is explicitly related to the laws. The epilogue begins (3144'–3151'): "These are the just decisions which Hammurabi ... has established" (dīnāt mīšarim ša ḫammurabi... ukinnu-ma). He exalts his laws and his magnanimity (3152'–3239'). He then expresses a hope that "any wronged man who has a lawsuit" (awīlum ḫablum ša awātam iraššû) may have the laws of the stele read aloud to him and know his rights (3240'–3256'). This would bring Hammurabi praise (3257'–3275') and divine favour (3276'–3295'). Hammurabi wishes for good fortune for any ruler who heeds his pronouncements and respects his stele (3296'–3359'). However, he invokes the wrath of the gods on any man who disobeys or erases his pronouncements (3360'–3641', the end of the text).

The epilogue contains much legal imagery, and the phrase "to prevent the strong from oppressing the weak" (3202'–3203': dannum enšam ana lā ḫabālim) is reused from the prologue. However, the king's main concern appears to be ensuring that his achievements are not forgotten and his name not sullied. The list of curses heaped upon any future defacer is 281 lines long and extremely forceful. Some of the curses are very vivid: "may the god Sin ... decree for him a life that is no better than death" (3486'–3508': sîn... balāṭam ša itti mūtim šitannu ana šīmtim lišīmšum); "may he [the future defacer] conclude every day, month, and year of his reign with groaning and mourning" (3497'–3501': ūmī warḫī šanāt palēšu ina tānēḫim u dimmatim lišaqti); may he experience "the spilling of his life force like water" (3435'–3436': tabāk napištišu kīma mê). Hammurabi implores a variety of gods individually to turn their particular attributes against the defacer. For example: "may the [storm] god Adad ... deprive him of the benefits of rain from heaven and flood from the springs" (3509'–3515': adad... zunnī ina šamê mīlam ina nagbim līṭeršu); "may the god [of wisdom] Ea ... deprive him of all understanding and wisdom, and may he lead him into confusion" (3440'–3451': ea... uznam u nēmeqam līṭeršu-ma ina mīšītim littarrūšu). Gods and goddesses are invoked in this order:

1. Anum (3387'–3394')
2. Enlil (3395'–3422')
3. Ninlil (3423'–3439')
4. Ea (3440'–3458')
5. Shamash (3459'–3485')
6. Sin (3486'–3508')
7. Adad (3509'–3525')
8. Zababa (3526'–3536')
9. Ishtar (3537'–3573')
10. Nergal (3574'–3589')
11. Nintu (3590'–3599')
12. Ninkarrak (3600'–3619')
13. All the gods (3620'–3635')
14. Enlil, a second time (3636'–3641')

== Laws ==
The Code of Hammurabi is the longest and best-organised legal text from the ancient Near East, as well as the best-preserved. The classification below (columns 1–3) is Driver & Miles', with several amendments, and Roth's translation is used. Laws represented by letters are those reconstructed primarily from documents other than the Louvre stele.

Legal areas covered in the Code of Hammurabi, along with specific provisions and examples
| Legal area | Laws | Specific provisions | Example (English) | Example (Akkadian) |
|---|---|---|---|---|
| Offences against the administration of law | 1–5 | false charges (1–2); false testimony (3–4); falsification of judgement (5) | If a man accuses another man and charges him with homicide, but cannot bring proof against him, his accuser shall be killed. (1) | šumma awīlum awīlam ubbir-ma nērtam elišu iddi-ma lā uktīnšu mubbiršu iddâk (1) |
| Property offences | 6–25 | stealing and receiving stolen property (6–13); kidnapping (14); harbouring fugitive slaves (15–20); breaking and entering (21); burglary (22–24); looting burning houses (25) | If a man breaks into a house, they shall kill him and hang him in front of that very breach. (21) | šumma awīlum bītam ipluš ina pāni pilšim šuāti idukkūšu-ma iḫallalūšu (21) |
| Land and houses | 26–k | tenure of fiefs (26–41); duties of farmers (42–48); debts of farmers (49–52); irrigation offences (53–56); cattle trespass (57–58); cutting down trees (59); care of date orchards (60–a); offences connected with houses (b–k) | If a man has a debt lodged against him, and the storm-god Adad devastates his field or a flood sweeps away the crops, or there is no grain grown in the field due to insufficient water—in that year he will not repay grain to his creditor; he shall suspend performance of his contract [literally "wet his clay tablet"] and he will not give interest payments for that year. (48) | šumma awīlum ḫubullum elišu ibašši-ma eqelšu adad irtaḫiṣ u lū bibbulum itbal u lū ina lā mê še'um ina eqlim lā ittabši ina šattim šuāti še'am ana bēl ḫubullišu ul utār ṭuppašu uraṭṭab u ṣibtam ša šattim šuāti ul inaddin (48) |
| Commerce | l–126 | loans and trade (l–107); innkeeping (108–111); fraud by couriers (112); distraint and pledge of persons for debt (113–119); safe custody or deposit (120–126) | If a merchant should give silver to a trading agent for an investment venture, and he [the trading agent] incurs a loss on his journeys, he shall return silver to the merchant in the amount of the capital sum. (102) | šumma tamkārum ana šamallim kaspam ana tadmiqtim ittadin-ma ašar illiku bitiqtam ītamar qaqqad kaspim ana tamkārim utār (102) |
| Marriage, family, and property | 127–194 | slander of ugbabtum-priestesses or married women (127); definition of "married woman" (128); adultery (129–132); remarriage in husbands' absence (133–136); divorce (137–143); marriage to nadītum-women (144–147); maintenance of sick wives (148–149); gifts from husbands to wives (150); liability of spouses for debt (151–152); murder of husbands (153); incest (154–158); inchoate marriage (159–161); devolution of marriage-gifts after wives' deaths (162–164); gifts to sons inter vivos (165); succession amongst sons (166–167); disinheritance of sons (168–169); legitimation (170); widows' property (171–174); marriage of awīlum-class women to slaves (175–176); remarriage of widows (177); sacral women (178–184); adoption and nursing of infants (185–194) | If a man takes in adoption a young child at birth [literally "in its water"] and then rears him, that child will not be reclaimed. (185) | šumma awīlum ṣeḫram ina mêšu ana mārūtim ilqe-ma urtabbīšu tarbītum šī ul ibbaqqar (185) |
| Assault | 195–214 | assaults on fathers (195); assaults on awīlum-class men (196–208); assaults causing miscarriage (209–214) | If an [awīlum] should blind the eye of another [awīlum], they shall blind his eye. (196) | šumma awīlum īn mār awīlim uḫtappid īnšu uḫappadū (196) |
| Professional men | 215–240 | surgeons (215–223); veterinary surgeons (224–225); branders (226–227); builders (228–233); shipbuilders and boatmen (234–240) | If a builder constructs a house for a man but does not make it conform to specifications so that a wall then buckles, that builder shall make that wall sound using his silver. (233) | šumma itinnum bītam ana awīlim īpuš-ma šipiršu lā ušteṣbi-ma igārum iqtūp itinnum šū ina kasap ramānišu igāram šuāti udannan (233) |
| Agriculture | 241–273 | oxen (241–252); theft of fodder by tenants (253–256); hire of agricultural labourers (257–258); theft of agricultural implements (259–260); hire of herdsmen (261); duties of shepherds (262–267); hire of beasts and wagons (268–272); hire of seasonal labourers (273) | If an ox gores to death a man while it is passing through the streets, there is no legal basis for claims. (250) | šumma alpum sūqam ina alākišu awīlam ikkip-ma uštamīt dīnum šū rugummâm ul išu (250) |
| Rates of hire | 274–277 | wages of craftsmen (274); hire of boats (275–277) | If a man rents a boat of 60-[kur] capacity, he shall give one-sixth [of a shekel] of silver per day as its hire. (277) | šumma awīlum elep šūšim īgur ina ūmim ištēn šuduš kaspam idīša inaddin (277) |
| Slaves | 278–282 | warranties on sale of slaves (278–279); purchase of slaves abroad (280–281); denial of mastership (282) | If a slave should declare to his master, "You are not my master", he [the master] shall bring charge and proof against him that he is indeed his slave, and his master shall cut off his ear. (281) | šumma wardum ana bēlišu ul bēlī atta iqtabi kīma warassu ukānšu-ma bēlšu uzunšu inakkis (282) |

== Theories of purpose ==
The purpose and legal authority of the Code have been disputed since the mid-20th century. Theories fall into three main categories: that it is legislation, whether a code of law or a body of statutes; that it is a sort of law report, containing records of past cases and judgments; and that it is an abstract work of jurisprudence. The jurisprudence theory has gained much support within Assyriology.

=== Legislation ===
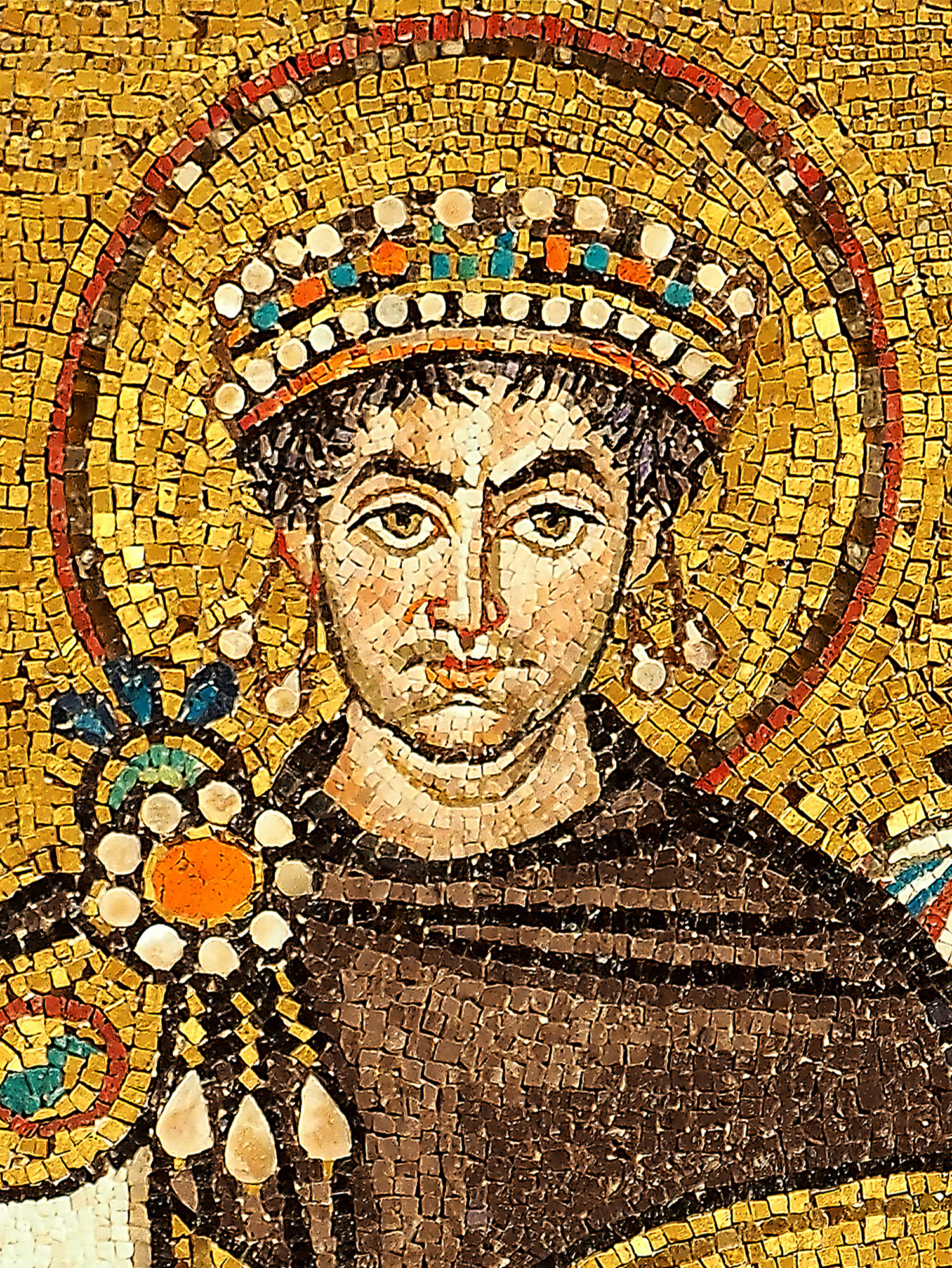
Justinian I of the Byzantine Empire (left) and Napoléon Bonaparte of France (right) both created legal codes to which the Louvre stele has been compared

The term "code" presupposes that the document was intended to be enforced as legislation. It was used by Scheil in his editio princeps, and widely adopted afterwards. C. H. W. Johns, one of the most prolific early commentators on the document, proclaimed that "the Code well deserves its name". Recent Assyriologists have used the term without comment, as well as scholars outside Assyriology. However, only if the text was intended as enforced legislation can it truly be called a code of law and its provisions laws.

The document, on first inspection, resembles a highly organised code similar to the Code of Justinian and the Napoleonic Code. There is also evidence that dīnātum, which in the Code of Hammurabi sometimes denote individual "laws", were enforced. One copy of the Code calls it a ṣimdat šarrim, "royal decree", which denotes a kind of enforced legislation.

However, the arguments against this view are strong. Firstly, it would make a very unusual code—Reuven Yaron called the designation "Code" a "persistent misnomer". Vital areas of society and commerce are omitted. For example, Marc Van De Mieroop observes that the Code "deals with cattle and agricultural fields, but it almost entirely ignores the work of shepherds, vital to Babylonia's economy". Then, against the legislation theory more generally, highly implausible circumstances are covered, such as threshing with goats, animals far too unruly for the task (law 270). The laws are also strictly casuistic ("if ... then"); unlike in the Mosaic Law, there are no apodictic laws (general commands). These would more obviously suggest prescriptive legislation. The strongest argument against the legislation theory, however, is that most judges appear to have paid the Code no attention. This line of criticism originated with Benno Landsberger in 1950. No Mesopotamian legal document explicitly references the Code or any other law collection, despite the great scale of the corpus. Two references to prescriptions on "a stele" (narû) come closest. In contrast, numerous judgments cite royal mīšarum-decrees. Raymond Westbrook held that this strengthened the argument from silence that ancient Near Eastern legal "codes" had legal import. Furthermore, many Old Babylonian judgments run entirely counter to the Code's prescriptions.

=== Law report ===
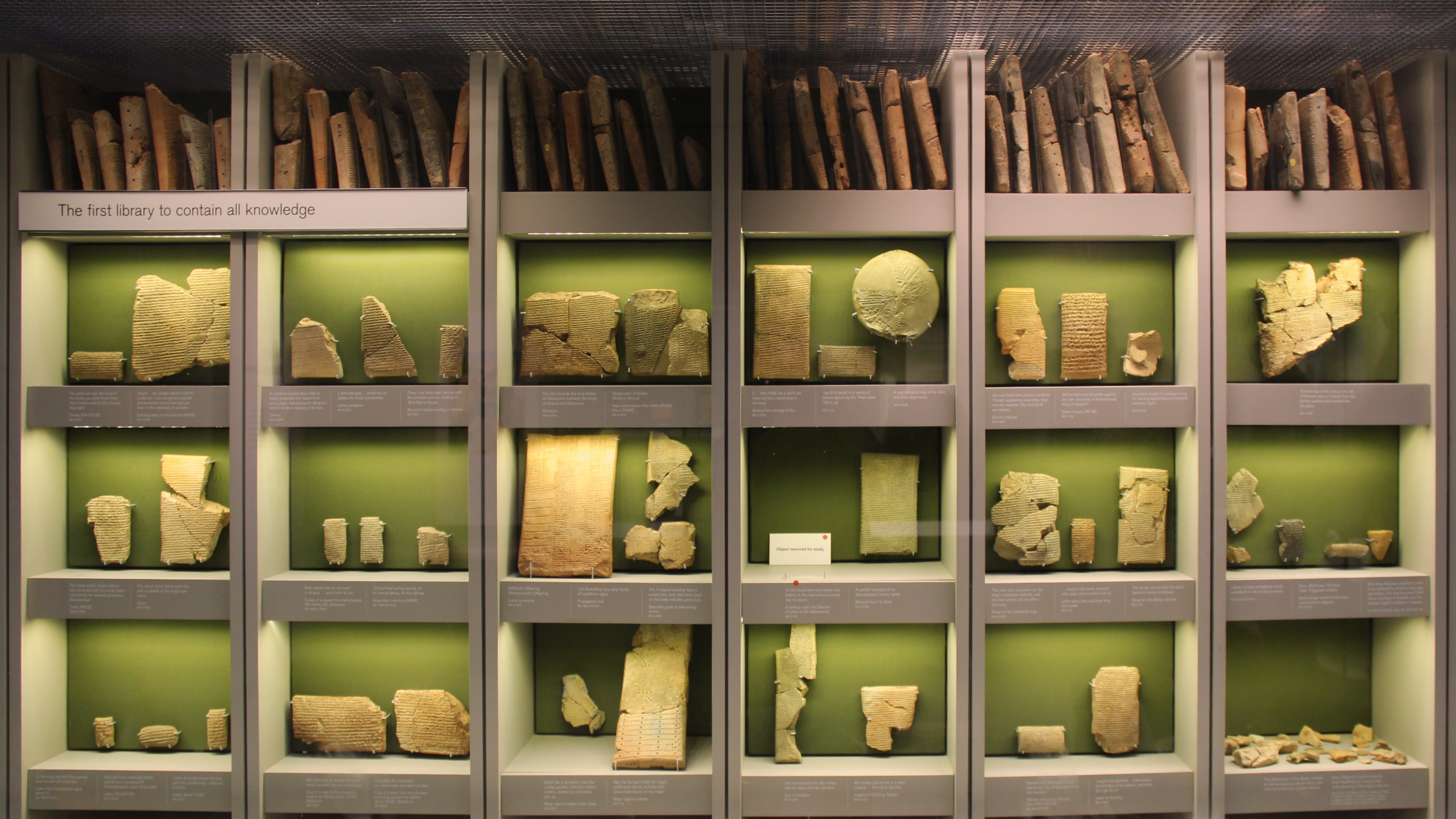
A British Museum display of tablets from the Library of Ashurbanipal. The Library lists a copy of the "judgments of Hammurabi" over a millennium after Hammurabi's death

A second theory is that the Code is a sort of law report, and as such contains records of past cases and judgments, albeit phrased abstractly. This would provide one explanation for the casuistic format of the "laws"; indeed, Jean Bottéro believed he had found a record of a case that inspired one. However, such finds are inconclusive and very rare, despite the scale of the Mesopotamian legal corpus. Furthermore, legal judgments were frequently recorded in Mesopotamia, and they recount the facts of the case without generalising them. These judgments were concerned almost exclusively with points of fact, prompting Martha Roth to comment: "I know of only one case out of thousands extant that might be said to revolve around a point of law".

=== Jurisprudence ===
A third theory, which has gained traction within Assyriology, is that the Code is not a true code but an abstract treatise on how judgments should be formulated. This led Fritz Rudolf Kraus, in an early formulation of the theory, to call it jurisprudence (Rechtssprüche). Kraus proposed that it was a work of Mesopotamian scholarship in the same category as omen collections like šumma ālu and ana ittišu. Others have provided their own versions of this theory. Adolf Oppenheim remarked that the Code of Hammurabi and similar Mesopotamian law collections "represent an interesting formulation of social criticism and should not be taken as normative directions".

This interpretation bypasses the problem of low congruence between the Code and actual legal judgments. Secondly, the Code does bear striking similarities to other works of Mesopotamian scholarship. Key points of similarity are the list format and the order of the items, which Ann Guinan describes as a complex "serial logic". Marc Van De Mieroop explains that, in common with other works of Mesopotamian scholarship such as omen lists, king lists, and god lists, the entries of the Code of Hammurabi are arranged according to two principles. These are "opposition"—whereby a variable in one entry is altered to make another entry—and "pointillism"—whereby new conditions are added to an entry, or paradigmatic series pursued, to generate a sequence. Van De Mieroop provides the following examples:

If a physician performs major surgery with a bronze lancet upon an [awīlum] and thus heals the [awīlum], or opens an [awīlum]'s temple with a bronze lancet and thus heals the [awīlum]'s eye, he shall take ten shekels of silver (as his fee).

— Law 215

If a physician performs major surgery with a bronze lancet upon an [awīlum] and thus causes the [awīlum]'s death, or opens an [awīlum]'s temple with a bronze lancet and thus blinds the [awīlum]'s eye, they shall cut off his hand.

— Law 218

Laws 215 and 218 illustrate the principle of opposition: one variable of the first law, the outcome of the operations, is altered to create the second.

If there is either a soldier or [an auxiliary] who is taken captive while serving in a royal fortress [...] if he should [...] return and get back to his city, they shall return to him his field and orchard and he himself shall perform his service obligation.

If there is either a soldier or [an auxiliary] who is taken captive in a royal fortress, and his son is able to perform the service obligation, the field and orchard shall be given to him, and he shall perform his father's service obligation.

If his son is young and is unable to perform his father's service obligation, one third of the field and orchard shall be given to his mother, and his mother shall raise him.

— Laws 27–29

Here, following the principle of pointillism, circumstances are added to the first entry to create more entries. Pointillism also lets list entries be generated by following paradigmatic series common to multiple branches of scholarship. It can thus explain the implausible entries. For example, in the case of the goat used for threshing (law 270), the previous laws concern other animals that were used for threshing. The established series of domesticated beasts dictated that a goat come next.

Wolfram von Soden, who decades earlier called this way of thinking Listenwissenschaft ("list science"), often denigrated it. However, more recent writers, such as Marc Van De Mieroop, Jean Bottéro, and Ann Guinan, have either avoided value judgments or expressed admiration. Lists were central to Mesopotamian science and logic, and their distinctive structural principles let entries be generated infinitely. Linking the Code to the scribal tradition within which "list science" emerged also explains why trainee scribes copied and studied it for over a millennium. The Code appears in a late Babylonian (7th–6th century BC) list of literary and scholarly texts. No other law collection became so entrenched in the curriculum. Rather than a code of laws, then, it may be a scholarly treatise.

Much has been written on what the Code suggests about Old Babylonian society and its legal system. For example, whether it demonstrates that there were no professional advocates, or that there were professional judges. Scholars who approach the Code as a self-contained document renounce such claims.

== Underlying principles ==
One principle widely accepted to underlie the Code is lex talionis, or "eye for an eye". Laws 196 and 200 respectively prescribe an eye for an eye and a tooth for a tooth when one man destroys another's. Punishments determined by lex talionis could be transferred to the sons of the wrongdoer. For example, law 229 states that the death of a homeowner in a house collapse necessitates the death of the house's builder. The following law 230 states that if the homeowner's son died, the builder's son must die also.

Persons were not equal before the law; not just age and profession but also class and gender dictated the punishment or remedy they received. Three main kinds of person, awīlum, muškēnum, and wardum (male)/amtum (female), are mentioned throughout the Code. A wardum/amtum was a male/female slave. As for awīlum and muškēnum, though contentious, it seems likely that the difference was one of social class, with awīlum meaning something like "gentleman" and muškēnum something like "commoner". The penalties were not necessarily stricter for a muškēnum than an awīlum: a muškēnum's life may have been cheaper, but so were some of his fines. There was also inequality within these classes: laws 200 and 202, for example, show that one awīlum could be of higher rank than another.

The above principles are distant in spirit from modern systems of common and civil law, but some may be more familiar. One such principle is the presumption of innocence; the first two laws of the stele prescribe punishments, determined by lex talionis, for unsubstantiated accusations. Written evidence was valued highly, especially in matters of contract. One crime was given only one punishment. The laws also recognized the importance of the intentions of a defendant. Lastly, the Code's establishment on public stelae was supposedly intended to increase access to justice. Whether or not this was true, suggesting that a wronged man have the stele read aloud to him (lines 3240'–3254') is a concrete measure in this direction, given the inaccessibility of scribal education in the Old Babylonian period.

The prologue asserts that Hammurabi was chosen by the gods. Raymond Westbrook observed that in ancient Near Eastern law, "the king was the primary source of legislation". However, they could delegate their god-given legal authority to judges. However, as Owen B. Jenkins observed, the prescriptions themselves bear "an astonishing absence ... of all theological or even ceremonial law".

The code also fixed commodity prices and introduced a maximum 20% interest rate, together with a minimum wage law providing higher rates of pay for those in seasonal employment.

== Language ==
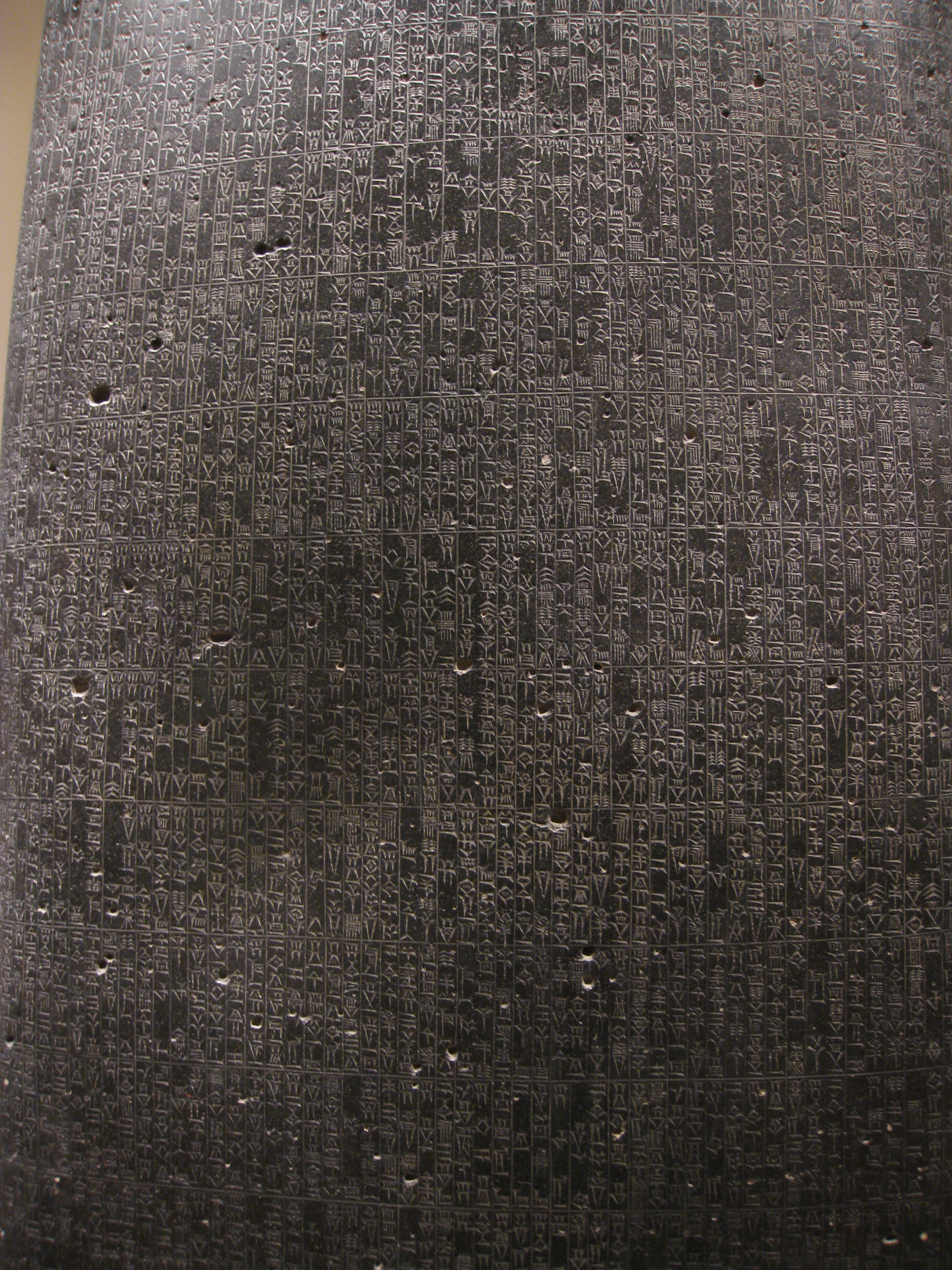
The text. The arrangement of the Code's cuneiform was antiquated when it was written

The laws are written in the Old Babylonian dialect of Akkadian. Their style is regular and repetitive, and today they are a standard set text for introductory Akkadian classes. However, as A. Leo Oppenheim summarises, the cuneiform signs themselves are "vertically arranged ... within boxes placed in bands side by side from right to left", an arrangement already antiquated by Hammurabi's time.

The laws are expressed in casuistic format: they are conditional sentences with the case detailed in the protasis ("if" clause) and the remedy given in the apodosis ("then" clause). The protasis begins šumma, "if", except when it adds to circumstances already specified in a previous law (e.g. laws 36, 38, and 40). The preterite is used for simple past verbs in the protasis, or possibly for a simple conditional. The perfect often appears at the end of the protasis after one or more preterites to convey sequence of action, or possibly a hypothetical conditional. The durative, sometimes called the "present" in Assyriology, may express intention in the laws. For ease of English reading, some translations give preterite and perfect verbs in the protasis a present sense. In the apodosis, the verbs are in the durative, though the sense varies between permissive—"it is permitted that x happen"—and instructive—"x must/will happen". In both protasis and apodosis, sequence of action is conveyed by suffixing verbs with -ma, "and". -ma can also have the sense "but".

The Code is relatively well-understood, but some items of its vocabulary are controversial. As mentioned, the terms awīlum and muškēnum have proved difficult to translate. They probably denote respectively a male member of a higher and lower social class. Wolfram von Soden, in his Akkadisches Handwörterbuch, proposed that muškēnum was derived from šukênum, "to bow down/supplicate". As a word for a man of low social standing, it has endured, possibly from a Sumerian root, into Arabic (miskīn), Italian (meschino), Spanish (mezquino), and French (mesquin). However, some earlier translators, also seeking to explain the muškēnum's special treatment, translated it as "leper" and even "noble". Some translators have supplied stilted readings for awīlum, such as "seignior", "elite man", and "member of the aristocracy"; others have left it untranslated. Certain legal terms have also proved difficult to translate. For example, dīnum and dīttum can denote the law in general as well as individual laws, verdicts, divine pronouncements and other phenomena. mīšarum can likewise denote the law in general as well as a kind of royal decree.

== Relation to other law collections ==
=== Other Mesopotamian ===
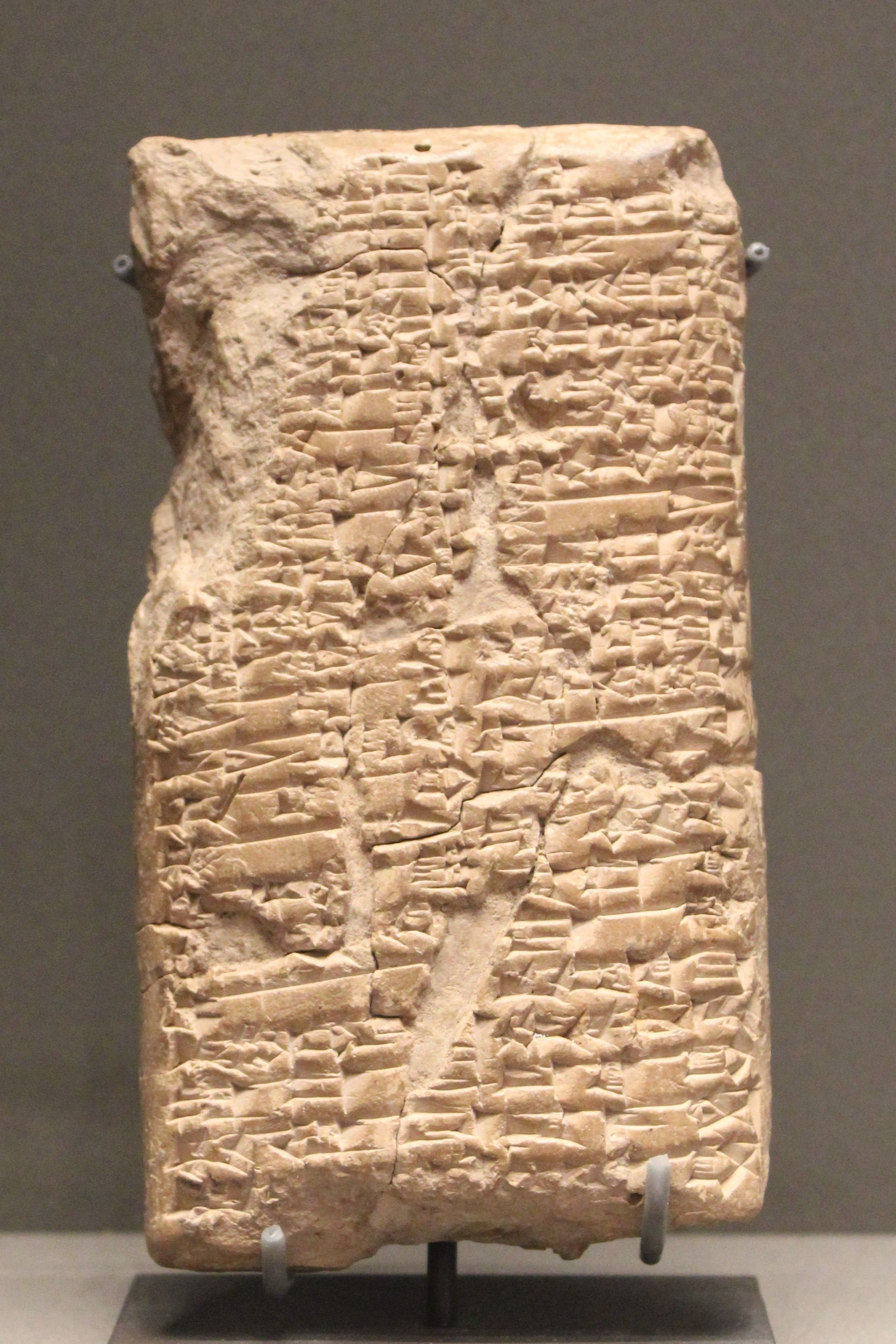
Prologue to the Code of Lipit-Ishtar

The Code of Hammurabi bears strong similarities to earlier Mesopotamian law collections. Many purport to have been written by rulers, and this tradition was probably widespread. Earlier law collections express their god-given legitimacy similarly. Like the Code of Hammurabi, they feature prologues and epilogues: the Code of Ur-Nammu has a prologue, the Code of Lipit-Ishtar a prologue and an epilogue, and the Laws of Eshnunna an epilogue. Also, like the Code of Hammurabi, they uphold the "one crime, one punishment" principle. The cases covered and language used are, overall, strikingly similar. Scribes were still copying earlier law collections, such as the Code of Ur-Nammu, when Hammurabi produced his own Code. This suggests that earlier collections may have not only resembled the Code but influenced it. Raymond Westbrook maintained that there was a fairly consistent tradition of "ancient Near Eastern law" which included the Code of Hammurabi, and that this was largely customary law. Nonetheless, there are differences: for example, Stephen Bertman has suggested that where earlier collections are concerned with compensating victims, the Code is concerned with physically punishing offenders. Additionally, the above conclusions of similarity and influence apply only to the law collections themselves. The actual legal practices from the context of each code are mysterious.

The Code of Hammurabi also bears strong similarities to later Mesopotamian law collections: to the casuistic Middle Assyrian Laws and to the Neo-Babylonian Laws, whose format is largely relative ("a man who ..."). It is easier to posit direct influence for these later collections, given the Code's survival through the scribal curriculum. Lastly, although influence is more difficult to trace, there is evidence that the Hittite laws may have been part of the same tradition of legal writing outside Mesopotamia proper.

=== Mosaic, Graeco-Roman, and modern ===
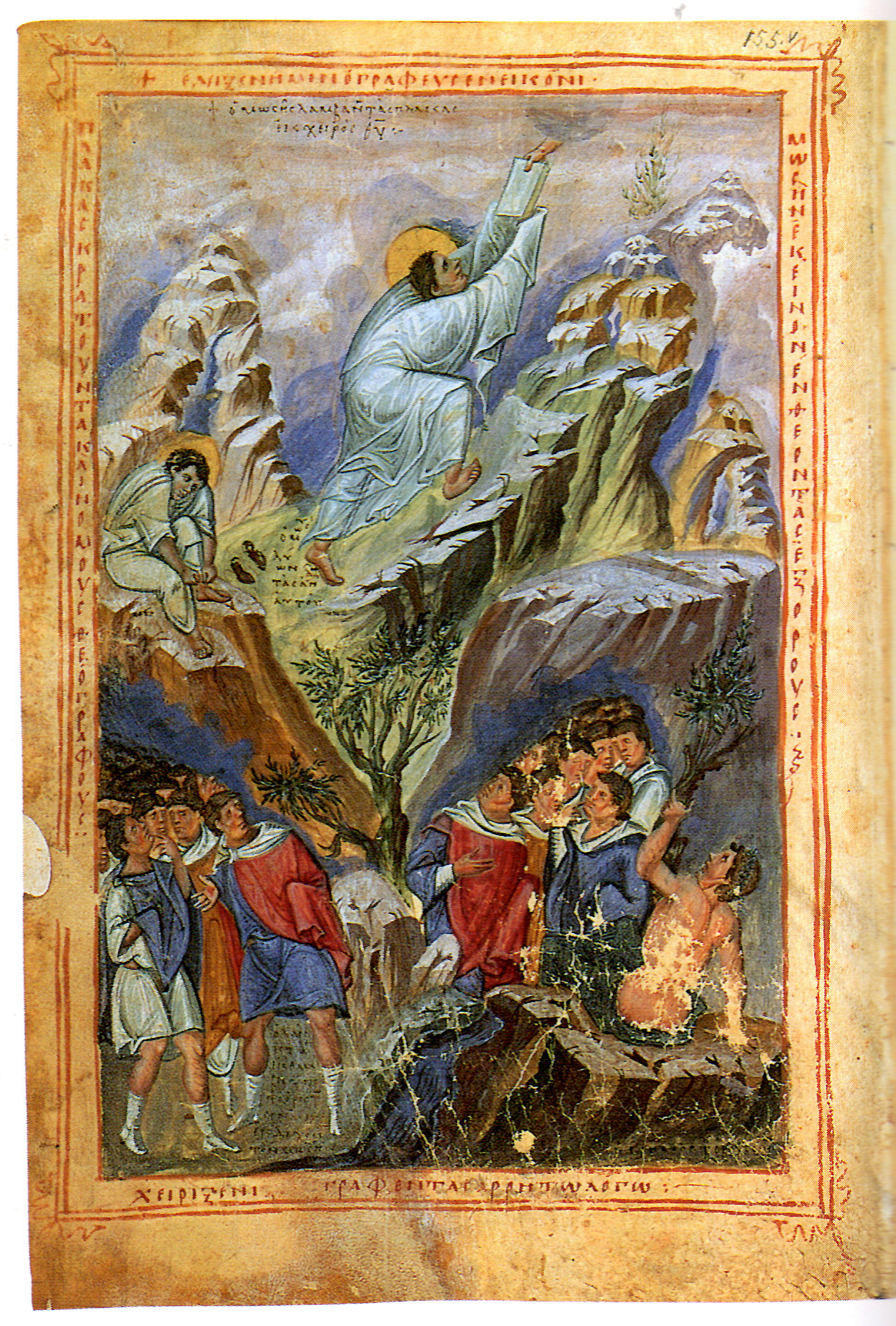
Moses receiving the law on Mount Sinai, depicted in the Byzantine Leo Bible

The relationship of the Code of Hammurabi to the Mosaic Law, specifically the Covenant Code of Exodus 20:22–23:19, has been a subject of discussion since its discovery. Friedrich Delitzsch argued the case for strong influence in a 1902 lecture, in one episode of the "Babel und Bibel" ("Babel and Bible", or "Panbabylonism") debate on the influence of ancient Mesopotamian cultures on ancient Israel. However, he was met with strong resistance. There was cultural contact between Mesopotamia and the Levant, and Middle Bronze Age tablets of casuistic cuneiform law have been found at Hazor. There are also similarities between the Code of Hamurabi and the Covenant Code: in the casuistic format, in principles such as lex talionis ("eye for an eye"), and in the content of the provisions. Some similarities are striking, such as in the provisions concerning a man-goring ox (Code of Hammurabi laws 250–252, Exodus 21:28–32). Certain writers have posited direct influence: David P. Wright, for example, asserts that the Covenant Code is "directly, primarily, and throughout dependent upon the Laws of Hammurabi", "a creative rewriting of Mesopotamian sources ... to be viewed as an academic abstraction rather than a digest of laws". Others posit indirect influence, such as via Aramaic or Phoenician intermediaries. The consensus, however, is that the similarities are a result of inheriting common traditions. In 1916, George A. Barton cited "a similarity of antecedents and of general intellectual outlook". More recently, David Thomas has stated: "There is no ground for assuming any direct borrowing by the Hebrew from the Babylonian. Even where the two sets of laws differ little in the letter, they differ much in the spirit".

The influence of the Code of Hammurabi on later law collections is difficult to establish. Marc Van De Mieroop suggests that it may have influenced the Greek Gortyn Code and the Roman Twelve Tables. However, even Van De Mieroop acknowledges that most Roman law is not similar to the Code, or likely to have been influenced by it.

Knowing the Code's influence on modern law requires knowing its influence on Mosaic and Graeco-Roman law. Since this is contentious, commentators have restricted themselves to observing similarities and differences between the Code and, e.g., United States law and medieval law. Some have remarked that the punishments found in the Code are no more severe, and, in some cases, less so.

Law 238 stipulates that a sea captain, ship-manager, or ship charterer that saved a ship from total loss was only required to pay one-half the value of the ship to the ship-owner. In the Digesta seu Pandectae (533), the second volume of the codification of laws ordered by Justinian I of the Eastern Roman Empire, a legal opinion written by the Roman jurist Paulus at the beginning of the Crisis of the Third Century in 235 AD was included about the Lex Rhodia ("Rhodian law") that articulates the general average principle of marine insurance established on the island of Rhodes in approximately 1000 to 800 BC as a member of the Doric Hexapolis, plausibly by the Phoenicians during the proposed Dorian invasion and emergence of the purported Sea Peoples during the Greek Dark Ages (c. 1100 – c. 750) that led to the proliferation of the Doric Greek dialect. The law of general average constitutes the fundamental principle that underlies all insurance.

== Reception outside Assyriology ==
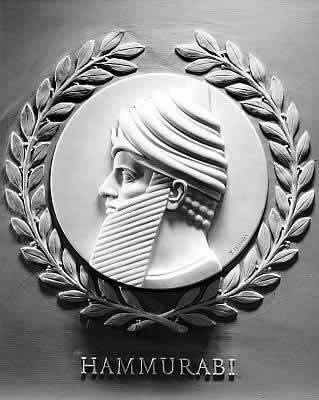
The relief portrait of Hammurabi in the U.S. Capitol, by Thomas Hudson Jones

The Code is often referred to in legal scholarship, where its provisions are assumed to be laws, and the document is assumed to be a true code of laws. This is also true outside academia.

There is a relief portrait of Hammurabi over the doors to the House Chamber of the U.S. Capitol, along with portraits of 22 others "noted for their work in establishing the principles that underlie American law". There are replicas of the Louvre stele in institutions around the world, including the Headquarters of the United Nations in New York City and the Peace Palace in The Hague (seat of the International Court of Justice).

== Medico-legal legacy and political implications ==
Hammurabi's Code is notable for its comprehensive approach to law, covering subjects from criminal acts to medical practices. The Code includes specific rules that regulate medical treatments, set surgery fees, and punish malpractice. For instance, if a physician caused the death of a noble during surgery, they would be severely punished, sometimes having their hand cut off. This harshness portrays how seriously medical responsibility was taken even in ancient times.

From a political science perspective, Hammurabi's Code is valuable and fundamental because it demonstrates how law was used to reinforce social hierarchies and maintain control. The Code's laws were applied differently depending on a person's social class, so nobles received greater protection than commoners and enslaved people. This legal stratification reflects the power dynamic of Babylonian society and shows how law was used not just to govern but also to preserve the social order.

== See also ==
- History of institutions in Mesopotamia
- Pillars of Ashoka
