= Leopold Wenger Institute for Ancient Legal History and Papyrus Research =

Munich law school

The Leopold Wenger Institute for Ancient Legal History and Papyrus Research is an institute of the law school of LMU Munich. It traces itself back to the Seminar for Papyrus Research founded by Professor Leopold Wenger in 1909 (which was soon renamed the Institute for Papyrus Research and Ancient Legal History). It was renamed the “Leopold Wenger Institute for Legal History and Papyrus Research” in Wenger’s honor in 1956, under the direction of Wolfgang Kunkel (and Wenger's large library became the core of that institute's collections). Added to this was the acquisition of the surviving holdings of Wenger’s colleague Professor Mariano San Nicolò. Kunkel’s work in building the institute’s library was also supported by Johannes von Elmenau at the Bavarian Ministry of Culture and the Society of Friends and Supporters of LMU Munich e.V. (Münchener Universitätsgesellschaft).

Together with the Director of the Ancient History Institute of LMU Munich, the Director of the Leopold Wenger Institute for Ancient Legal History and Papyrus Research is traditionally the co-editor of the monograph series entitled Münchener Beiträge zur Papyrusforschung und Antiken Rechstgeschichte ("Munich Contributions to Papyrus Research and Ancient Legal History”). Recent directors of the Leopold Wenger Institute for Ancient Legal History and Papyrus Research include Wolfgang Kunkel, Dieter Nörr, Alfons Bürge, and Johannes Platschek.

In addition to being a teaching resource for classes in ancient law, scholars from throughout world are among the guests and users.
