= Raymond Westbrook =

Raymond Westbrook (1946– 23 July 2009) was a scholar of the legal systems of the ancient Near East. He was born in England.

== Education ==
Westbrook studied law at the University of Oxford, and earned a master's degree in law from the Hebrew University. He studied Assyriology at Yale, and then practised and taught law in England and Wales before finishing his dissertation in 1982 entitled Old Babylonian Marriage Law, for which Yale awarded him the Ph.D.

== Career ==
Westbrook was a scholar of ancient Near Eastern law. Westbrook was a lawyer. Westbrook was a lecturer in law and biblical studies from 1983 to 1987. Westbrook then joined the faculty of Johns Hopkins University, where he served until his death, at which time he held an endowed chair at Hopkins: the W.W. Spence Professor in Semitic Languages in the Department of Near Eastern Studies in the Krieger School of Arts and Sciences.

He wrote or edited books on topics of the law in the ancient Near East, becoming a scholar on this topic until his death from cancer in 2009 at age 62. Many of his writings are collected in the posthumous two volume work: Law from the Tigris to the Tiber The Writings of Raymond Westbrook.

He wrote a two-volume reference, "The History of Ancient Near Eastern Law," a 1,200 page, tome which he edited, in addition to writing about 200 pages on his own. He contributed in free seminars. He also produced a bibliography of his subject.
