= Left Book Club =

Publisher (1936–1948)

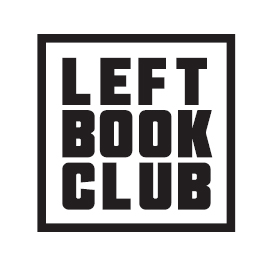
- Logo of the relaunched LBC
- Founded: 1936
- Founder: Victor Gollancz
- Defunct: 1948; relaunched 2015
- Country of origin: United Kingdom
- Headquarters location: London
- Publication types: Books
- Official website: leftbookclub.com

The Left Book Club is a publishing group that exerted a strong left-wing influence in Great Britain, during its initial run, from 1936 to 1948. It was relaunched in 2015 by Jan Woolf and Neil Faulkner, in collaboration with Pluto Press.

Pioneered by Victor Gollancz, it offered a monthly book choice, for sale to members only, as well as a newsletter that acquired the status of a major political magazine. It also held an annual rally. Membership peaked at 57,000, but after the Soviet-Nazi non-aggression pact of 1939, it disowned its large Communist element, and subsequent years of paper-rationing, during and after the war, led to further decline. It ceased publishing in 1948.

The concept and series was revived in 2015, following at least one earlier effort to relaunch the series in the early 2000s.

== Early success and organisation ==
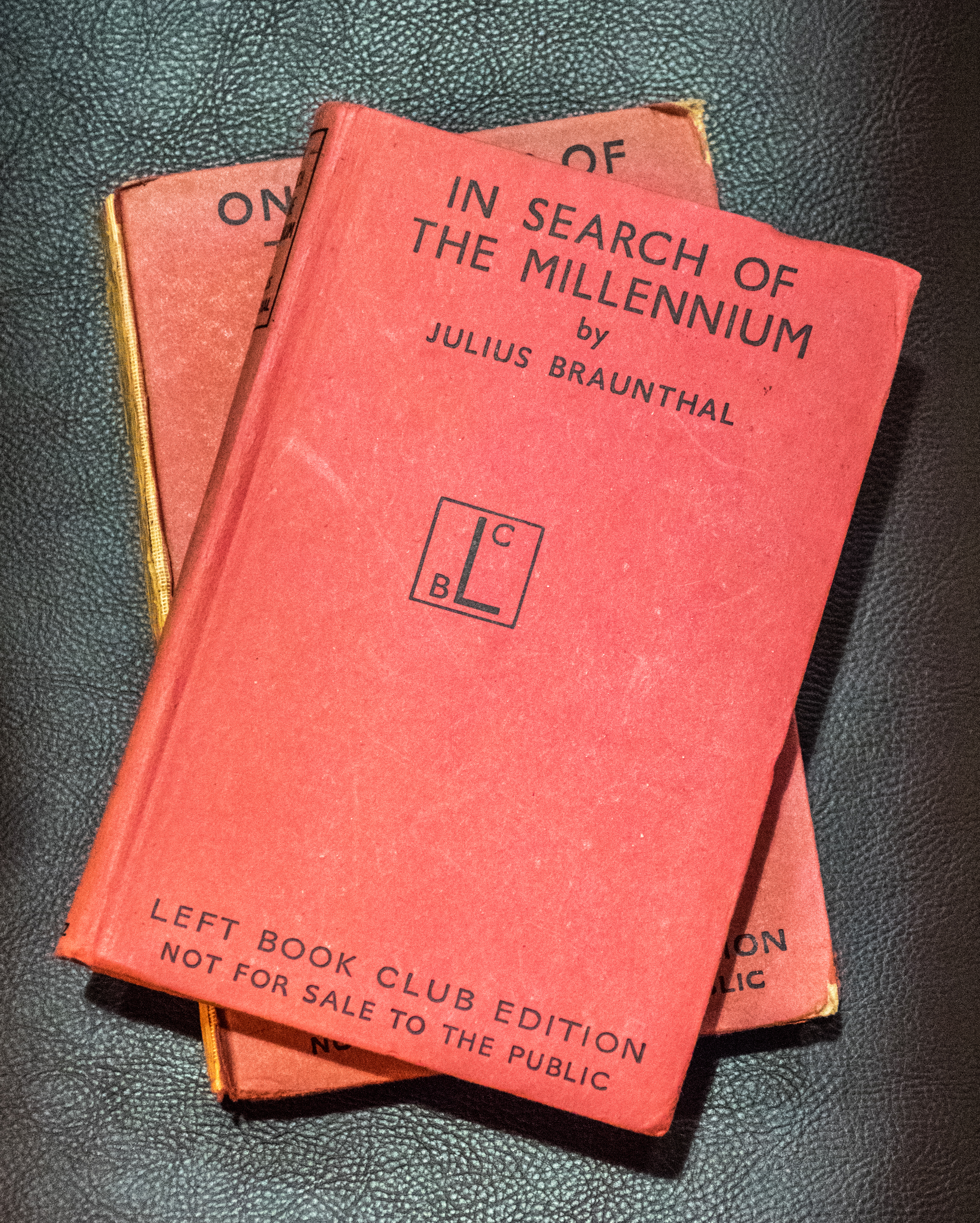
Two books in editions from the Left Book Club: In Search of the Millennium, by Julius Braunthal (1945), and On the Top of the World by L. Brontman (1938)

The Left Book Club, founded in May 1936, was a key left-wing institution of the late 1930s and the 1940s in the United Kingdom. It was set up by Stafford Cripps, Victor Gollancz and John Strachey to revitalise and educate the British Left. The club's aim was to "help in the struggle for world peace and against fascism". Aiming to break even with 2,500 members, it had 40,000 within the first year and by 1939 it was up to 57,000. The LBC was one of the first book clubs in the UK and, as such, played an important role in the evolution of the country's book trade.

Historian Michael Newman says:

Between 1936 and 1939, the LBC provided hope for thousands of people who were seeking a solution to the burning moral issues of the era. Despite its pro-Communist line, the Club's socialist propaganda and education probably ultimately strengthened the Labour Party and contributed to its victory in the postwar election.

The club supplied a book chosen every month by Gollancz and his panel (Harold Laski and John Strachey) to its members, many of whom took part in one of the 1,500 Left Discussion Groups scattered around the country. The books and pamphlets with their distinctive covers—orange for paperback (1936–1938) and red for hardback (1938–1948) editions—bore the legend "NOT FOR SALE TO THE PUBLIC" and sold for 2s 6d to members. Many titles were available for sale only in the LBC edition, with monthly 'choices' received by all members; there were also reprints of current socialist and 'progressive' classics for members to buy. The volumes covered history, science, reporting and fiction and a range of other subjects, but always from a left-leaning perspective.

In response, Christina Foyle founded the Right Book Club, to counter what she regarded as the pernicious influence of the Left Book Club. It offered a variety of titles with Conservative and classical Liberal themes. The Right Book Club was launched in 1937 by Edgar Samuel, who worked for the bookselling firm Foyle's. Other political book clubs included the Liberal Book Club and the pacifist Peace Book Club.

== 1936–1939: Popular Front ==
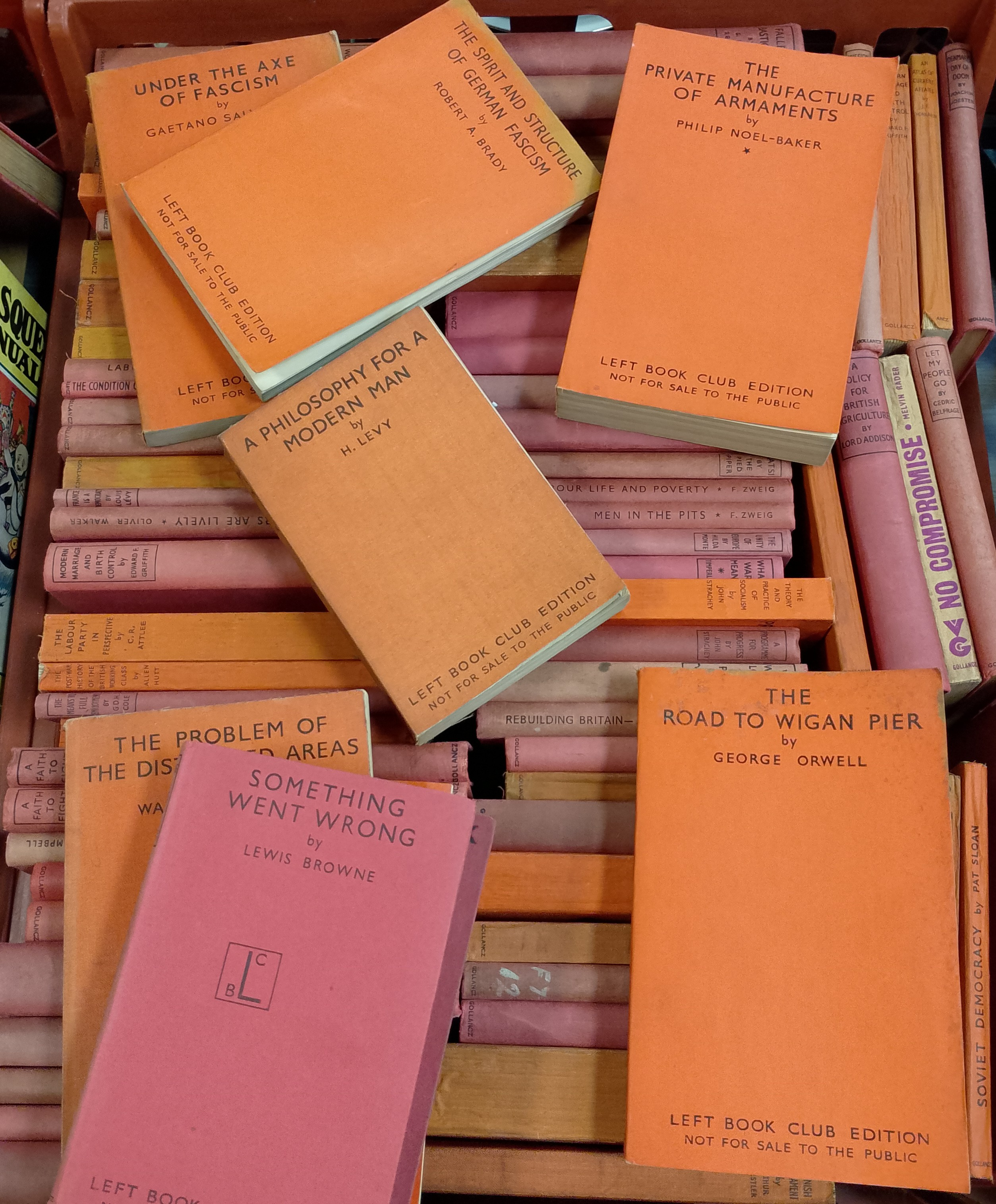
A selection of Left Book Club books

Until the Molotov–Ribbentrop pact of 1939, the club's output included many authors who were members of the Communist Party of Great Britain or close to it, and many of its books offered a positive portrayal of the Soviet Union and its international policies.

World Revolution: 1917–1936 by C. L. R. James was a Trotskyist critique of the LBC's coverage of the Soviet Union during this period. At the same time, Gollancz, as a member of the Labour Party, was concerned to keep the club at a formal distance from campaigns of which the Labour Party disapproved.

Gollancz was a notoriously interventionist editor. He published Orwell's The Road to Wigan Pier but insisted on prefacing its account of working-class life in the north of England with an introduction disowning the book's criticisms of middle-class socialists who, Orwell said, had little understanding of working class life. Later Gollancz republished the book leaving out the second part of which he disapproved.

The LBC held its first annual LBC rally in February 1937, and the tradition continued until the late 1940s. The largest was in April 1939, when thousands attended the Empress Stadium in Earls Court, to hear a roster of speakers that included Liberal leader and former wartime Prime Minister, David Lloyd George; Sir Stafford Cripps, recently expelled from the Labour Party because of his Popular Front advocacy; Ellen Wilkinson another Labour Party renegade prominent for her role in the Jarrow March; and CPGB leader Harry Pollitt.

== 1940–1948: War and its aftermath ==
By early 1940, however, Gollancz had broken with the CP, a process documented in the articles collected in Betrayal of the Left in early 1941. Thereafter the club's selection of authors and titles reveals an eclectic mix.

Despite its large membership and popular success the Book Club was always a huge financial drain on the publisher, and the advent of paper rationing at the onset of the war meant that the club was restricted to just one monthly title. To replace the book club's additional choices and augment the LBC selections, Gollancz launched the "Victory Books" series, a series of shorter monographs available to the general public. These included two of the biggest selling publications of the entire War period: Guilty Men (July 1940) by "Cato" (Michael Foot, Frank Owen and Peter Howard) and Your M.P. (1944) by "Gracchus" (Tom Wintringham).

In addition to books, the LBC also produced a monthly newsletter. This began as a simple club newssheet Left Book News, but gradually developed (as Left News) into a key periodical about international, political and social affairs, with lengthy editorials from Gollancz.

== Authors and titles, 1936–1948 ==
Extended content

=== 1936–1939 ===
H. Gannes and T Repard (1936) Spain in Revolt

- Cripps, Stafford (1936). The Struggle for Peace.
- Malraux, André (1936). Days of Contempt.
- Noel-Baker, Philip (1936). The Private Manufacture of Armaments.
- Olden, Rudolf (1936). Hitler the Pawn.
- Salvemini, Gaetano (1936). Under the Axe of Fascism.
- Strachey, John (1936). The theory and practice of Socialism.
- Attlee, C. R. (1937). The Labour Party In Perspective.
- Brady, Robert A. (1937). The Spirit and Structure of German Fascism.
- Cole, G. D. H.; Cole, M. I. (1937). The Condition of Britain.
- Cole, G. D. H. (1937). The People's Front.
- Collard, Dudley (1937). Soviet Justice and the Trial of Radek and Others. (a defence of the first two Moscow Trials)
- Koestler, Arthur (1937). Spanish Testament.
- Odets, Clifford (1937). Waiting for Lefty.
- Orwell, George (1937). The Road to Wigan Pier.
- Sloan, Pat (1937). Soviet Democracy. (praising the 1936 Soviet Constitution)
- Snow, Edgar (1937). Red Star Over China.
- Spender, Stephen (1937). Forward from Liberalism.
- Strachey, John (1937). The Coming Struggle for Power.
- Tawney, R. H. (1937). The Acquisitive Society.
- Webb, Sidney; Webb, Beatrice (1937). Soviet Communism: A New Civilisation.
- Haldane, J. B. S. (1938). A. R. P. [Air Raid Precautions].
- Jones, F. Elwyn (1938). The Battle for Peace.
- Smedley, Agnes (1938). China Fights Back: An American Woman with the Eighth Route Army.
- Strachey, John (1938). What Are We to Do?.
- Strachey, John (1938). Why you should be a Socialist.
- Vigilantes (1938). Why the League [of Nations] has Failed.
- Addison, Lord (1939). A Policy for British Agriculture.
- Barnes, Leonard (1939). Empire or Democracy?.
- Campbell, J. R. (1939). Soviet Policy and its Critics. (defending the Popular Front and criticizing Trotsky)
- Cole, G. D. H. (1939). War Aims.
- Gedye, G. E. R. (1939). Fallen Bastions. The Central European Tragedy.
- Kuczynski, Jürgen (1939). The Condition of the Workers in Great Britain, Germany and the Soviet Union 1932–1938.
- Johnson, Hewlett (1939). The Socialist Sixth of the World.
- Swingler, Stephen (1939). An Outline of Political Thought Since the French Revolution.
- Vigilantes (1939). Why We Are Losing the Peace: the National Government's Foreign Policy: its Causes, Consequences and Cure.
- Wilkinson, Ellen (1939). The Town That Was Murdered: The Life Story of Jarrow.

=== 1940–1948 ===
- Constantine, Murray (1940). Swastika Night.
- Petegorsky, David W. (1940). Left-Wing Democracy in the English Civil War: A Study of the Social Philosophy of Gerrard Winstanley.
- Strachey, John (1940). Federalism or Socialism?.
- Strachey, John (1940). A Programme for Progress.
- Frölich, Paul (1940). Rosa Luxemburg.
- Cole, G. D. H. (1941). Europe, Russia and the Future.
- Edelman, Maurice (1941). Production for victory, not profit!.
- Koestler, Arthur (1941). Scum of the Earth.
- The Pied Piper (1941). Rats!.
- Snow, Edgar (1941). Scorched Earth.
- Strachey, John (1941). A Faith to Fight For.
- Smith, Aubrey Douglas (1942). Guilty Germans?.
- Davies, Joseph E. (1942). Mission to Moscow.
- Cole, G. D. H. (1942). Great Britain in the Post-War World.
- Mallalieu, J. P. W. (1942). Passed to You, Please: Britain's Red-Tape Machine at War.
- Monte Hilda (1942). The Unity of Europe.
- Neumann, Franz (1942). Behemoth. The Structure and Practice of National-Socialism.
- Cole, G. D. H. (1943). The Means to Full Employment.
- Braunthal, Julius (1943). Need Germany Survive?.
- Burger, John (1943). The Black Man's Burden.
- Hagen, Paul (1943). Will Germany Crack? A Factual Report on Germany from Within.
- Laski, Harold J. (1944). Faith, Reason and Civilisation: An Essay in Historical Analysis.
- Smedley, Agnes (1944). Battle Hymn of China.
- Sturmthal, Adolf (1944). The Tragedy of European Labour 1918–1939.
- Zilliacus, Konni (1944). The Mirror Of The Past: Lest it Reflect the Future.
- Anderson, Evelyn (1945). Hammer or Anvil. The Story of the German Working-Class Movement.
- Braunthal, Julius (1945). In Search of the Millenium.
- Mosley, Leonard O. (1945). Report from Germany.
- Blum, Léon (1946). For All Mankind.
- Brockway, Fenner (1946). German Diary.
- Davies, Ernest (1946). National Enterprise-the development of the public corporation.
- Roth, Andrew (1946). Dilemma In Japan.
- Hill, Russell (1947). Struggle for Germany.
- Keppel-Jones, Arthur (1947). When Smuts Goes.
- Schlotterbeck, Friedrich (1947). The Darker the Night, the Brighter the Stars.
- Schuschnigg, Kurt (1947). Austrian Requiem.
- Cole, G. D. H. (1948). The Meaning of Marxism.
- Braunthal, Julius (1948). The Tragedy of Austria.
- Haag, Lina (1948). How Long the Night.
- Lingens-Reiner, Ella (1948). Prisoners of Fear.
- Walker, Oliver (1948). Kaffirs are Lively.

== Influence ==
Alongside the Fabian Society and Transport House, the LBC's popularising of socialist ideas was a major influence behind the Labour victory in the general election of 1945.

Many members of the club acted as missionaries for the ideas espoused by the club, such as full employment, socialised medicine, town planning and social equality. No less than eight Gollancz authors were part of the new Labour government: Lord Addison, Attlee, Bevan, Philip Noel-Baker, Shinwell, Strachey and both Cripps and Wilkinson who had spoken at 1939 Earls Court rally. A further six were MPs (Maurice Edelman, Michael Foot, Elwyn Jones, J. P. W. Mallalieu, Stephen Swingler and Konni Zilliacus). This led Victor Gollancz's biographer to write, "for an individual without official position, Victor's [Gollancz's] colossal influence on a vital election remains unmatched in twentieth-century political history." However, Gollancz was not rewarded with a position in the House of Lords by Clement Attlee who was worried he would become a thorn in his side there.

The Left Book Club was accused of being under Soviet influence both financially and ideologically. One expression of this was its failure to publish Trotskyist writings critical of the USSR. Another example was Gollancz's refusal to publish George Orwell's Homage to Catalonia: he would not even read the manuscript.

The success of the Left Book Club led to imitation by other parts of the UK's political spectrum.

Historian A. J. P. Taylor points out the membership consisted largely of schoolteachers. Labour Party leaders were annoyed that the club was diverting high-minded middle-class Britons into reading communist tracts instead of joining the Labour Party. Taylor notes the crankiness in the choices of books made by Strachey, Laski, and Gollancz. For example, one of the first two choices was by a biologist envisioning a future in which artificial insemination would enable Lenin (or Stalin) to father every child in the Soviet Union. Taylor denies it was a subversive organisation, saying that "members of the Left Book Club worked off their rebelliousness by plodding through yet another orange-covered volume."

The leftist Nagani Book Club established in British Burma in 1937 was modelled after the Left Book Club.

== Relaunch ==
In 2015 the Left Book Club was relaunched as a non-profit organisation with the aim of encouraging left-wing debate and discussion among its followers. Its first publication was Kevin Ovenden's Syriza: Inside the Labyrinth. Initially publishing four books a year in conjunction with Pluto Press, in October 2018 it stepped up its publishing programme to publish a book every month, working with a range of different publishers. The club remains not for profit and is funded by subscriptions and voluntary contributions. Books are selected by an editorial panel and are chosen to represent the best critical writing on left politics, economics, society and culture, written for a broad audience. Subscribers can choose from classic or contemporary writing. Each book is published in a unique LBC edition which is paid for through monthly subscriptions, and members organise their own reading groups to discuss the books.

MP for Islington North Jeremy Corbyn offered wholehearted support to the project. "The relaunch of the Left Book Club is a terrific and timely idea, and will give intellectual ballast to the wave of political change sweeping Britain and beyond, encouraging informed and compassionate debate. I have a large collection of Left Book Club publications collected by my late parents and me. The works will open minds and inspire. I support the new LBC wholeheartedly."

== Bibliography ==
- Edwards, Ruth Dudley. Victor Gollancz: a biography. Gollancz. 1987. ISBN 0-575-03175-1
- Laity, Paul (ed). The Left Book Club Anthology. Gollancz. 2001. ISBN 0-575-07221-0
- Lewis, John. The Left Book Club: an historical record. Gollancz. 1970. ISBN 0-575-00586-6
- Neavill, Gordon Barrick. "Victor Gollancz and the Left Book Club," Library Quarterly 41 (July 1971): 197–215. http://digitalcommons.wayne.edu/slisfrp/53
- Perry, Matt, review of Laity (2001), Institute of Historical Research, University of Sunderland, archived from the original on 28 September 2006
- Samuels, Stuart. "The Left Book Club," Journal of Contemporary History 1#2 (1966): 65–86. in JSTOR
