= Euan MacKie =

British archaeologist and anthropologist (1936–2020)

- Born: 10 February 1936
- Died: 2 November 2020 (aged 84)
- Known for: First suggesting the term Archaeoastronomy
- Scientific career
- Fields: Archaeology, Anthropology, Archaeoastronomy

Euan Wallace MacKie (10 February 1936 – 2 November 2020) was a British archaeologist and anthropologist. He was a prominent figure in the field of Archaeoastronomy.

== Biography ==
MacKie was educated at Whitgift School, Croydon between 1946 and 1954 and later graduated with a degree in Archeology & Anthropology from St John's College, Cambridge, in 1959, and had a PhD from the University of Glasgow where he was an honorary research fellow. He was elected Fellow of the Society of Antiquaries of London in 1973. Keeper of Archaeology and Anthropology in 1974 and Deputy Director from 1986 - 1995, he took early part-time retirement in 1995 with full retirement in 1998. He was also a Fellow of the Society of Antiquaries of Scotland (FSA Scot.), an Honorary Research Fellow of Hunterian Museum until 2005 and an Honorary Research Associate of the National Museums of Scotland from 2007. Mackie was also a member of the Prehistoric Society and Glasgow Archaeological Society, of which he was president in the 1980s.

MacKie spent six months in Central America as member of the Cambridge Expedition to British Honduras excavating Mayan archaeological sites in British Honduras (now Belize) between 1959 and 1960. At the medium-sized ceremonial centre of Xunantunich the application of the British system of recording every layer exposed, including the surface deposits, produced dramatic evidence for the sudden destruction of the site in the later 9th century, the partial clearance of fallen rubble and then its final abandonment by the elite groups who had lived in it. Thereafter peasants seem to have lived among the ruins. An earthquake was suggested as the most likely agent for this destruction, although this is controversial to many. Subsequent major excavations at the site in the 1990s by UCLA do not seem to have recognized the same phenomena.

On returning to the United Kingdom in 1960 he worked for six months as temporary assistant in the old Department of Ethnography in the British Museum before taking up a curatorial post in the Hunterian Museum of the University of Glasgow in charge of prehistoric collections, later in charge of ethnographical collections as well. His work primarily involved research, fieldwork, excavations and displays. He became deputy director there in 1985 but voluntarily relinquished the post to become a semi-retired senior curator from 1995-1998. Since full retirement he continued to carry out research, to write and to lecture. His research and general interests were varied, and he wrote on the topics in the following section.

== Research topics ==
=== The nature of archaeological evidence and how inferences are made from it ===
This was an ongoing concern for MacKie, which was stimulated by growing interest in some controversial viewpoints in archaeology, notably regarding the vitrified hill forts of Scotland and past changes in the natural environment, their nature and causes. When investigating a topic which is regarded as extreme by most colleagues, how can one know if one is being rational or just perverse? He therefore attempted an analysis of the nature of non-literate archaeological evidence, following on the work of C F C Hawkes, and concluded, in contrast to Hawkes, that there is a fundamental difference between the way economic and technological inferences are made, directly from the evidence and the way social inferences are made, indirectly and by the use of analogy. Ian Hodder has come to similar conclusions. This contrast is extremely important, for example, when considering the type of society which existed in Late Neolithic Britain and which might have achieved remarkable things in the realms of astronomy, geometry and measurement. Is it fair, for example, to maintain that these achievements are improbable, even impossible, because we 'know' that the societies of the time were too primitive to do such things? Is an alternative model of Neolithic society feasible which is equally well grounded in the archaeological evidence but which can accommodate these new ideas? In either case the model of Neolithic society which we favour has to be quite lightly anchored to the hard archaeological evidence and should be changed if evidence appears that contradicts it, and should never be used by itself to question the relevance or reliability of such evidence.

MacKie also conjectured that personal motivation might play a part in determining an archaeologist's attitudes to orthodox and unorthodox ideas. Although this is obviously tricky ground which is full of intellectual pitfalls, and which could come up against the deep-seated belief that every academic probably has – that his or her own rationality is beyond question, he decided to air some of the problems by making a tentative list of the rational and irrational reasons for opposing and supporting unorthodox ideas. The hope – not realized so far – then was that by bringing these issues into the open, a more informed debate about British archaeoastronomy for example might result. His professional demeanour was adroitly summarised by Noel Fojut in his preface to In the Shadow of the Brochs as, "His genial but slightly aloof manner, like that of all the best uncles, always promised that provided the rules are obeyed, fun is in the offing."

His research interests included brochs, rotary querns, the Hunterian's early ethnographical collections, the voyages of Captain Cook, the iron Age and prehistory of northern Britain and the evolution and foreign influences of material culture. Further interests included cultural diffusionism, 18th-century architecture of Scotland, archaeological methodology and museum design. He led several major excavations along with studies of stone circles and standing stones of the later neolithic period, in particular their astronomical and calendrical qualities. He also conducted surveys into the level of skill in astronomy and geometry existed in Neolithic Britain. His bibliography includes over 120 books, articles and papers.

MacKie braved to speak out on several controversial areas of science, suggesting a method of testing various Catastrophism theories in the New Scientist in 1973. He claimed "It is possible, using radiocarbon dates, to devise a simple quantitative test." In "Science and Society in Prehistoric Britain", he became one of the very few archaeologists to put the unit of the Megalithic Yard to scientific test. He noticed that two squares of a side equal to the Egyptian remen generates a root five diagonal that is very close to the megalithic yard. He also showed the links to the Sumerian šu-du3-a, ancient mining rods used in the Austrian Tyrol and an Indus Valley measuring rod excavated from the Mohenjo-daro site. He was importantly noted for being the first person to suggest the term Archaeoastronomy, however he modestly claimed "...the genesis and modern flowering of archaeoastronomy must surely lie in the work of Alexander Thom in Britain between the 1930s and the 1970s."

== Bibliography ==
- 1961a New light on the end of the Maya Classic culture at Benque Viejo, British Honduras. Amer Antiquity 27, 216–24.
- 1961b Disaster and Dark Age in a Maya city: discoveries at Xunantunich in British Honduras. Ill London News, Archaeol Section no. 2059 (22 July), 130–34.
- 1963 Some Maya pottery from Grand Bogue Point, Turneffe Islands, British Honduras. Atoll Research Bull 95, 131–34.
- 1964a Two radiocarbon dates from a Clyde-Solway chambered cairn. Antiquity 38, no. 149, 52–4.
- 1964b The Lang Cairn, Dumbarton Muir. Proc Soc Antiq Scot 94 (1960–61), 315–17.
- 1965a Review of 'In quest of the White God' by Pierre Honore. Journ South African Archaeol Soc 00, 37. ***
- 1965b A dwelling site of the earlier Iron Age at Balevullin, Tiree, excavated in 1912 by A.H. Bishop. Proc Soc Antiq Scot 96 (1962–63), 155–83.
- 1965c Brochs and the Hebridean Iron Age. Antiquity 39, no. 156, 166–78.
- 1965d The origin and development of the broch and wheelhouse building cultures of the Scottish Iron Age. Proc Prehist Soc 31, 93–146.
- 1965e Excavations on two 'galleried duns' on Skye in 1964 and 1965: interium report. Hunterian Museum, University of Glasgow.
- 1966a New excavations on the Monamore Neolithic chambered cairn, Lamlash, Isle of Arran. Proc Soc Antiq Scot 97 (1963–64), 1–34.
- 1966b A burial ground of the middle Bronze Age at Girvan, Ayrshire. Ayrshire Archaeol & Nat Hist Collns 7 (1961–66), 9–27.
- 1967a Iron Age pottery from the Gress Lodge earth-house, Stornoway, Lewis. Proc Soc Antiq Scot 98 (1964–66), 199–203.
- 1967b Review of 'The Iron Age in Northern Britain', ed. A.L.F.Rivet. Antiquity 41, 238–39.
- 1967c Review of ‘ The Picts' by Isobel Henderson. Current Archaeol 1, no. 5 (Nov.), 127–28.
- 1967d Review of 'Inventory of Peebles-shire' by the Royal Commission on the Ancient and Historical Monuments of Scotland. Antiquity 40, no. 164, 320–21.
- 1967 Interim Report on Excavations at Dun Lagaidh, Ross and Cromarty, in 1967. Hunterian Museum, University of Glasgow.
- 1968a Stone circles—for savages or savants? Current Archaeol 2, no. 11, 279–83.
- 1968b Excavations on Loch Broom, Ross and Cromarty: second interim report 1968. Hunterian Museum, University of Glasgow.
- 1969a Radiocarbon dates and the Scottish Iron Age. Antiquity 43, 15–26.
- 1969b Tuineachas Iarunnaoiseach air Tiriodh (An Iron Age settlement on Tiree). Gairm 67, 276–81 (with I.E. MacAoidh).
- 1969c Timber-framed and vitrified walls in Iron Age forts: causes of vitrification. Glasgow Archaeol Journ 1, 69–71.
- 1969d Review of 'Excavations at Clickhimin, Shetland' by J.R.C. Hamilton. Proc Prehist Soc 30, 386–88.
- 1969e The historical context of the origin of the brochs. Scott Archaeol Forum 1, 53–59.
- 1969f Continuity in fort-building traditions in Caithness. The Dark Ages in the Highlands. E. Meldrum (ed): Inverness. 1–18.
- 1969f Review of Hamilton, J.R.C. 'Excavations at Clickhimin, Shetland' (1968). Proc Prehist Soc 35, 386–88.
- 1970a The Scottish 'Iron Age': a revision article on the final prehistoric age in Scotland. Scott Hist Review 49, no. 157, 1–32.
- 1970b An archaeological view of Neolithic astronomy. Hunterian Museum, University of Glasgow.
- 1970c The Hownam culture: a rejoinder to Ritchie. Scott Archaeol Forum 2, 68–72.
- 1971a English migrants and Scottish brochs. Glasgow Archaeol Journ 2, .39–71.
- 1971b The Iron Age pottery of the Western Isles. Actes du VIIième Congrés Internationale des Sciences Prehistoriques et Protohistoriques (Prague 1966), 2, 842–46.
- 1971d Thoughts on radiocarbon dating. Antiquity 45, 197–200.
- 1971e Archaeoastronomy: a review of 'Megalithic Lunar Observatories' by A.Thom. The Listener 28 Jan..
- 1971f Prehistoric Astronomy and Kintraw. Univ Glasgow Gazette no. 66 (June), 8–9.
- 1972a Radiocarbon dates for two Mesolithic shell heaps and a Neolithic axe factory in Scotland. Proc Prehist Soc 37, 412–16.
- 1972b Some aspects of the transition from the bronze- to the iron-using periods in Scotland. Scott Archaeol Forum 3, 55–72.
- 1972c Some new quernstones from brochs and duns. Proc Soc Antiq Scot 104 (1971–72), 137–46.
- 1973a A challenge to the integrity of science? New Scientist (11 Jan.), 76–7.
- 1973b Review of 'Beyond Stonehenge' by G S Hawkins. New Scientist (11 Oct.), 138–140.
- 1973d 'Duntreath.' Current Archaeol 4, no 1, 6–7.
- 1974a Dun Mor Vaul: an Iron Age broch on Tiree. University of Glasgow Press.
- 1974b Archaeological tests on supposed prehistoric astronomical sites in Scotland. Phil Trans Roy Soc London Sec. A, 276, 169–94.
- 1974d Review of 'The sphinx and the megaliths' by J. Ivimy. New Scientist (29 Aug.), 548.
- 1974e Excavations at Leckie, Stirlingshire, 1970–73: first interim report. Hunterian Museum, University of Glasgow.
- 1975a Scotland: an archaeological guide. London.
- 1975b The brochs of Scotland. P. Fowler (ed) Recent work in rural archaeology. Moonraker Press: Bradford on Avon: 72–92.
- 1975c Cultoon stone circle: first interim report. Hunterian Museum, University of Glasgow.
- 1976a The vitrified forts of Scotland, D. W. Harding (ed) Hillforts: later prehistoric earthworks in Britain and Ireland. Academic Press: London. 205–35.
- 1976b The Glasgow conference on ceremonial, and science in prehistoric Britain. Antiquity 50, 136–138.
- 1976c Historical parallels for the megalithic yard. 47–8 in Freeman, A, Bayesian analysis of the megalithic yard. Journ Roy Statist Soc A. 139, part I, 20–55.
- 1976d Review of 'The Iron Age in Lowland Britain' by D. W. Harding. Scott Hist Review 55 (no. 159, April), 62–3.
- 1976e Review of RCAHMS 'Argyll: an inventory of the ancient monuments. Vol. 2, Lorn.' Archaeol Journ 131 (1975), 000–00.
- 1976f Iron Age pottery from the Stones of Stenness. 25–27 in J N G Ritchie, The Stones of Stenness, Orkney. Proc Soc Antiq Scot 107 (1975–76), 1–60.
- 1977a Science and Society in prehistoric Britain. Elek: London.
- 1977b The megalith builders. Phaidon: Oxford.
- 1978a The origin of iron working in Scotland. M. Ryan (ed) Origins of Metallurgy in Atlantic Europe. (Proceedings of the 5th Atlantic Colloquium). Dublin: 295–302.
- 1978b A hierarchy of artefact names for the MDA cards: part 1. Museum Documentation Association News 2 (Sept.), 55–9.
- 1978c Radiocarbon dating and Egyptian chronology. SIS Review, 6 (1–3), 56–65.
- 1978d A heretic in his time (review of Scientists confront Velikovsky by Donald Goldsmith), New Scientist (11 Sept.), 780.
- 1978e Prehistoric standing stone sites (review of Sun, Moon and Standing Stones by J E Wood), Nature 275 (7 Sept.), 75.
- 1979a Man's Place in Nature (review of The ancient science of geomancy; man in harmony with the Earth, by Nigel Pennick). Nature 282 (16 Dec), 657.
- 1979b Sophisticated astronomy (review of Megaliths and masterminds by P Lancaster Brown), Nature 279 (14 June), 656.
- 1980 Dun an Ruigh Ruaidh, Loch Broom, Ross, and Cromarty: excavations in 1968 and 1978. Glasgow Archaeol Journ 7, 32–79.
- 1980? Long letter in Nature about human origins and scientific method.
- 1981a Using the MDA cards in the Hunterian Museum. Museums Journ 80 no. 2, 86–9.
- 1981b The Wemyss Caves, Fife. Hunterian Museum, University of Glasgow (with Jane Glaister).
- 1981c Wise Men in Antiquity? C L N Ruggles & A W R Whittle (eds), Astronomy and Society in Britain during the Period 4000- 1500 BC. BAR no 88: Oxford: 111–51.
- 1981d Prehistoric wisdom. (review of Rites of the Gods by Aubrey Burl and Megalithic Science: ... by Douglas Heggie). The Listener 000 (date), 000–00. **
- 1982 Kintraw again. Antiquity 56 (March), 50-1 (with R B K Stevenson).
- 1982 Implications for archaeology. Archaeoastronomy in the Old World, D.C. Heggie (ed): Cambridge: 117–40.
- 1983a Testing hypotheses about brochs. Scott Archaeol Review 2.2, 117–28.
- 1983b Review of Keith Critchlow, Time stands still: new light on megalithic science, in Archaeoastronomy 6, 150–53.
- 1984a The Leckie broch, Stirlingshire: an interim report. Glasgow Archaeol Journ 9 (1982), 60–72.
- 1984b Red-haired 'Celts' are better termed Caledonians. Amer Journ Dermatopathology 6, Suppl 1 (summer), 147-49 (with Rona M MacKie).
- 1984c Megalithic Astronomy: Review of C L N Ruggles ‘ Megalithic Astronomy: a New Statistical Study of 300 Western Scottish Sites (1984)’. Archaeoastronomy (The Journal for the Centre of Archaeoastronomy) 7, nos. 1–4, 144–50.
- 1985a A prehistoric calendrical site in Argyll? Nature 314 (14 March), 158-61 (with P F Gladwin & A E Roy).
- 1985b Excavations at Xunantunich and Pomona, Belize, in 1959–60. British Archaeological Reports (Int series), 251: Oxford.
- 1985c Prehistoric Calendar. Nature 316 (22 August), 671 (With A E Roy).
- 1985d Brainport Bay: a prehistoric calendrical site in Argyllshire, Scotland (with A E Roy and P F Gladwin). Archaeoastronomy 8, 1–4 (Jan. – Dec.), 53–69.
- 1986a A late single piece dug-out canoe from Loch Doon, Ayrshire. Glasgow Archaeol Journ 11 (1984), 132–33.
- 1986b Review of D. Breeze (ed) 'Studies in Scottish Antiquity presented to Stewart Cruden.' Glasgow Archaeol Journ 11 (1984), 134.
- 1987 Review of H. Fairhurst, 'Excavations at Crosskirk broch, Caithness.' (1984). Antiq Journ 65 no. 2, 500–01.
- 1988a Review of I G Shepherd, 'Exploring Scotland's Heritage: Grampian. Glasgow Archaeol Journ 13 (1986), 87–8.
- 1988b Iron Age and Early Historic occupation of Jonathan's Cave, East Wemyss. Glasgow Archaeol Journ 13 (1986), 74–7.
- 1988c William Hunter and Captain Cook: the 18th century ethnographical collections in the Hunterian Museum. Glasgow Archaeol Journ 12 (1985), 1–18.
- 1988d Investigating the prehistoric solar calendar. C.L.N.Ruggles (ed) Records in stone: papers in memory of Alexander Thom. Cambridge U.P: 206–31.
- 1989a Comment: Dun Cuier again. Scott Arch. Review 2, 117–28.
- 1989b Review of J Barrett, A P Fitzpatrick & L McInnes (eds), Barbarians and Romans in North-west Europe. Glasgow Archaeol Journ. 14 (1987), 73.
- 1990a Leckie broch: impact on the Scottish Iron Age. Glasgow Archaeol Journ. 14 (1987), 1–18.
- 1990b Adhering to the label laws. Museums Journal 1.7, 21.
- 1991 New light on Neolithic rock carving: the petroglyphs at Greenland (Auchentorlie), Dumbartonshire. Glasgow Archaeol Journ 15 (1988–89), 125–56 (with A Davis).
- 1992 The Iron Age semibrochs of Atlantic Scotland: a case study in the problems of deductive reasoning. Archaeol Journ 149 (1991), 149–81.
- 1993a Review of C Renfrew (ed) 'The Prehistory of Orkney', Glasgow Archaeol Journ 16 (1989–90), 89–91.
- 1993b Lismore and Appin: an archaeological and historical guide. Glasgow.
- 1993c The ethnographical collections in the Hunterian Museum, Glasgow. Pacific Arts 8 (July), 35–41.
- 1994 Review of R Feachem 'Guide to Prehistoric Scotland.' Glasgow Archaeol Journ 17 (1991–92), 91–2.
- 1994 Aspects of the origin of the brochs of Atlantic Scotland. J R Baldwin (ed) Peoples and Settlement in North-west Ross: Edinburgh: 15–42.
- 1995a Gurness and Midhowe brochs in Orkney: some problems of misinterpretation. Archaeol Journ 151 (1994), 98–157.
- 1995b The early Celts in Scotland. Miranda Green (ed) The Celtic World. Routledge, London: 654–70.
- 1995c An 'Obanian' antler mattock re-attributed. Mesolithic Miscellany, 16.1 (May), 11–15.
- 1995d Obituary: Sir Grahame Clark. Glasgow Herald 30 Sep 20.
- 1996a Three Iron Age rotary querns from southern Scotland. Glasgow Archaeol Journ 19 (1994–95), 107–09.
- 1996b Review of P Ashmore, 'Calanais: the standing stones.' Glasgow Archaeol Journ 19 (1994–95), 116–17.
- 1996c Review of P Barker, 'Techniques of Archaeological Excavation.' Glasgow Archaeol Journ 19 (1994–95), 117–18.
- 1997a Some Eighteenth-century Ferryhouses in Appin, Lorn, Argyll. Antiq Journ 77, 243–89.
- 1997b Maeshowe and the winter solstice: ceremonial aspects of the Orkney Grooved Ware culture. Antiquity 71 (June), 338–59.
- 1997c Dun Mor Vaul re-visited, J.N.G. Ritchie (ed) The Archaeology of Argyll. Edinburgh: 141–80.
- 1998 Continuity over three thousand years of northern prehistory: the 'tel' at Howe, Orkney. Antiq Journ 78, 1–42.
- 2000a* The Scottish Atlantic Iron Age: indigenous and isolated or part of a wider European world? 99–116 in Jon C Henderson (ed) The Prehistory and Early History of Atlantic Europe. BAR International Series 861: Oxford.
- 2000b Official recognition for an ancient solar calendar site in Scotland Archaeoastronomy Newsletter. 00.0, 1. ****
- 2000c Tour to see relics of the Ancient British Kingdom of Strathclyde. 98–121 in Congress 99. Cultural Contacts within the Celtic Community. A' Chomhdhail Chailteach Eadarnaiseanta. The Celtic Congress (Scotland).
- 2002a Excavations at Dun Ardtreck, Skye, in 1964 and 1965. Proc Soc Antiq Scot 130 (2000), 301–411.
- 2002b The thinking behind the design: archaeology and the new Museum of Scotland. Scott Arch Journ 22.1, 75–90.
- 2002c Where the penalty for objectivity is death: review of Palestine twilight: the murder of Dr Albert Glock and the archaeology of the Holy Land, by Edward Fox (2001). Geophilos 2.1 (spring 2002), 149–53.
- 2002d* The structure and skills of British Neolithic society: a brief response to Clive Ruggles and Gordon Barclay. Antiquity, 76, 666–68.
- 2002e The structure and skills of British Neolithic society: a response to Clive Ruggles and Gordon Barclay. Version available as external link.
- 2002f The Roundhouses, Brochs and Wheelhouses of Atlantic Scotland c. 700 BC – AD 500: architecture and material culture. Part 1 The Orkney and Shetland Isles. British Archaeological Reports British Series 342. Oxford.
- 2002g Two querns from Appin. Scott Archaeol Journ. 24.1, 85–92.
- 2002h Brochs and the Hebridean Iron Age, 277–92 in Celts in Antiquity, Carr, Gillian & Stoddart, S (eds.). Cambridge.
- 2003 The circumnavigation of Scotland by Agricola's fleet in the early AD 80s: possible evidence from Dun Ardtreck, Skye (lecture summary). Proc Soc Antiq Scot 131 (2001), 432.
- 2005 Scottish brochs at the start of the new millennium, 11–31 in Turner, Val E, Nicholson, Rebecca A, Dockrill, S J & Bond, Julie M (eds.) Tall stories? Two millennia of brochs. Lerwick.
- 2006 New evidence for a professional priesthood in the European Early Bronze Age?, 343–62 in Viewing the sky through past and present cultures: selected papers from the Oxford VII international conference on archaeoastronomy, eds. Todd W Bostwick and Bryan Bates: Phoenix, Arizona.
- 2007a The Roundhouses, Brochs and Wheelhouses of Atlantic Scotland c. 700 BC – AD 500: architecture and material culture. Part 2 The Mainland and the Western Islands. British Archaeological Reports British Series 444. Oxford.
- 2007b Rotary quernstones, 492–510 in Hanson, W H Elginhaugh: a Flavian fort and its annexe. London.
- 2008a Clachandou, Appin. 46–7 in Discovery and Excavation in Scotland, n.s. 8 (2007).
- 2008b Sornach Coir Fhinn, North Uist. 204–05 in Discovery and Excavation in Scotland, n.s. 8 (2007).
- 2008c The broch cultures of Atlantic Scotland: origins, high noon and decline. Part 1: Early Iron Age beginnings c. 700 – 200 BC. Oxford Journ Archaeol 27(3) (2008), 261–79.
- 2009 The prehistoric solar calendar: an out of fashion idea revisited with new evidence. Time and Mind, 2.1 (March), 9–46..
- 2010a The broch cultures of Atlantic Scotland: Part 2. The Middle Iron Age: high noon and decline, c. 200 BC – AD 550. Oxford Journ Archaeol 29(1) (2010), 89–117.
- 2014 A Scottish hillfort and adjacent rock carving. The Heritage Journal
- 2015. Excavations on Sheep Hill, West Dunbartonshire, 1966–69: A late Bronze Age timber-framed dun and a small Iron Age hillfort. Scottish Archaeological Journal, 36(1), 65-137.
- 2016 Brochs and the Empire: The impact of Rome on Iron Age Scotland as seen in the Leckie broch excavations. Archaeopress
- 2021 Professor Challenger and his Lost Neolithic World: The Compelling Story of Alexander Thom and British Archaeoastronomy. Archaeopress
