= Rabbi Arthur Schneier Center for International Affairs =

Academic center at Yeshiva University

The Rabbi Arthur Schneier Center for International Affairs of Yeshiva University seeks to promote international understanding and cooperation by providing an educational forum for the exchange of ideas related to critical international issues. It was founded in March 2004.

Drawing on the academic and intellectual resources of Yeshiva University and its affiliates, the Center promotes research and publication by students and faculty. It sponsors public lectures by notable world personalities and leaders, as well as educational programs for college and university students, focusing on a broad spectrum of international issues.

The Center's director is Ruth A. Bevan, Ph.D., David W. Petegorsky Professor of Political Science at Yeshiva College, a specialist in European politics and contemporary political theory.
