= Dilemma in Japan =

Dilemma In Japan
- First edition
- Author: Andrew Roth
- Language: English
- Publisher: Little, Brown & Co.
- Publication date: 1945
- Publication place: United States
- Pages: 215

Dilemma in Japan is a non-fiction book written by Andrew Roth during World War II, and it was first published in the United States in September 1945. In Dilemma In Japan, Andrew Roth warns of the threat of the Zaibatsu, and so-called "moderates" to post-war Japan. Roth describes how the Occupation should treat Hirohito, and cites Hirohito's war responsibility, and the need for him to be put on trial as a war criminal.

== Description ==
Roth cites liberalism, and liberals in Japan, such as Yukio Ozaki, Daikichiro Tagawa, and Saitō Takao, and the Japanese resistance movement, including the Japanese labor movement, resistance within the military, and Japanese exiles, such as Sanzo Nosaka, and Kaji Wataru. Roth cites the importance of liberals, political prisoners, and resisters in post-war Japan.

Dilemma in Japan, was reviewed by Foreign Affairs and Kirkus Reviews. A copy of the book is available at the National Library of Australia, and Internet Archive. In 1946, London : V. Gollancz published a Left Book Club edition of Dilemma in Japan.

== Publication ==
- Roth, Andrew (1945). Dilemma in Japan. Little, Brown & Co.
