= Modern Quarterly (British journal) =

The Modern Quarterly
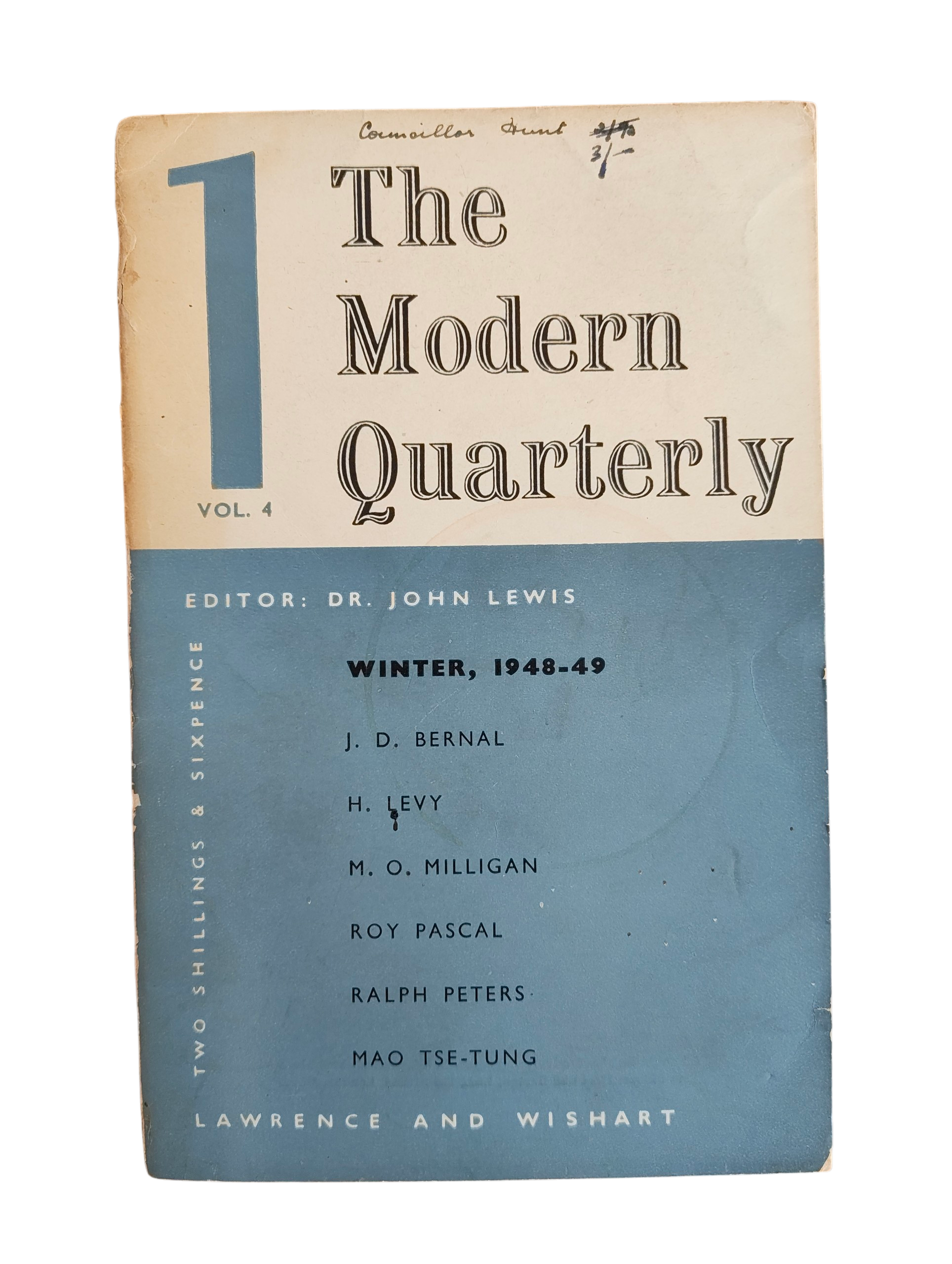
- Cover of vol.4, №1, (winter 1948-9)
- Subject: Marxism
- Language: English
- Edited by: John Lewis (1945-53)

Publication details
- Publisher: Lawrence and Wishart (United Kingdom)
- Frequency: Quarterly
- ISO 4: Find out here

The Modern Quarterly was a British Marxist journal founded in 1938 and was the first academic journal in Britain dedicated to Marxism.

== Editorship ==
It had an editorial council composed of John Bernal, Patrick Blackett, V. Gordon Childe, Wilfrid Le Gros Clark, Benjamin Farrington, J. B. S. Haldane, Harold Laski, Hyman Levy, Peter Chalmers Mitchell, Joseph Needham, Roy Pascal, Erich Roll, Susan Stebbing, George Thomson, and Barnet Woolf.

== History ==
From 1945 to 1953 the journal was edited by the Welsh Marxist philosopher John Lewis It was continuously published until 1953 when it became the Marxist Quarterly. It was closely associated with the Communist Party of Great Britain.
