= Urban revolution =

Process by which villages transform into urban societies

In anthropology and archaeology, the urban revolution is the process by which small, kin-based, illiterate agricultural villages were transformed into large, socially complex, urban societies. The term was coined by the Australian archaeologist V. Gordon Childe in the 1930s. Whereas previous archaeologists had concentrated on chronology and technology, Childe applied concepts and theories from the social sciences to interpret the archaeological finds.

== Overview ==
Australian archaeologist V. Gordon Childe introduced the term "urban revolution" in the 1930s. Childe also coined the term "Neolithic Revolution" to describe the earlier process by which hunter-gatherer societies domesticated crops and animals and began a farming lifestyle. Childe was the first to synthesize and organize the large volume of new archaeological data in the early-20th century in social terms. Whereas previous archaeologists had concentrated on chronology and technology, Childe applied concepts and theories from the social sciences to interpret archaeological finds. Childe first discussed the urban revolution in his 1936 book, Man Makes Himself, and then in his 1950 article in the journal Town Planning Review brought the concept to a much larger audience. In that paper, he presented a 10-point model for the changes that characterized the urban revolution:

1. In point of size the first cities must have been more extensive and more densely populated than any previous settlements.
2. In composition and function the urban population already differed from that of any village … full-time specialist craftsmen, transport workers, merchants, officials and priests.
3. Each primary producer paid over the tiny surplus he could wring from the soil with his still very limited technical equipment as tithe or tax to a deity or a divine king who thus concentrated the surplus.
4. Truly monumental public buildings not only distinguish each known city from any village but also symbolise the concentration of the social surplus.
5. But naturally priests, civil and military leaders and officials absorbed a major share of the concentrated surplus and thus formed a "ruling class".
6. Writing.
7. The elaboration of exact and predictive sciences – arithmetic, geometry and astronomy.
8. Conceptualized and sophisticated styles
9. Regular “foreign” trade over quite long distances.
10. A state organisation based now on residence rather than kinship.

Childe's own work highlighted the urban revolution which he identified as occurring in Mesopotamia in the course of the 4th millennium BCE.

Although sometimes interpreted as a model of the origins of cities and urbanism, Childe's concept in fact describes the transition from agricultural villages to state-level, urban societies. Scientists generally recognise this change, which occurred independently in several parts of the world, as a significant development in human sociocultural evolution. Although contemporary models for the origins of complex urban societies have progressed beyond Childe's original formulation, there is general agreement that he correctly identified one of the most far-reaching social transformations prior to the Industrial Revolution, as well as the major processes involved in the change.

== See also ==
- V. Gordon Childe
- Sociocultural evolution
- List of oldest continuously inhabited cities
- Cities of the ancient Near East
- Proto-city
