= John Lewis (philosopher) =

British Unitarian minister and Marxist philosopher

The Reverend John Lewis
- Born: 1 February 1889
- Died: 12 February 1976 (aged 87)
- Political party: Independent Labour Party (c. 1909 – 1930s); Communist Party of Great Britain (from 1939)

Ecclesiastical career
- Religion: Christianity (Presbyterian · Unitarian)
- Ordained: c. 1910

Scholarly background
- Education: University College London; University of Birmingham
- Influences: T. H. Green; Karl Marx; Plato

Scholarly work
- Discipline: Philosophy
- School or tradition: Marxist humanism

John Lewis (1 February 1889 – 12 February 1976) was a British Unitarian minister and Marxist philosopher and author of many works on philosophy, anthropology, and religion.

Lewis's father, a successful builder and architect, came from a Welsh farming family, and was a very devout Methodist. Young Lewis's social and political views clashed with those of his father. Their quarrels eventually led to his father disinheriting him.

== Education and religious work ==
Lewis was born on 1 February 1889. He attended Dulwich College and University College London, where he earned his Bachelor of Science degree. Having been raised a Methodist, he soon left that church to become a Congregationalist. He began to study for the ministry and became ordained as a Presbyterian clergyman in 1909.

He was accepted to the University of Cambridge in 1910, where a lecture by Bertrand Russell initiated his interest in philosophy. After receiving his MA, he "declared himself a Christian Platonist and converted to Unitarianism." He then received a floating appointment as a pastor of the Unitarian church in Ipswich.

He earned his Doctor of Philosophy degree in philosophy from the University of Birmingham in 1918, becoming a lecturer in moral and social philosophy at Birmingham and then later at Cambridge. He was appointed lecturer in philosophy at Morley College, London, in 1944.

In Ipswich, his congregation was "composed of many trade unionists", and this led him to join the Plebs League. His leftist political sermons attracted a large youth following, but upset a group of older, more conservative members. Their complaints led Lewis to offer his resignation, to be put to a vote of the membership. In a packed and charged meeting, he received the support of the majority of church members.

== Political and social activism ==
Lewis joined the Independent Labour Party when he was twenty years old. He participated in anti-war political activity starting in 1916. On one occasion, he had to be rescued from an angry crowd. He also became involved in work to support the unemployed, and served on the local Trades Union Council. On one occasion, at Christmas, he led a group of unemployed men who marched to the Town Hall, where the Mayor was holding his formal Christmas dinner. They walked in and sat down, demanding to join the feast. The Bolshevik Revolution had a great effect on Lewis, and he studied Russian.

He also was involved with the Boy Scout movement, running a Scout troop, and authoring training booklets. He acted as a guide for outdoor holidays organised by the Holiday Fellowship. He often went to Switzerland, and took parties up the Matterhorn.

In the 1935 general election he stood unsuccessfully as Labour candidate for Great Yarmouth.

In 1936 the Left Book Club, started by the publisher Victor Gollancz, was very popular. Lewis quit his ministry in Ipswich to take on the task of building a national network of discussion groups. The groups brought together in a progressive movement intelligent, literate people who had not found rewarding political action in left-wing parties. Soon there were groups in every town. In effect, the Left Book Club and its groups had become a quasi–political party.

Having joined the Communist Party of Great Britain in the late 1930s, he became the editor of the British Marxist journal, Modern Quarterly, from 1946 to 1953. He was very interested in polemical writing, and authored many books and articles in a polemical vein on topics of philosophy, social issues, and Marxism. In one exchange of polemics, he took on the French Marxist philosopher Louis Althusser. Althusser's part of the exchange is the article "Reply to John Lewis".

"Reply to John Lewis" first appeared, translated by Grahame Lock, in two numbers of the theoretical and political journal of the Communist Party of Great Britain, Marxism Today, in October and November 1972. As Althusser himself noted: "'Reply': because, a few months earlier (in its January and February numbers of 1972), the same journal had published a long critical article by John Lewis (a British Communist philosopher known for his interventions in political-ideological questions) under the title: 'The Althusser Case'." (Note: This article was republished by Althusser in his Essays in Self-Criticism, now available in an online version.) In his own response to Althusser, the historian E.P. Thompson described Lewis as "the elderly guardian of the tablets of the British Communist Party’s ideological law."

== Miscellaneous ==
During the Second World War Lewis was a lecturer for the British Army, working with the Army Education Corps and the Army Bureau of Current Affairs and lecturing on, among other things, Britain's wartime ally, the Soviet Union.

In the mid-1930s, Lewis met Labour Party activist Betty Reid, and they married, moving together to London to work for the Left Book Club. She later became a full-time worker for the CPGB.

Lewis died on 12 February 1976.

== Works ==
- How To Run a Patrol Brown, Son & Ferguson 1914
- How To Run Wolf Cubs Brown, Son & Ferguson
- A Boy Scout Troop and How To Run It
- Wolf Cub Star Tests and How To Pass Them
- The Log of the Pioneers
- How To Run A Scout Camp Brown & Son 1918
- The Old Testament in the 20th Century Allen & Unwin 1923
- A Faith to Live By Williams and Norjak 1931
- Russia in 1932 Pamphlet Christian World 1932
- Christianity and the Social Revolution (Edited with Karl Polanyi & Donald Kitchin) Gollancz 1935
- Douglas Fallacies: A Critique of Social Credit Chapman & Hall 1935
- Textbook of Marxist Philosophy (Ed.) 1937
- Socialism and the Churches Pamphlet Gollancz 1937
- An Introduction to Philosophy Gollancz 1937 then fully revised Watts 1954
- The Case Against Pacifism Allen & Unwin 1939
- Marxism and Modern Idealism Pamphlet (Marxism Today Series) Lawrence & Wishart 1944
- The Philosophy of Betrayal (with Reginald Bishop) Pamphlet Russia Today Society 1945
- The Basis of Soviet Philosophy Pamphlet British Soviet Society 1947
- Marxism and the Irrationalists Lawrence & Wishart 1955
- Marxism and the Open Mind Routledge & Kegan Paul 1957
- Religions of the World Made Simple Made Simple Books 1958
- Science, Faith, and Scepticism Lawrence & Wishart 1959
- Anthropology Made Simple Doubleday (publisher) 1961
- Socialism and the Individual Lawrence & Wishart 1961
- History of Philosophy English University Press 1962 (second edition 1970)
- Man and Evolution Lawrence & Wishart 1962
- The Life and Teaching of Karl Marx Lawrence & Wishart 1965
- Bertrand Russell: Philosopher and Humanist Lawrence & Wishart 1968
- Naked Ape or Homo Sapiens? (with Bernard Towers) Garnstone 1969
- The Left Book Club: An Historical Record Gollancz 1970
- The Marxism of Marx Lawrence & Wishart 1972
- The Uniqueness of Man Lawrence & Wishart 1974
- Beyond Chance and Necessity (Ed.) Garnstone 1974
- Max Weber and Value-Free Sociology: A Marxist Critique Lawrence & Wishart 1975
