= Abercromby Professor of Archaeology =

Abercromby Professorship of Archaeology is a former chair at the University of Edinburgh. It was endowed in the will of John Abercromby, 5th Baron Abercromby (1841–1924), who left instructions to establish a chair in prehistoric archaeology at the university. With the new post having been advertised, it was filled for the first time in 1927 by V. Gordon Childe. Abercromby's will set out the focus of the chair and requirements of its holder: they should be knowledgeable of the prehistory of Europe and of the Near East, and that the professor would be actively involved in archaeology research.

== List of Abercromby Professors of Archaeology ==
- 1927–1946: V. Gordon Childe
- 1946–1977: Stuart Piggott
- 1977–2007: Dennis Harding
- 2007–2012: vacant
- 2012–2019: Ian Ralston
- 2019–2022: vacant
- 2022–2024: Manuel Fernández-Götz
