= V. Gordon Childe =

Australian archaeologist (1892–1957)

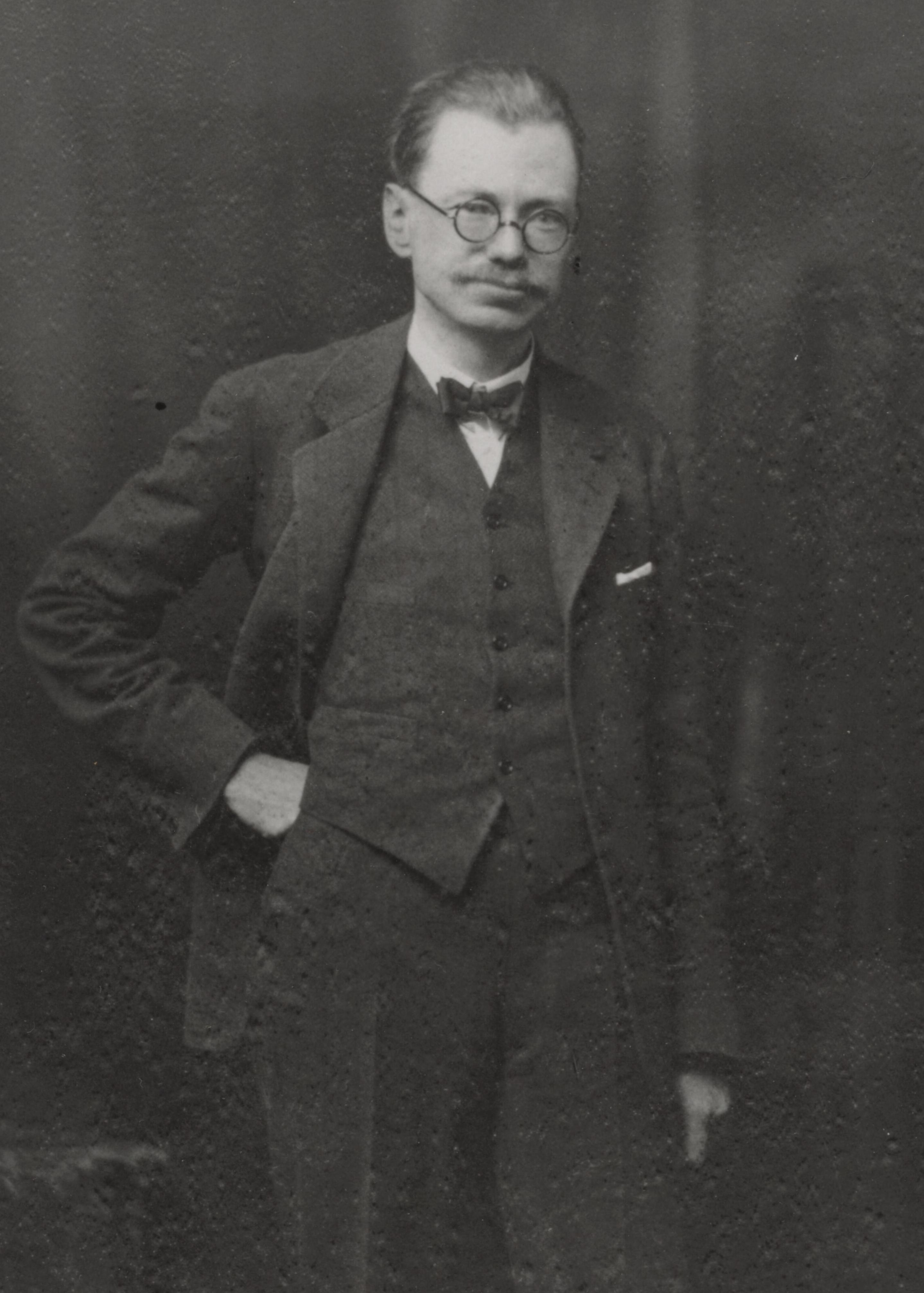
- Childe in the 1930s
- Born: Vere Gordon Childe; 14 April 1892; Sydney, Colony of New South Wales
- Died: 19 October 1957 (aged 65); Blackheath, New South Wales, Australia
- Occupations: Archaeologist; Philologist
- Known for: Excavating Skara Brae; Marxist archaeological theory

Academic background
- Education: University of Sydney; The Queen's College, Oxford

Academic work
- Doctoral students: Yun Po-sun

Vere Gordon Childe (14 April 1892 – 19 October 1957) was an Australian archaeologist who specialised in the study of European prehistory. He spent most of his life in the United Kingdom, working as an academic for the University of Edinburgh and then the Institute of Archaeology, London. He wrote 26 books during his career. Initially an early proponent of culture-historical archaeology, he later became the first exponent of Marxist archaeology in the Western world.

Born in Sydney to a middle-class English migrant family, Childe studied classics at the University of Sydney before moving to England to study classical archaeology at the University of Oxford. There, he embraced the socialist movement and campaigned against the First World War, viewing it as a conflict waged by competing imperialists to the detriment of Europe's working class. Returning to Australia in 1917, he was prevented from working in academia because of his socialist activism. Instead, he worked for the Labor Party as the private secretary of the politician John Storey.

Growing critical of Labor, he wrote an analysis of their policies and joined the radical labour organisation Industrial Workers of the World. Emigrating to London in 1921, he became librarian of the Royal Anthropological Institute and journeyed across Europe to pursue his research into the continent's prehistory, publishing his findings in academic papers and books. In doing so, he introduced the continental European concept of an archaeological culture—the idea that a recurring assemblage of artefacts demarcates a distinct cultural group—to the British archaeological community.

From 1927 to 1946, he worked as the Abercromby Professor of Archaeology at the University of Edinburgh, and then from 1947 to 1957 as the director of the Institute of Archaeology, London. During this period he oversaw the excavation of archaeological sites in Scotland and Northern Ireland, focusing on the society of Neolithic Orkney by excavating the settlement of Skara Brae and the chambered tombs of Maeshowe and Quoyness. In these decades, he published prolifically, producing excavation reports, journal articles, and books. With Stuart Piggott and Grahame Clark, he co-founded The Prehistoric Society in 1934, becoming its first president. Remaining a committed socialist, he embraced Marxism, and—rejecting culture-historical approaches—used Marxist ideas such as historical materialism as an interpretative framework for archaeological data. He became a sympathiser with the Soviet Union and visited the country on several occasions, although he grew sceptical of Soviet foreign policy following the Hungarian Revolution of 1956. His beliefs resulted in his being legally barred from entering the United States, despite receiving repeated invitations to lecture there. Upon retirement, he returned to Australia's Blue Mountains, where he committed suicide.

One of the best-known and most widely cited archaeologists of the twentieth century, Childe became known as the "great synthesizer" for his work integrating regional research with a broader picture of Near Eastern and European prehistory. He was also renowned for his emphasis on the role of revolutionary technological and economic developments in human society, such as the Neolithic Revolution and the Urban Revolution, reflecting the influence of Marxist ideas concerning societal development. Although many of his interpretations have since been discredited, he remains widely respected among archaeologists.

== Early life ==
=== Childhood: 1892–1910 ===
Childe was born on 14 April 1892 in Sydney. He was the only surviving child of the Reverend Stephen Henry Childe (1844–1923) and Harriet Eliza Childe, née Gordon (1853–1910), a middle-class couple of English descent. The son of an Anglican priest, Stephen Childe was ordained into the Church of England in 1867 after gaining a BA from the University of Cambridge. Becoming a teacher, in 1871 he married Mary Ellen Latchford, with whom he had five children. They moved to Australia in 1878, where Mary died. On 22 November 1886 Stephen married Harriet Gordon, an Englishwoman from a wealthy background who had moved to Australia as a child. Her father was Alexander Gordon. Gordon Childe was raised alongside five half-siblings at his father's palatial country house, the Chalet Fontenelle, in the township of Wentworth Falls in the Blue Mountains, west of Sydney. Rev. Childe worked as the minister for St. Thomas' Parish, but proved unpopular, arguing with his congregation and taking unscheduled holidays.

A sickly child, Gordon Childe was educated at home for several years, before receiving a private-school education in North Sydney. In 1907, he began attending Sydney Church of England Grammar School, gaining his Junior Matriculation in 1909 and Senior Matriculation in 1910. At school he studied ancient history, French, Greek, Latin, geometry, algebra, and trigonometry, achieving good marks in all subjects, but he was bullied because of his physical appearance and unathletic physique. In July 1910 his mother died; his father soon remarried. Childe's relationship with his father was strained, particularly following his mother's death, and they disagreed on religion and politics: the Reverend was a devout Christian and conservative, while his son was an atheist and socialist.

=== University in Sydney and Oxford: 1911–1917 ===
Childe studied for a degree in classics at the University of Sydney in 1911; although focusing on written sources, he first came across classical archaeology through the work of the archaeologists Heinrich Schliemann and Arthur Evans. At university, he became an active member of the debating society, at one point arguing that "socialism is desirable". Increasingly interested in socialism, he read the works of Karl Marx and Friedrich Engels, as well as those of the philosopher G. W. F. Hegel, whose dialectics heavily influenced Marxist theory.

At university, he became a great friend of fellow undergraduate and future judge and politician Herbert Vere Evatt, with whom he remained in lifelong contact. Ending his studies in 1913, Childe graduated the following year with various honours and prizes, including Professor Francis Anderson's prize for philosophy.

"My Oxford training was in the Classical tradition to which bronzes, terracottas and pottery (at least if painted) were respectable while stone and bone tools were banausic."

— Gordon Childe, 1957.

Wishing to continue his education, he gained a £200 Cooper Graduate Scholarship in Classics, allowing him to pay the tuition fees at Queen's College, part of the University of Oxford, England. He set sail for Britain aboard the SS Orsova in August 1914, shortly after the outbreak of World War I. At Queen's, Childe was entered for a diploma in classical archaeology followed by a Literae Humaniores degree, although he never completed the former. While there, he studied under John Beazley and Arthur Evans, the latter being Childe's supervisor. In 1915, he published his first academic paper, "On the Date and Origin of Minyan Ware", in the Journal of Hellenic Studies, and the following year produced his B.Litt. thesis, "The Influence of Indo-Europeans in Prehistoric Greece", displaying his interest in combining philological and archaeological evidence.

At Oxford he became actively involved with the socialist movement, antagonising the conservative university authorities. Becoming a noted member of the left-wing reformist Oxford University Fabian Society, he was there in 1915 when it changed its name to the Oxford University Socialist Society, following a split from the Fabian Society. His best friend and flatmate was Rajani Palme Dutt, a fervent socialist and Marxist. The pair often got drunk and tested each other's knowledge about classical history late at night. With Britain in the midst of World War I, many British-based socialists refused to enlist in the military despite the government-mandated conscription. They believed the ruling classes of Europe's imperialist nations were waging the war for their own interests at the expense of the working classes; these socialists thought class war was the only conflict they should be concerned with. Dutt was imprisoned for refusing to fight, and Childe campaigned for the release of both him and other socialists and pacifist conscientious objectors. Childe was never required to enlist in the military, most likely due to his poor health and eyesight. His anti-war sentiments concerned the authorities; the intelligence agency MI5 opening a file on him, his mail was intercepted, and he was kept under observation.

=== Early career in Australia: 1918–1921 ===
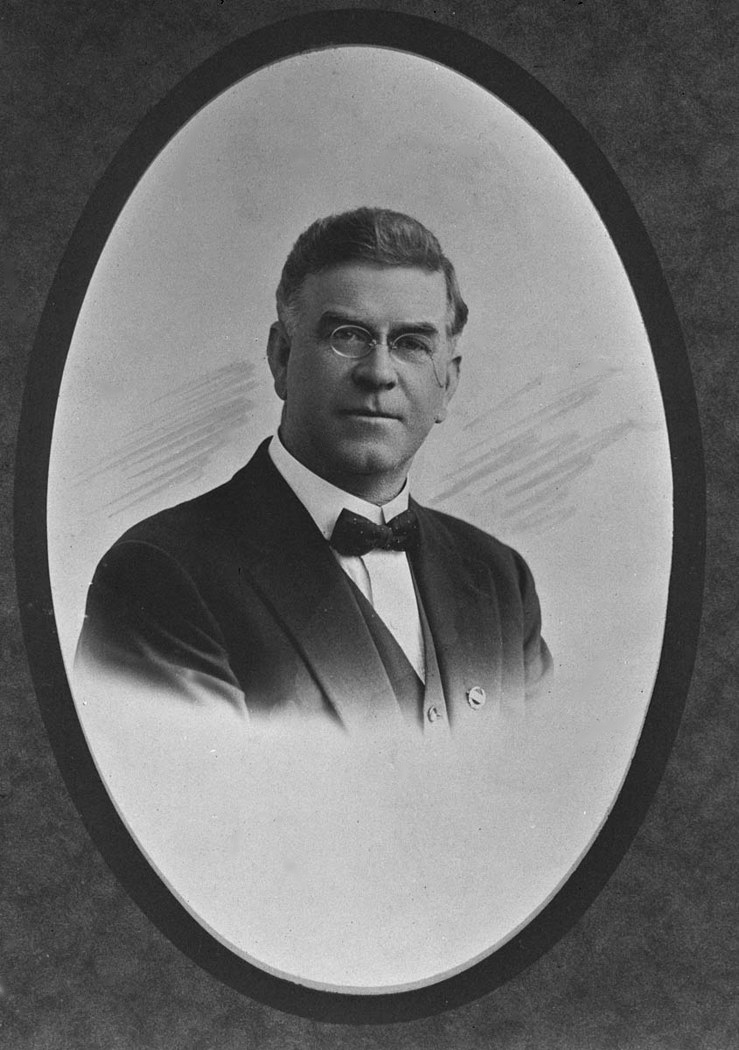
From 1919 to 1921, Childe worked for the leftist politician John Storey as his personal assistant.

Childe returned to Australia in August 1917. As a known socialist agitator, he was placed under surveillance by the security services, who intercepted his mail. In 1918 he became senior resident tutor at St Andrew's College, Sydney University, joining Sydney's socialist and anti-conscription movement. In Easter 1918 he spoke at the Third Inter-State Peace Conference, an event organised by the Australian Union of Democratic Control for the Avoidance of War, a group opposed to Prime Minister Billy Hughes's plans to introduce conscription. The conference had a prominent socialist emphasis; its report argued that the best hope to end international war was the "abolition of the Capitalist System". News of Childe's participation reached the Principal of St Andrew's College, who forced Childe to resign despite much opposition from staff.

Staff members secured him work as a tutor in ancient history in the Department of Tutorial Classes, but the university chancellor William Cullen feared that he would promote socialism to students and fired him. The leftist community condemned this as an infringement of Childe's civil rights, and the centre-left politicians William McKell and T.J. Smith raised the issue in the Parliament of Australia. Moving to Maryborough, Queensland, in October 1918, Childe took up employment teaching Latin at the Maryborough Boys Grammar School, where his students included P. R. Stephensen. Here, too, his political affiliations became known, and he was subject to an opposition campaign from local conservative groups and the Maryborough Chronicle, resulting in abuse from some pupils. He soon resigned.

Realising he would be barred from an academic career by the university authorities, Childe sought employment within the leftist movement. In August 1919, he became private secretary and speech writer to the politician John Storey, a prominent member of the centre-left Labor Party then in opposition to New South Wales' Nationalist Party government. Representing the Sydney suburb of Balmain on the New South Wales Legislative Assembly, Storey became state premier in 1920 when Labor achieved electoral victory. Working within the Labor Party allowed Childe greater insight into its workings; the deeper his involvement, the more he became critical of Labor, believing that once in political office they betrayed their socialist ideals and moved to a centrist, pro-capitalist stance. He joined the radical leftist Industrial Workers of the World, which at the time was banned in Australia. In 1921 Storey sent Childe to London to keep the British press updated about developments in New South Wales, but Storey died in December and an ensuing New South Wales election restored a Nationalist government under George Fuller's premiership. Fuller thought Childe's job unnecessary, and in early 1922 terminated his employment.

=== London and early books: 1922–1926 ===
Unable to find an academic job in Australia, Childe remained in Britain, renting a room in Bloomsbury, Central London, and spending much time studying at the British Museum and the Royal Anthropological Institute library. An active member of London's socialist movement, he associated with leftists at the 1917 Club in Gerrard Street, Soho. He befriended members of the Marxist Communist Party of Great Britain (CPGB) and contributed to their publication, Labour Monthly, but had not yet openly embraced Marxism. Having earned a good reputation as a prehistorian, he was invited to other parts of Europe to study prehistoric artefacts. In 1922 he travelled to Vienna to examine unpublished material about the painted Neolithic pottery from Schipenitz, Bukovina, held in the Prehistoric Department of the Natural History Museum; he published his findings in the 1923 volume of the Journal of the Royal Anthropological Institute. Childe used this excursion to visit museums in Czechoslovakia and Hungary, bringing them to the attention of British archaeologists in a 1922 article in Man. After returning to London, in 1922 Childe became a private secretary for three Members of Parliament, including John Hope Simpson and Frank Gray, both members of the centre-left Liberal Party. Supplementing this income, Childe worked as a translator for the publishers Kegan Paul, Trench, Trübner & Co. and occasionally lectured in prehistory at the London School of Economics.

"As the [Australian] Labour Party, starting with a band of inspired Socialists, degenerated into a vast machine for capturing political power, but did not know how to use that political power except for the profit of individuals; so the [One Big Union] will, in all likelihood, become just a gigantic apparatus for the glorification of a few bosses. Such is the history of all Labour organizations in Australia, and that is not because they are Australian, but because they are Labour."

— Gordon Childe, How Labour Governs, 1923.

In 1923 the London Labour Company published his first book, How Labour Governs. Examining the Australian Labor Party and its connections to the Australian labour movement, it reflects Childe's disillusionment with the party, arguing that once elected, its politicians abandoned their socialist ideals in favour of personal comfort. Childe's biographer Sally Green noted that How Labour Governs was of particular significance at the time because it was published just as the British Labour Party was emerging as a major player in British politics, threatening the two-party dominance of the Conservatives and Liberals; in 1923 Labour formed their first government. Childe planned a sequel expanding on his ideas, but it was never published.

In May 1923 he visited the museums in Lausanne, Bern, and Zürich to study their prehistoric artefact collections; that year he became a member of the Royal Anthropological Institute. In 1925, he became the institute's librarian, one of the only archaeological jobs available in Britain, through which he began cementing connections with scholars across Europe. His job made him well known in Britain's small archaeological community; he developed a great friendship with O. G. S. Crawford, the archaeological officer to the Ordnance Survey, influencing Crawford's move toward socialism and Marxism.

In 1925, Kegan Paul, Trench, Trübner & Co published Childe's second book, The Dawn of European Civilisation, in which he synthesised the data about European prehistory that he had been exploring for several years. An important work, it was released when there were few professional archaeologists across Europe and most museums focused on their locality; The Dawn was a rare example that looked at the larger picture across the continent. Its importance was also due to the fact that it introduced the concept of the archaeological culture into Britain from continental scholarship, thereby aiding in the development of culture-historical archaeology. Childe later said the book "aimed at distilling from archaeological remains a preliterate substitute for the conventional politico-military history with cultures, instead of statesmen, as actors, and migrations in place of battles". In 1926 he published a successor, The Aryans: A Study of Indo-European Origins, exploring the theory that civilisation diffused northward and westward into Europe from the Near East via an Indo-European linguistic group known as the Aryans; with the ensuing racial use of the term "Aryan" by the German Nazi Party, Childe avoided mention of the book. In these works, Childe accepted a moderate version of diffusionism, the idea that cultural developments diffuse from one place to others, rather than being independently developed in many places. In contrast to the hyper-diffusionism of Grafton Elliot Smith, Childe suggested that although most cultural traits spread from one society to another, it was possible for the same traits to develop independently in different places.

== Later life ==
=== Abercromby Professor of Archaeology: 1927–1946 ===
"Because the early Hindus and Persians did really call themselves Aryans, this term was adopted by some nineteenth-century philologists to designate the speakers of the 'parent tongue'. It is now applied scientifically only to the Hindus, Iranian peoples and the rulers of Mitanni whose linguistic ancestors spoke closely related dialects and even worshipped common deities. As used by Nazis and anti-semites generally, the term 'Aryan' means as little as the words 'Bolshie' and 'Red' in the mouths of crusted tories."

— Gordon Childe criticising the Nazi conception of an Aryan race, What Happened in History, 1942.

In 1927, the University of Edinburgh offered Childe the post of Abercromby Professor of Archaeology, a new position established in the bequest of the prehistorian Lord Abercromby. Although sad to leave London, Childe took the job, moving to Edinburgh in September 1927. Aged 35, Childe became the "only academic prehistorian in a teaching post in Scotland". Many Scottish archaeologists disliked Childe, regarding him as an outsider with no specialism in Scottish prehistory; he wrote to a friend that "I live here in an atmosphere of hatred and envy". He nevertheless made friends in Edinburgh, including archaeologists like W. Lindsay Scott, Alexander Curle, J. G. Callender, and Walter Grant, as well as non-archaeologists like the physicist Charles Galton Darwin, becoming godfather to Darwin's youngest son. Initially lodging at Liberton, he moved into the semi-residential Hotel de Vere on Eglinton Crescent.

At Edinburgh University, Childe focused on research rather than teaching. He was reportedly kind to his students but had difficulty talking to large audiences; many students were confused that his BSc degree course in archaeology was structured counter-chronologically, dealing with the more recent Iron Age first before progressing backward to the Palaeolithic. Founding the Edinburgh League of Prehistorians, he took his more enthusiastic students on excavations and invited guest lecturers to visit. An early proponent of experimental archaeology, he involved his students in his experiments; in 1937 he used this method to investigate the vitrification process evident at several Iron Age forts in northern Britain. His first student to get professional employment in archaeology was Margaret E. B. Simpson, in 1930, who was also the first women professional archaeologist in Scotland.

Childe regularly travelled to London to visit friends, among whom was Stuart Piggott, another influential British archaeologist who succeeded Childe as Edinburgh's Abercromby Professor. Another friend was Grahame Clark, whom Childe befriended and encouraged in his research. The trio were elected onto the committee of the Prehistoric Society of East Anglia. At Clark's suggestion, in 1935 they used their influence to convert it into a nationwide organisation, the Prehistoric Society, of which Childe was elected president. Membership of the group grew rapidly; in 1935 it had 353 members and by 1938 it had 668.

Childe spent much time in continental Europe and attended many conferences there, having learned several European languages. In 1935, he first visited the Soviet Union, spending 12 days in Leningrad and Moscow; impressed with the socialist state, he was particularly interested in the social role of Soviet archaeology. Returning to Britain, he became a vocal Soviet sympathiser and avidly read the CPGB's Daily Worker, although was heavily critical of certain Soviet policies, particularly the Molotov–Ribbentrop Pact with Nazi Germany. His socialist convictions led to an early denunciation of European fascism, and he was outraged by the Nazi co-option of prehistoric archaeology to glorify their own conceptions of an Aryan racial heritage. Supportive of the British government's decision to fight the fascist powers in the Second World War, he thought it probable that he was on a Nazi blacklist and made the decision to drown himself in a canal should the Nazis conquer Britain. Though opposing fascist Germany and Italy, he also criticised the imperialist, capitalist governments of the United Kingdom and United States: he repeatedly described the latter as being full of "loathsome fascist hyenas". This did not prevent him from visiting the U.S. In 1936 he addressed a Conference of Arts and Sciences marking the tercentenary of Harvard University; there, the university awarded him an honorary Doctor of Letters degree. He returned in 1939, lecturing at Harvard, the University of California, Berkeley, and the University of Pennsylvania.

==== Excavations ====
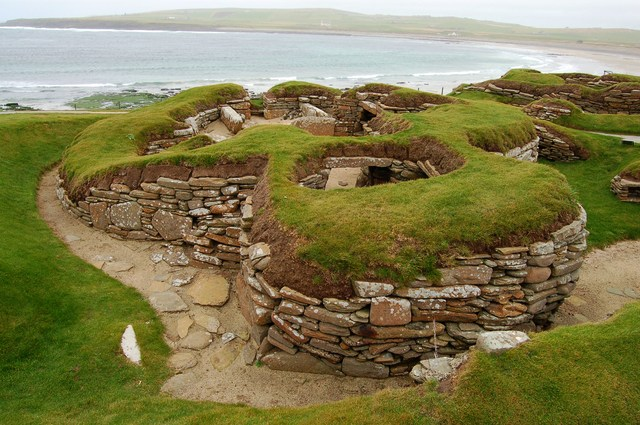
Neolithic dwellings at Skara Brae in Orkney, the site excavated by Childe 1927–30

Childe's university position meant he was obliged to undertake archaeological excavations, something he loathed and believed he did poorly. Students agreed, but recognised his "genius for interpreting evidence". Unlike many contemporaries, he was scrupulous with writing up and publishing his findings, producing almost annual reports for the Proceedings of the Society of Antiquaries of Scotland and, unusually, ensuring that he acknowledged the help of every digger.

His best-known excavation was undertaken from 1928 to 1930 at Skara Brae in the Orkney Islands. Having uncovered a well-preserved Neolithic village, in 1931 he published the excavation results in a book titled Skara Brae. He made an error of interpretation, erroneously attributing the site to the Iron Age. During the excavation, Childe got on particularly well with the locals; for them, he was "every inch the professor" because of his eccentric appearance and habits. In 1932, Childe, collaborating with the anthropologist C. Daryll Forde, excavated two Iron Age hillforts at Earn's Hugh on the Berwickshire coast, while in June 1935 he excavated a promontory fort at Larriban near to Knocksoghey in Northern Ireland. Together with Wallace Thorneycroft, another Fellow of the Society of Antiquaries of Scotland, Childe excavated two vitrified Iron Age forts in Scotland, at Finavon, Angus (1933–34) and at Rahoy, Argyllshire (1936–37). In 1938, he and Walter Grant oversaw excavations at the Neolithic settlement of Rinyo; their investigation ceased during the Second World War, but resumed in 1946.

==== Publications ====
Childe continued writing and publishing books on archaeology, beginning with a series of works following on from The Dawn of European Civilisation and The Aryans by compiling and synthesising data from across Europe. First was The Most Ancient Near East (1928), which assembled information from across Mesopotamia and India, setting a background from which the spread of farming and other technologies into Europe could be understood. This was followed by The Danube in Prehistory (1929) which examined the archaeology along the Danube river, recognising it as the natural boundary dividing the Near East from Europe; Childe believed it was via the Danube that new technologies travelled westward. Although Childe had used culture-historical approaches in earlier publications, The Danube in Prehistory was his first publication to provide a specific definition of the concept of an archaeological culture, revolutionising the theoretical approach of British archaeology.

"We find certain types of remains—pots, implements, ornaments, burial rites, house forms—constantly recurring together. Such a complex of regularly associated traits we shall term a 'cultural group' or just a 'culture'. We assume that such a complex is the material expression of what today would be called a people."

— Gordon Childe, The Danube in Prehistory, 1929.

Childe's next book, The Bronze Age (1930), dealt with the Bronze Age in Europe, and displayed his increasing adoption of Marxist theory as a means of understanding how society functioned and changed. He believed metal was the first indispensable article of commerce, and that metal-smiths were therefore full-time professionals who lived off the social surplus. In 1933, Childe travelled to Asia, visiting Iraq—a place he thought "great fun"—and India, which he felt was "detestable" due to the hot weather and extreme poverty. Touring archaeological sites in the two countries, he opined that much of what he had written in The Most Ancient Near East was outdated, going on to produce New Light on the Most Ancient Near East (1935), in which he applied his Marxist-influenced ideas about the economy to his conclusions.

After publishing Prehistory of Scotland (1935), Childe produced one of the defining books of his career, Man Makes Himself (1936). Influenced by Marxist views of history, Childe argued that the usual distinction between (pre-literate) prehistory and (literate) history was a false dichotomy and human society has progressed through a series of technological, economic, and social revolutions. These included the Neolithic Revolution, when hunter-gatherers began settling in permanent farming communities, through to the Urban Revolution, when society moved from small towns to the first cities, and up to more recent times, when the Industrial Revolution changed the nature of production.

After the outbreak of the Second World War, Childe was unable to travel across Europe, instead focusing on writing Prehistoric Communities of the British Isles (1940). Childe's pessimism regarding the war's outcome led him to believe that "European civilization—capitalist and Stalinist alike—was irrevocably headed for a Dark Age". In this state of mind he produced a sequel to Man Makes Himself titled What Happened in History (1942), an account of human history from the Palaeolithic through to the fall of the Roman Empire. Although Oxford University Press offered to publish the work, he released it through Penguin Books because they could sell it at a cheaper price, something he believed pivotal in providing knowledge for those he called "the masses". This was followed by two short works, Progress and Archaeology (1944) and The Story of Tools (1944), the latter an explicitly Marxist text written for the Young Communist League.

=== Institute of Archaeology, London: 1946–1956 ===
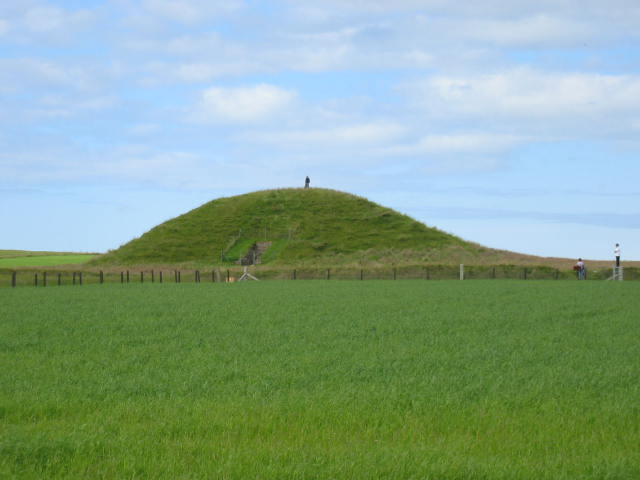
The Neolithic passage tomb of Maes Howe on Mainland, Orkney, excavated by Childe 1954–55

In 1946, Childe left Edinburgh to take up the position as director and professor of European prehistory at the Institute of Archaeology (IOA) in London. Anxious to return to London, he had kept silent over his disapproval of government policies so he would not be prevented from getting the job. He took up residence in the Isokon building near to Hampstead.

Located in St John's Lodge in the Inner Circle of Regent's Park, the IOA was founded in 1937, largely by the archaeologist Mortimer Wheeler, but until 1946 relied primarily on volunteer lecturers. Childe's relationship with the conservative Wheeler was strained, for their personalities were very different; Wheeler was an extrovert who pursued the limelight, was an efficient administrator, and was intolerant of others' shortcomings, while Childe lacked administrative skill, and was tolerant of others. Childe was popular among the institute's students, who saw him as a kindly eccentric; they commissioned a bust of Childe from Marjorie Maitland Howard. His lecturing was nevertheless considered poor, as he often mumbled and walked into an adjacent room to find something while continuing to talk. He further confused his students by referring to the socialist states of eastern Europe by their full official titles, and by referring to towns by their Slavonic names rather than the names with which they were better known in English. He was deemed better at giving tutorials and seminars, where he devoted more time to interacting with his students. As Director, Childe was not obliged to excavate, though he did undertake projects at the Orkney Neolithic burial tombs of Quoyness (1951) and Maes Howe (1954–55).

In 1949, he and Crawford resigned as fellows of the Society of Antiquaries. They did so to protest the selection of James Mann—keeper of the Tower of London's armouries—as the society's president, believing Wheeler (a professional archaeologist) was a better choice. Childe joined the editorial board of the periodical Past & Present, founded by Marxist historians in 1952. During the early 1950s, he also became a board member for The Modern Quarterly—later The Marxist Quarterly—working alongside the board's chairman Rajani Palme Dutt, his best friend and flatmate from his Oxford days. He authored occasional articles for Palme Dutt's socialist journal, the Labour Monthly, but disagreed with him over the Hungarian Revolution of 1956; Palme Dutt defended the Soviet Union's decision to quash the revolution using military force, but Childe, like many Western socialists, strongly opposed it. The event made Childe abandon faith in the Soviet leadership, but not in socialism or Marxism. He retained a love of the Soviet Union, having visiting on multiple occasions; he was also involved with a CPGB satellite body, the Society for Cultural Relations with the USSR, and served as president of its National History and Archaeology Section from the early 1950s until his death.

In April 1956, Childe was awarded the Gold Medal of the Society of Antiquaries for his services to archaeology. He was invited to lecture in the United States on multiple occasions, by Robert Braidwood, William Duncan Strong, and Leslie White, but the U.S. State Department barred him from entering the country due to his Marxist beliefs. While working at the institute, Childe continued writing and publishing books dealing with archaeology. History (1947) promoted a Marxist view of the past and reaffirmed Childe's belief that prehistory and literate history must be viewed together, while Prehistoric Migrations (1950) displayed his views on moderate diffusionism. In 1946 he also published a paper in the Southwestern Journal of Anthropology. This was "Archaeology and Anthropology", which argued that the disciplines of archaeology and anthropology should be used in tandem, an approach that would be widely accepted in the decades following his death.

=== Retirement and death: 1956–1957 ===
In mid-1956, Childe retired as IOA director a year prematurely. European archaeology had rapidly expanded during the 1950s, leading to increasing specialisation and making the synthesising that Childe was known for increasingly difficult. That year, the institute was moving to Gordon Square, Bloomsbury, and Childe wanted to give his successor, W. F. Grimes, a fresh start in the new surroundings. To commemorate his achievements, the Proceedings of the Prehistoric Society published a Festschrift edition on the last day of his directorship containing contributions from friends and colleagues all over the world, something that touched Childe deeply. Upon his retirement, he told many friends he planned to return to Australia, visit his relatives, and commit suicide; he was terrified of becoming old, senile, and a burden on society, and suspected he had cancer. Subsequent commentators suggested that a core reason for his suicidal desires was a loss of faith in Marxism following the Hungarian Revolution and Nikita Khrushchev's denunciation of Joseph Stalin, although Bruce Trigger dismissed this explanation, noting that while Childe was critical of Soviet foreign policy, he never saw the state and Marxism as synonymous.

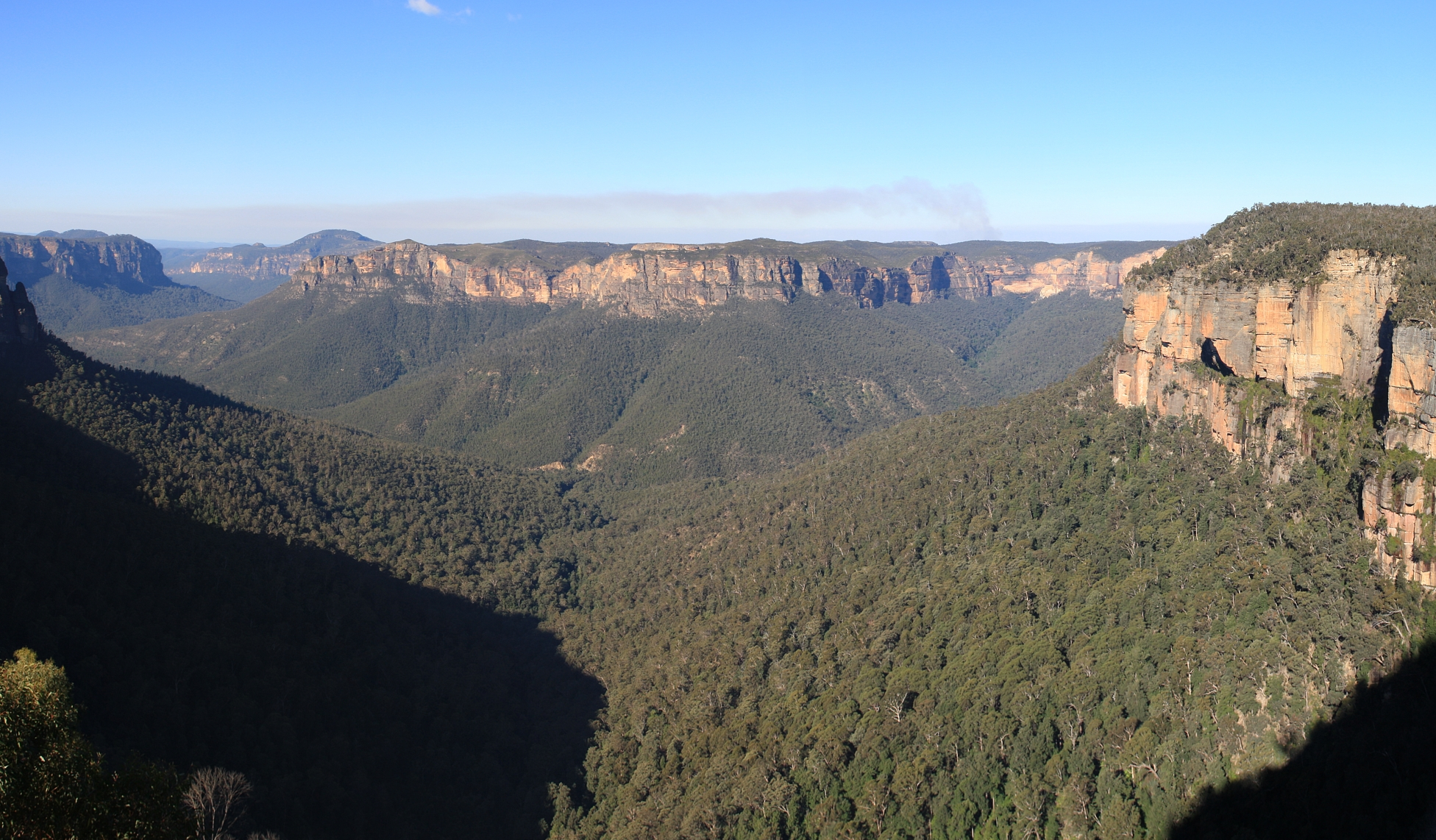
A view of Grose Valley from Govetts Leap, the site where Childe chose to end his life

Sorting out his affairs, Childe donated most of his library and all of his estate to the institute. After a February 1957 holiday visiting archaeological sites in Gibraltar and Spain, he sailed to Australia, reaching Sydney on his 65th birthday. Here, the University of Sydney, which had once barred him from working there, awarded him an honorary degree. He travelled around the country for six months, visiting family members and old friends, but was unimpressed by Australian society, believing it reactionary, increasingly suburban, and poorly educated. Looking into Australian prehistory, he found it a profitable field for research, and lectured to archaeological and leftist groups on this and other topics, taking to Australian radio to criticise academic racism towards Indigenous Australians.

Writing personal letters to many friends, he sent one to Grimes, requesting that it not be opened until 1968. In it, he described how he feared old age and stated his intention to take his own life, remarking that "life ends best when one is happy and strong". On 19 October 1957, Childe went to the area of Govett's Leap in Blackheath, an area of the Blue Mountains where he had grown up. Leaving his hat, spectacles, compass, pipe, and Mackintosh raincoat on the cliffs, he fell 1000 feet (300 m) to his death. A coroner ruled his death as accidental, but his death was recognised as suicide when his letter to Grimes was published in the 1980s. His remains were cremated at the Northern Suburbs Crematorium, and his name added to a small family plaque in the Crematorium Gardens. Following his death, an "unprecedented" level of tributes and memorials were issued by the archaeological community, all, according to Ruth Tringham, testifying to his status as Europe's "greatest prehistorian and a wonderful human being".

== Archaeological theory ==
"By far the most important source [of Childe's thinking], especially in the early stages of his career, was the highly developed western European archaeology, which had been established as a scientific discipline for over a century. His research and publications took the form mainly of contributions to the development of that tradition. His thinking was also influenced, however, by ideas derived from Soviet archaeology and American anthropology as well as from more remote disciplines. He had a subsidiary interest in philosophy and politics, and was more concerned than were most archaeologists of his time with justifying the social value of archaeology."

— Bruce Trigger, 1980.

The biographer Sally Green noted that Childe's beliefs were "never dogmatic, always idiosyncratic" and "continually changing throughout his life". His theoretical approach blended together Marxism, diffusionism, and functionalism. Childe was critical of the evolutionary archaeology dominant during the nineteenth century. He believed archaeologists who adhered to it placed a greater emphasis on artefacts than on the humans who had made them. Like most archaeologists in Western Europe and the United States at the time, Childe did not regard humans as naturally inventive or inclined to change; thus, he tended to perceive social change in terms of diffusion and migration rather than internal development or cultural evolution.

During the decades in which Childe was working, most archaeologists adhered to the three-age system first developed by the Danish antiquarian Christian Jürgensen Thomsen. This system rested upon an evolutionary chronology that divided prehistory into the Stone Age, Bronze Age, and Iron Age, but Childe highlighted that many of the world's societies were still effectively Stone Age in their technology. He nevertheless saw it as a useful model for analysing socio-economic development when combined with a Marxist framework. He therefore used technological criteria for dividing up prehistory into three ages, but instead used economic criteria for sub-dividing the Stone Age into the Palaeolithic and Neolithic, rejecting the concept of the Mesolithic as useless. Informally, he adopted the division of past societies into the framework of "savagery", "barbarism", and "civilisation" that Engels had employed.

=== Culture-historical archaeology ===
In the early part of his career, Childe was a proponent of the culture-historical approach to archaeology, coming to be seen as one of its "founders and chief exponents". Culture-historical archaeology revolved around the concept of "culture", which it had adopted from anthropology. This was "a major turning point in the history of the discipline", allowing archaeologists to look at the past through a spatial dynamic rather than a temporal one. Childe adopted the concept of "culture" from the German philologist and archaeologist Gustaf Kossinna, although this influence might have been mediated through Leon Kozłowski, a Polish archaeologist who had adopted Kossina's ideas and who had a close association with Childe. Trigger expressed the view that while adopting Kossina's basic concept, Childe displayed "no awareness" of the "racist connotations" Kossina had given it.

Childe's adherence to the culture-historical model is apparent in three of his books—The Dawn of European Civilisation (1925), The Aryans (1926) and The Most Ancient East (1928)—but in none of these does he define what he means by "culture". Only later, in The Danube in Prehistory (1929), did Childe give "culture" a specifically archaeological definition. In this book, he defined a "culture" as a set of "regularly associated traits" in the material culture—i.e. "pots, implements, ornaments, burial rites, house forms"—that recur across a given area. He said that in this respect a "culture" was the archaeological equivalent of a "people". Childe's use of the term was non-racial; he considered a "people" to be a social grouping, not a biological race. He opposed the equation of archaeological cultures with biological races—as various nationalists across Europe were doing at the time—and vociferously criticised Nazi uses of archaeology, arguing that the Jewish people were not a distinct biological race but a socio-cultural grouping. In 1935, he suggested that culture worked as a "living functioning organism" and emphasised the adaptive potential of material culture; in this he was influenced by anthropological functionalism. Childe accepted that archaeologists defined "cultures" based on a subjective selection of material criteria; this view was later widely adopted by archaeologists like Colin Renfrew.

Later in his career, Childe tired of culture-historical archaeology. By the late 1940s he was questioning the utility of "culture" as an archaeological concept and thus the basic validity of the culture-historical approach. McNairn suggested that this was because the term "culture" had become popular across the social sciences in reference to all learned modes of behaviour, and not just material culture as Childe had done. By the 1940s, Childe was doubtful as to whether a certain archaeological assemblage or "culture" really reflected a social group who had other unifying traits, such as a shared language. In the 1950s, Childe was comparing the role culture-historical archaeology had among prehistorians to the place of the traditional politico-military approach among historians.

=== Marxist archaeology ===
"To me Marxism means effectively a way of approach to and a methodological device for the interpretation of historical and archaeological material and I accept it because and in so far as it works. To the average communist and anti-communist alike ... Marxism means a set of dogmas—the words of the master from which as among mediaeval schoolmen, one must deduce truths which the scientist hopes to infer from experiment and observation."

— Gordon Childe, in letter to Rajani Palme Dutt, 1938.

Childe has typically been seen as a Marxist archaeologist, being the first archaeologist in the West to use Marxist theory in his work. Marxist archaeology emerged in the Soviet Union in 1929, when the archaeologist Vladislav I. Ravdonikas published a report titled "For a Soviet History of Material Culture". Criticising the archaeological discipline as inherently bourgeois and therefore anti-socialist, Ravdonikas's report called for a pro-socialist, Marxist approach to archaeology as part of the academic reforms instituted under Joseph Stalin's rule. It was during the mid-1930s, around the time of his first visit to the Soviet Union, that Childe began to make explicit reference to Marxism in his work.

Many archaeologists have been profoundly influenced by Marxism's socio-political ideas. As a materialist philosophy, Marxism emphasises the idea that material things are more important than ideas, and that the social conditions of a given period are the result of the existing material conditions, or mode of production. Thus, a Marxist interpretation foregrounds the social context of any technological development or change. Marxist ideas also emphasise the biased nature of scholarship, each scholar having their own entrenched beliefs and class loyalties; Marxism thus argues that intellectuals cannot divorce their scholarly thinking from political action. Green said that Childe accepted "Marxist views on a model of the past" because they offer "a structural analysis of culture in terms of economy, sociology and ideology, and a principle for cultural change through economy". McNairn noted that Marxism was "a major intellectual force in Childe's thought", while Trigger said Childe identified with Marx's theories "both emotionally and intellectually".

Childe said he used Marxist ideas when interpreting the past "because and in so far as it works"; he criticised many fellow Marxists for treating the socio-political theory as a set of dogmas. Childe's Marxism often differed from the Marxism of his contemporaries, both because he made reference to the original texts of Hegel, Marx, and Engels rather than later interpretations and because he was selective in using their writings. McNairn considered Childe's Marxism "an individual interpretation" that differed from "popular or orthodox" Marxism; Trigger called him a "a creative Marxist thinker"; Gathercole thought that while Childe's "debt to Marx was quite evident", his "attitude to Marxism was at times ambivalent". The Marxist historian Eric Hobsbawm later described Childe as "the most original English Marxist writer from the days of my youth". Aware that in the context of the Cold War his affiliation with Marxism could prove dangerous for him, Childe sought to make his Marxist ideas more palatable to his readership. In his archaeological writings, he sparingly made direct reference to Marx. There is a distinction in his published works from the latter part of his life between those that are explicitly Marxist and those in which Marxist ideas and influences are less obvious. Many of Childe's fellow British archaeologists did not take his adherence to Marxism seriously, regarding it as something which he did for shock value.

"The Marxist view of history and prehistory is admittedly material determinist and materialist. But its determinism does not mean mechanism. The Marxist account is in fact termed 'dialectical materialism'. It is deterministic in as much as it assumes that the historical process is not a mere succession of inexplicable or miraculous happenings, but that all the constituent events are interrelated and form an intelligible pattern."

— Gordon Childe, 1979 [1949].

Childe was influenced by Soviet archaeology but remained critical of it, disapproving of how the Soviet government encouraged the country's archaeologists to assume their conclusions before analysing their data. He was also critical of what he saw as the sloppy approach to typology in Soviet archaeology. As a moderate diffusionist, Childe was heavily critical of the "Marrist" trend in Soviet archaeology, based on the theories of the Georgian philologist Nicholas Marr, which rejected diffusionism in favour of unilinear evolutionism. In his view, it "cannot be un-Marxian" to understand the spread of domesticated plants, animals, and ideas through diffusionism. Childe did not publicly air these criticisms of his Soviet colleagues, perhaps so as not to offend communist friends or to provide ammunition for right-wing archaeologists. Instead, he publicly praised the Soviet system of archaeology and heritage management, contrasting it favourably with Britain's because it encouraged collaboration rather than competition between archaeologists. After first visiting the country in 1935, he returned in 1945, 1953, and 1956, befriending many Soviet archaeologists, but shortly before his suicide sent a letter to the Soviet archaeological community saying he was "extremely disappointed" they had methodologically fallen behind Western Europe and North America.

Other Marxists—such as George Derwent Thomson and Neil Faulkner—argued that Childe's archaeological work was not truly Marxist because he failed to take into account class struggle as an instrument of social change, a core tenet of Marxist thought. While class struggle was not a factor Childe considered in his archaeological work, he accepted that historians and archaeologists typically interpreted the past through their own class interests, arguing that most of his contemporaries produced studies with an innate bourgeois agenda. Childe further diverged from orthodox Marxism by not employing dialectics in his methodology. He also denied Marxism's ability to predict the future development of human society, and—unlike many other Marxists—did not consider humanity's progress into pure communism inevitable, instead opining that society could fossilise or become extinct.

=== Neolithic and Urban Revolutions ===
Influenced by Marxism, Childe argued that society experienced widescale changes in relatively short periods of time, citing the Industrial Revolution as a modern example. This idea was absent from his earliest work; in studies like The Dawn of European Civilisation he talked of societal change as "transition" rather than "revolution". In writings from the early 1930s, such as New Light on the Most Ancient East, he began to describe social change using the term "revolution", although had yet to fully develop these ideas. At this point, the term "revolution" had gained Marxist associations due to Russia's October Revolution of 1917. Childe introduced his ideas about "revolutions" in a 1935 presidential address to the Prehistoric Society. Presenting this concept as part of his functional-economic interpretation of the three-age system, he argued that a "Neolithic Revolution" initiated the Neolithic era, and that other revolutions marked the start of the Bronze and Iron Ages. The following year, in Man Makes Himself, he combined these Bronze and Iron Age Revolutions into a singular "Urban Revolution", which corresponded largely to the anthropologist Lewis H. Morgan's concept of "civilization".

For Childe, the Neolithic Revolution was a period of radical change, in which humans—who were then hunter-gatherers—began cultivating plants and breeding animals for food, allowing for greater control of the food supply and population growth. He believed the Urban Revolution was largely caused by the development of bronze metallurgy, and in a 1950 paper proposed ten traits that he believed were present in the oldest cities: they were larger than earlier settlements, they contained full-time craft specialists, the surplus was collected together and given to a god or king, they witnessed monumental architecture, there was an unequal distribution of social surplus, writing was invented, the sciences developed, naturalistic art developed, trade with foreign areas increased, and the state organisation was based on residence rather than kinship. Childe believed the Urban Revolution had a negative side, in that it led to increased social stratification into classes and oppression of the majority by a power elite. Not all archaeologists adopted Childe's framework of understanding human societal development as a series of transformational "revolutions"; many believed the term "revolution" was misleading because the processes of agricultural and urban development were gradual transformations.

=== Influence on processual and post-processual archaeology ===
Through his work, Childe contributed to two of the major theoretical movements in Anglo-American archaeology that developed in the decades after his death, processualism and post-processualism. The former emerged in the late 1950s, emphasised the idea that archaeology should be a branch of anthropology, sought the discovery of universal laws about society, and believed that archaeology could ascertain objective information about the past. The latter emerged as a reaction to processualism in the late 1970s, rejecting the idea that archaeology had access to objective information about the past and emphasising the subjectivity of all interpretation.

The processual archaeologist Colin Renfrew described Childe as "one of the fathers of processual thought" due to his "development of economic and social themes in prehistory", an idea echoed by Faulkner. Trigger argued that Childe's work foreshadowed processual thought in two ways: by emphasising the role of change in societal development, and by adhering to a strictly materialist view of the past. Both of these arose from Childe's Marxism. Despite this connection, most American processualists ignored Childe's work, seeing him as a particularist who was irrelevant to their search for generalised laws of societal behaviour. In keeping with Marxist thought, Childe did not agree that such generalised laws exist, believing behaviour is not universal but conditioned by socio-economic factors. Peter Ucko, one of Childe's successors as director of the Institute of Archaeology, highlighted that Childe accepted the subjectivity of archaeological interpretation, something in stark contrast to the processualists' insistence that archaeological interpretation could be objective. As a result, Trigger thought Childe to be a "prototypical post-processual archaeologist".

== Personal life ==
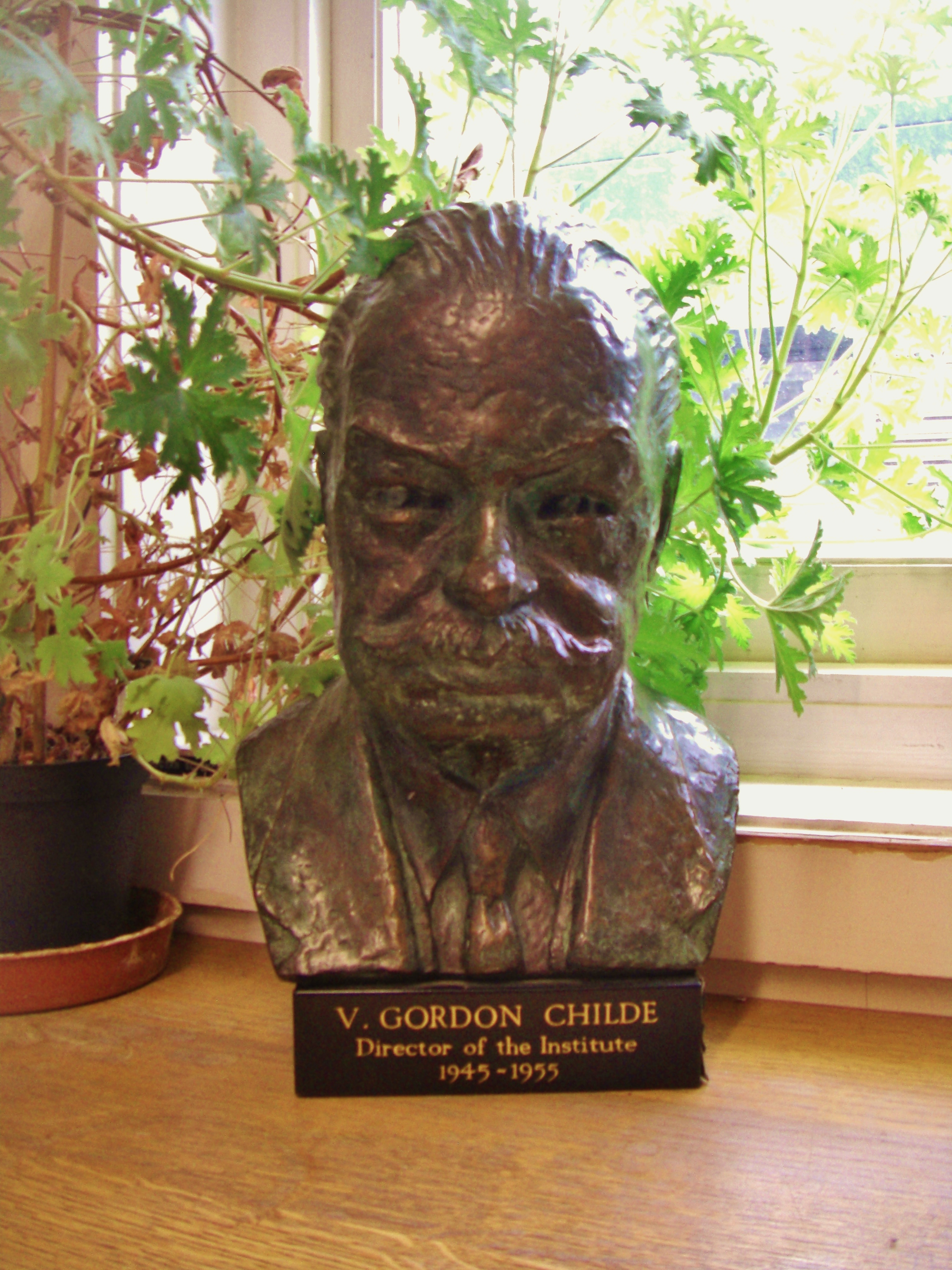
The bronze bust of Childe by Marjorie Maitland Howard has been kept in the library of the Institute of Archaeology since 1958. Childe thought it made him look like a Neanderthal.

Childe's biographer Sally Green found no evidence that Childe ever had a serious intimate relationship; she assumed he was heterosexual because she found no evidence of same-sex attraction. Conversely, his student Don Brothwell thought him to be homosexual. He had many friends of both sexes, although he remained "awkward and uncouth, without any social graces". Despite his difficulties in relating to others, he enjoyed interacting and socialising with his students, often inviting them to dine with him. He was shy and often hid his personal feelings. Brothwell suggested that these personality traits may reflect undiagnosed Asperger syndrome.

Childe believed the study of the past could offer guidance for how humans should act in the present and future. He was known for his radical left-wing views, being a socialist from his undergraduate days. He sat on the committees of several left-wing groups, although avoided involvement in Marxist intellectual arguments within the Communist Party and—with the exception of How Labour Governs—did not commit his non-archaeological opinions to print. Many of his political views are therefore evident only through comments made in private correspondence. Renfrew noted that Childe was liberal-minded on social issues, but thought that—although Childe deplored racism—he did not entirely escape the pervasive nineteenth-century view on distinct differences between different races. Trigger similarly observed racist elements in some of Childe's culture-historical writings, including the suggestion that Nordic peoples had a "superiority in physique", although Childe later disavowed these ideas. In a private letter, Childe wrote to the archaeologist Christopher Hawkes, he said he disliked Jews.

Childe was an atheist and critic of religion, viewing it as a false consciousness based in superstition that served the interests of dominant elites. In History (1947) he commented that "magic is a way of making people believe they are going to get what they want, whereas religion is a system for persuading them that they ought to want what they get". He nevertheless regarded Christianity as being superior over (what he regarded as) primitive religion, commenting that "Christianity as a religion of love surpasses all others in stimulating positive virtue". In a letter written during the 1930s, he said that "only in days of exceptional bad temper do I desire to hurt people's religious convictions".

Childe was fond of driving cars, enjoying the "feeling of power" he got from them. He often told a story about how he had raced at high speed down Piccadilly, London, at three in the morning for the sheer enjoyment of it, only to be pulled over by a policeman. He loved practical jokes, and allegedly kept a halfpenny in his pocket to trick pickpockets. On one occasion he played a joke on the delegates at a Prehistoric Society conference by lecturing them on a theory that the Neolithic monument of Woodhenge had been constructed as an imitation of Stonehenge by a nouveau riche chieftain. Some audience members failed to realise he was being tongue in cheek. He could speak several European languages, having taught himself in early life when he was travelling across the continent.

Childe's other hobbies included walking in the British hillsides, attending classical music concerts, and playing the card game contract bridge. He was fond of poetry; his favourite poet was John Keats, and his favourite poems were William Wordsworth's "Ode to Duty" and Robert Browning's "A Grammarian's Funeral". He was not particularly interested in reading novels, but his favourite was D. H. Lawrence's Kangaroo (1923), a book echoing many of Childe's own feelings about Australia. He was a fan of good quality food and drink, and frequented restaurants. Known for his battered, tatty attire, Childe always wore his wide-brimmed black hat—purchased from a hatter in Jermyn Street, central London—as well as a tie, which was usually red, a colour chosen to symbolise his socialist beliefs. He regularly wore a black Mackintosh raincoat, often carrying it over his arm or draped over his shoulders like a cape. In summer he frequently wore shorts with socks, sock suspenders, and large boots.

== Legacy and influence ==
On his death, Childe was praised by his colleague Stuart Piggott as "the greatest prehistorian in Britain and probably the world". The archaeologist Randall H. McGuire later described him as "probably the best known and most cited archaeologist of the twentieth century", an idea echoed by Bruce Trigger, while Barbara McNairn labelled him "one of the most outstanding and influential figures in the discipline". The archaeologist Andrew Sherratt described Childe as occupying "a crucial position in the history" of archaeology. Sherratt also noted that "Childe's output, by any standard, was massive". Over the course of his career, Childe published more than twenty books and around 240 scholarly articles. The archaeologist Brian Fagan described his books as "simple, well-written narratives" which became "archaeological canon between the 1930s and early 1960s". By 1956, he was cited as the most translated Australian author in history, having seen his books published in such languages as Chinese, Czech, Dutch, French, German, Hindi, Hungarian, Italian, Japanese, Polish, Russian, Spanish, Sweden and Turkish. The archaeologists David Lewis-Williams and David Pearce considered Childe "probably the most written about" archaeologist in history, commenting that his books were still "required reading" for those in the discipline in 2005. As of 2024, the University of Sydney named the Vere Gordon Childe Centre in his honour.

"The most original and useful contributions that I may have made to prehistory are certainly not novel data rescued by brilliant excavation from the soil or by patient research from dusty museum cases, nor yet well founded chronological schemes nor freshly defined cultures, but rather interpretative concepts and methods of explanation."

— Gordon Childe, 1958.

Known as "the Great Synthesizer", Childe is primarily respected for developing a synthesis of European and Near Eastern prehistory at a time when most archaeologists focused on regional sites and sequences. Since his death, this framework has been heavily revised following the discovery of radiocarbon dating, his interpretations have been "largely rejected", and many of his conclusions about Neolithic and Bronze Age Europe have been found to be incorrect. Childe himself believed his primary contribution to archaeology was in his interpretative frameworks, an analysis supported by Alison Ravetz and Peter Gathercole. According to Sherratt: "What is of lasting value in his interpretations is the more detailed level of writing, concerned with the recognition of patterns in the material he described. It is these patterns which survive as classic problems of European prehistory, even when his explanations of them are recognised as inappropriate". Childe's theoretical work had been largely ignored in his lifetime, and remained forgotten in the decades after his death, although it would see a resurgence in the late 1990s and early 2000s. It remained best known in Latin America, where Marxism remained a core theoretical current among archaeologists throughout the latter 20th century.

Despite his global influence, Childe's work was poorly understood in the United States, where his work on European prehistory never became well known. As a result, in the United States he erroneously gained the reputation of being a Near Eastern specialist and a founder of neo-evolutionism, alongside Julian Steward and Leslie White, despite the fact that his approach was "more subtle and nuanced" than theirs. Steward repeatedly misrepresented Childe as a unilinear evolutionist in his writings, perhaps as part of an attempt to distinguish his own "multilinear" evolutionary approach from the ideas of Marx and Engels. In contrast to this American neglect and misrepresentation, Trigger believed it was an American archaeologist, Robert McCormick Adams, Jr., who did the most to posthumously develop Childe's "most innovative ideas". Childe also had a small following of American archaeologists and anthropologists in the 1940s who wanted to bring back materialist and Marxist ideas into their research after years in which Boasian particularism had been dominant within the discipline. In the U.S., his name was also referenced in the 2008 blockbuster film Indiana Jones and the Kingdom of the Crystal Skull.

=== Academic conferences and publications ===
"While he may not have provided answers that modern archaeologists find satisfactory, [Childe] challenged colleagues of his own and succeeding decades by constructing a vision of archaeology that was as broad as that of other social sciences, but which also took account of the particular strengths and limitations of archaeological data."

— Bruce Trigger, 1994

Following his death, several articles examining Childe's impact on archaeology were published. In 1980, Bruce Trigger's Gordon Childe: Revolutions in Archaeology appeared, which studied the influences that extended over Childe's archaeological thought; the same year saw the publication of Barbara McNairn's The Method and Theory of V. Gordon Childe, examining his methodological and theoretical approaches to archaeology. The following year, Sally Green published Prehistorian: A Biography of V. Gordon Childe, in which she described him as "the most eminent and influential scholar of European prehistory in the twentieth century". Peter Gathercole thought the work of Trigger, McNairn, and Green was "extremely important"; Tringham considered it all part of a "let's-get-to-know-Childe-better" movement.

In July 1986, a colloquium devoted to Childe's work was held in Mexico City, marking the 50th anniversary of Man Makes Himself's publication. In September 1990, the University of Queensland's Australian Studies Centre organised a centenary conference for Childe in Brisbane, with presentations examining both his scholarly and his socialist work. In May 1992, a conference marking his centenary was held at the UCL Institute of Archaeology in London, co-sponsored by the Institute and the Prehistoric Society, both organisations he had formerly headed. The conference proceedings were published in a 1994 volume edited by David R. Harris, the Institute's director, entitled The Archaeology of V. Gordon Childe: Contemporary Perspectives. Harris said the book sought to "demonstrate the dynamic qualities of Childe's thought, the breadth and depth of his scholarship, and the continuing relevance of his work to contemporary issues in archaeology". In 1995, another conference collection was published. Titled Childe and Australia: Archaeology, Politics and Ideas, it was edited by Peter Gathercole, T. H. Irving, and Gregory Melleuish. Further papers appeared on the subject of Childe in ensuing years, looking at such subjects as his personal correspondences, and final resting place.

== Collections ==
University College London holds a small archive of material relating to Childe. The material was collected by John Lewis, a student of Childe's who received a postgraduate Diploma in European Pre-History from the Institute of Archaeology (1952 - 1954).

== Books ==
The first detailed bibliography of Childe's work was by Isobel F. Smith, "Bibliography of the Publications of Professor V. Gordon Childe", in Proceedings of the Prehistoric Society, vol. 21, July 1956, pp. 295–304. Sally Green includes a revised version completed to 1979 in her Prehistorian: A Biography of V. Gordon Childe (Bradford-on-Avon: Moonraker Press, 1981), pp. 176–190.

Title	Year	Publisher
How Labour Governs: A Study of Workers' Representation in Australia	1923	The Labour Publishing Company (London)
The Dawn of European Civilization	1925	Kegan Paul (London)
The Aryans: A Study of Indo-European Origins	1926	Kegan Paul (London)
The Most Ancient East: The Oriental Prelude to European Prehistory	1928	Kegan Paul (London)
The Danube in Prehistory	1929	Oxford University Press (Oxford)
The Bronze Age	1930	Cambridge University Press (Cambridge)
Skara Brae: A Pictish Village in Orkney	1931	Kegan Paul (London)
The Forest Cultures of Northern Europe: A Study in Evolution and Diffusion	1931	Royal Anthropological Institute of Great Britain and Ireland (London)
The Continental Affinities of British Neolithic Pottery	1932	Royal Anthropological Institute of Great Britain and Ireland (London)
Skara Brae Orkney. Official Guide	1933 Second Edition 1950	His Majesty's Stationery Office (Edinburgh)
New Light on the Most Ancient East: The Oriental Prelude to European Prehistory	1934	Kegal Paul (London)
The Prehistory of Scotland	1935	Kegan Paul (London)
Man Makes Himself	1936, slightly revised 1941, 1951	Watts (London)
Prehistoric Communities of the British Isles	1940, second edition 1947	Chambers (London)
What Happened in History	1942	Penguin Books (Harmondsworth)
The Story of Tools	1944	Cobbett (London)
Progress and Archaeology	1944	Watts (London)
Scotland before the Scots, being the Rhind lectures for 1944	1946	Methuen (London)
History	1947	Cobbett (London)
Social Worlds of Knowledge	1949	Oxford University Press (London)
Prehistoric Migrations in Europe	1950	Aschehaug (Oslo)
Magic, Craftsmanship and Science	1950	Liverpool University Press (Liverpool)
Social Evolution	1951	Schuman (New York)
Illustrated Guide to Ancient Monuments: Vol. VI Scotland	1952	Her Majesty's Stationery Office (London)
Society and Knowledge: The Growth of Human Traditions	1956	Harper (New York)
Piecing Together the Past: The Interpretation of Archeological Data	1956	Routledge and Kegan Paul (London)
A Short Introduction to Archaeology	1956	Muller (London)
The Prehistory of European Society	1958	Penguin (Harmondsworth)
