= Dudley Collard =

- Born: 1907
- Died: 1963 (aged 55–56)
- Occupations: Barrister; writer
- Known for: Lawyer for the Communist Party of Great Britain; author of "Soviet Justice and the Trial of Radek and Others"

William Dudley Collard (1907–1963) was a British barrister and writer on law in the Soviet Union. Collard was a member of the Anglo-Soviet Law Association, and represented the Communist Party of Great Britain as a lawyer. His affiliation with communism led to the intelligence services keeping a file on him.

Following the "Trial of the Anti-Soviet Trotskyist Center" in 1937 (the second of the Moscow Trials), Collard published a book through the Left Book Club entitled Soviet Justice and the Trial of Radek and Others which argued that the trials had been conducted fairly. Most historians now conclude that the Moscow Trials were show trials.

He was married to Elizabeth Katherine Collard (1911—28 December 1978), a writer, journalist and political activist with a particular interest in Middle Eastern issues.

== See also ==
- Denis Pritt — wrote the introduction to Collard's Soviet Justice
