= Adolf Sturmthal =

Austrian political scientist (1903–1986)

Adolf Fox Sturmthal (born 10 September 1903 in Vienna, died 11 June 1986 in Avon, Connecticut) was a U.S. political scientist, sociologist and journalist of Austrian birth who specialised in labour studies and international relations.

== Biography ==
Sturmthal earned a PhD in Political Science in 1925 at Vienna University. He was chairman of the Association of Austrian Social Democratic Students and Academics. He moved to Zurich in 1926 to assist Friedrich Adler, the secretary of the Labour and Socialist International, and was editor of International Information. In 1933 and 1934 he organised international aid for German and Austrian socialist refugees from the Austrofascist Dollfuss and Nazi regimes. Following prosecution for alleged passport abuse, he emigrated to Belgium and Great Britain and then to the United States in 1938.

Sturmthal was the first Philip Murray Professor of International Studies at Roosevelt University in Chicago. From 1960 he was a professor of labour and industrial sociology at the University of Illinois. The journal Foreign Affairs, reviewing a book to which Strumthal contributed, noted that Sturmthal's survey of foreign labor movements "will be of particular interest to readers of this journal."

At the time of his death he lived in Champaign, Illinois.

== Works ==
=== Books ===
- Die grosse Krise [The Great Crisis] (Europa Verlag, 1937)
- The Tragedy of European Labor: 1918-1939 (Columbia University Press, 1943)
- Unity and Diversity in European Labor: An Introduction to Contemporary Labor Movements (The Free Press, 1953)
- Workers Councils: A Study of Workplace Organization on Both Sides of the Iron Curtain (Harvard University Press, 1964)
- Comparative Labor Movements: Ideological Roots and Institutional Development (Wadsworth, 1972)
- Left of Center: European Labor since World War II (University of Illinois Press, 1983)
- Democracy Under Fire: The Memoirs Of A European Socialist (Suzanne S. Russin, editor, Duke University Press, 1988).

=== Edited volumes ===
- Contemporary Collective Bargaining in Seven Countries (Cornell International Industrial and Labor Relations Reports, 1957)
- White-Collar Trade Unions: Contemporary Developments in Industrialized Societies (University of Illinois Press, 1966)
- The International Labor Movement in Transition: Essays on Africa, Asia, Europe and South America (with James G. Scoville, University of Illinois Press, 1973)
