= Andrew Roth =

American-British journalist (1919–2010)

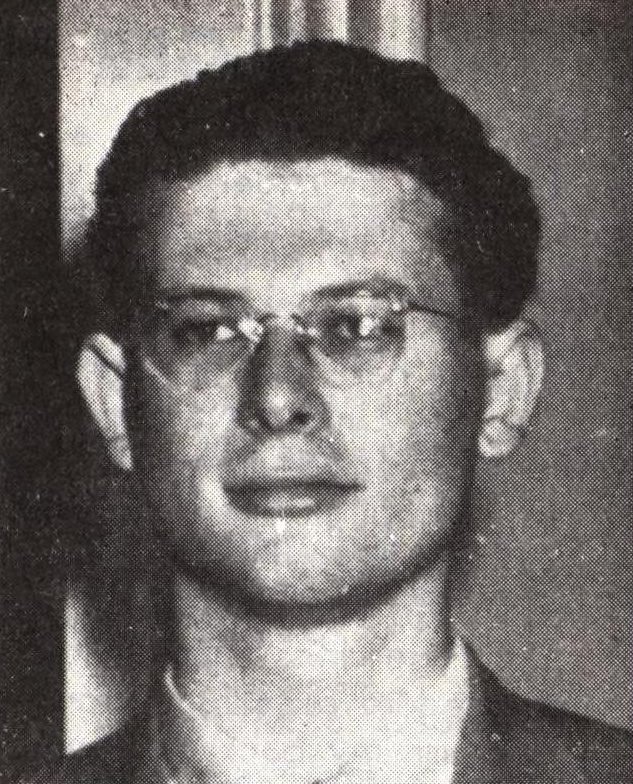
Roth c. 1945

Andrew Roth (23 April 1919 – 12 August 2010) was a biographer and journalist known for his compilation of Parliamentary Profiles, a directory of biographies of British Members of Parliament, a small sample of which is available online in The Guardian. Active amongst the politicians and journalists in Westminster for sixty years, he also made appearances on British television. He first gained prominence when arrested in 1945 as one of six suspects in the Amerasia spy case.

He scoured Hansard, gossip columns, vote papers and committee reports to compile his profiles of the personnel of the British Parliament and assessed their character traits, history, opinions and psychological drives. The profiles also included cartoon caricatures by his daughter, Terry Roth.

Roth's detailed obituaries were composed for international and national figures of note, using the skills and information he had collected in his biographical research. A catalogue of his published obituaries in the archives of The Guardian provides a historical perspective to contemporary news as the deaths of the noteworthy are documented and he reviews their lives.

== Background ==
Roth was born to Hungarian parents in New York City and attended City College of New York, Columbia University, the University of Michigan and Harvard University. He studied the history of east Asia.

He was the son of orthodox Jews; fifty of his relatives were murdered in the Holocaust. He took UK citizenship in 1966.

== Career ==
=== Amerasia case ===
During 1940, Roth was a researcher at the Institute of Pacific Relations.

During World War II, Roth served as a lieutenant with the US Office of Naval Intelligence (ONI). The Navy sent him to Harvard University to study Japanese. Upon learning of his membership in the Communist Party USA, the Navy promoted him to liaison with the United States Department of State due to a shortage of Japanese linguists.

In June 1945, Roth and five others were arrested during an FBI investigation into the leaking of documents to the journal Amerasia. He was subsequently cleared.

=== United Kingdom ===
Roth was a journalist and foreign correspondent in twenty countries before settling in the United Kingdom in 1950. He was political correspondent for the Manchester Evening News from 1972 to 1984, contributed to the New Statesman from 1984 to 1997 and was an obituarist and contributor to The Guardian from 1996. He contributed five articles to the Dictionary of National Biography.

From 1953, he published Parliamentary Profiles which featured biographies of MPs, MEPs and Lords, which became a regularly updated multi-volume publication. He was best known for this publication, which The Daily Telegraph called a "Westminster institution". He continued updating this publication to 2010, and it with its research documents and notes, including about half a million press cuttings, is now archived at the Bishopsgate Institute.

From 1955, he produced a weekly Westminster Confidential newsletter, particularly used by embassies and foreign correspondents in London. The newsletter made the first report linking Secretary of State for War John Profumo with Christine Keeler, which developed into the Profumo affair political scandal. He continued this publication until his death.

In 1961, he called for the creation of a Register of Members' Interests in the foreword of his publication The Business Background of MPs, noting that 330 MPs held 490 company directorships.

== Death ==
Roth died of prostate cancer at the age of 91. He was survived by his third wife, Antoinette Putnam, a son, Neil, a daughter, Terry, and three grandchildren.

== Works ==
- Dilemma in Japan (1946)
- Parliamentary Profiles (multiple editions and volumes, 1953-2010)
- The Business Background of British MPs (seven editions, 1959-80)
- Heath and the Heathmen (1972)
- Infamous Manhattan (1996)

== Bibliography ==
- Enoch Powell: Tory Tribune (London, 1970) ISBN 9780356031507
- Heath and the Heathmen (Routledge, 1972) ISBN 0-7100-7429-8
- Sir Harold Wilson: Yorkshire Walter Mitty (Macdonald & J, 1977) ISBN 0-356-08074-9
