= David W. Petegorsky =

Canadian historian (1915–1956)

David W. Petegorsky (1915 – July 15, 1956) was author of an acclaimed book on Gerrard Winstanley and the Diggers.

He was born in Ottawa, the only son of Leon and Beckie Petegorsky. He had three sisters and attended Lisgar Collegiate in Ottawa followed by Yeshiva College where he was valedictorian of the 1935 class and received his rabbinical degree in 1936.

As a young Canadian student, Petegorsky studied for a doctoral degree at London School of Economics under Harold Laski. His book Left-Wing Democracy in the English Civil War was published as part of the Left Book Club series by Victor Gollancz, and republished by Sandpiper in 1999. This was his only book.

In 1940 he received his Ph.D. from the London School of Economics. A year later, he was an instructor at Antioch College in Yellow Springs, Ohio. In 1942, he returned to Ottawa where he held an information post with the Canadian Government, first with the National Film Board, and then with the Wartime Information Board, as director of its industrial section. During this time he wrote extensively for learned quarterlies and political journals. In addition, he published two books on political subjects.

Then in 1945 he returned to New York City and became executive director of the American Jewish Congress. He was involved with Robert S Marcus in the World Jewish Affairs Department of the American Jewish Congress. p.251 In 1948, he became a member of the executive committee of the World Jewish Congress. He held both positions until his death. His funeral was held at the Kehillath Jeshurun Synagogue in New York.

In 1952, he married Carol Coan. They had twin sons, Stephen and Dan, born in 1954.

At Yeshiva University, New York, there is a David W. Petegorsky chair of Political Science. This is a tribute to his memory by the Yeshiva College Alumni Association In 1957, the Women's Division of the American Jewish Congress initiated the David Petegorsky Scholarship Awards which sent youth between the ages of 17 and 22 to Israel for 6 weeks on workshops

== Publications ==
(1942) Strategy for democracy, by J. Donald Kingsley and David W. Petegorsky, with chapters by Pierre Cot, Max Werner, Albert Gue rard, Oscar I. Janowsky [and] Mordecai Ezekiel ... New York, Toronto, Longmans, Green and co..

== Comments on Petegorsky's work ==
Ariel Hessayon on "Fabricating radical traditions":

Like his contemporary Harold Laski, Tawney taught at the LSE and it was Laski's Canadian-born Jewish doctoral student David Petegorsky who completed a study of Winstanley's social philosophy. Published by the Socialist Victor Gollancz and distributed through the Left Book Club - an anti-fascist organization established in 1936 with a membership at its peak of 57,000, Petegorsky's Left-Wing Democracy in the English Civil War (1940) included chapters on 'The development of radical political thought' and Winstanley as a 'forgotten radical'. Influenced by Tawney and Laski, Petegorsky began by outlining modifications to the 'feudal structure' of English society: emergent capitalism, the rise of the middle classes, and the effects of enclosure on masses of peasants which increased urban migration and vagrancy. According to Petegorsky, Winstanley's first two 'almost unreadable' pamphlets of 1648 were typical products of chiliastic mysticism, his religious doctrines characteristic of the 'environment of the age'. Thereafter Winstanley shed that mysticism, developing 'progressive rationalist' arguments and a concern with 'practical communism' to appear as the 'most advanced radical of the century'. Significantly, Petegorsky also drew parallels between Winstanley's analysis of the 'relationship of economic power to political organization' and social transition in the twentieth century, insisting that Winstanley's challenge had 'lost none of its pertinence for our time'. The organizers of a 'Festival of Music for the People' at the Albert Hall agreed for the Diggers' song was performed on 1 April 1939 - fabled anniversary of the group's foundation.

- Christopher Hill begins his foreword to the reprint of the book by saying: "Petegorsky's book was a shining light in the dark days of 1940. It is ... a pioneering study of Gerrard Winstanley, and it still offers the best analysis of his ideas .... Petegorsky's book did not attract the attention it deserved. ... Petegorsky, alas, did not live to publish the major works which would have transformed our understanding of the English Revolution."

== Sources ==
- Ottawa Jewish Archives. "Description of the David W. Petegorsky fonds". Archeion. Archives Association of Ontario.
