= Dennis Harding =

British archaeologist and academic

Dennis William Harding, FRSE (born 1940), known as D. W. Harding, is a British archaeologist and academic, specialising in the British Iron Age. Having taught at the University of Durham from 1966 to 1977, he was then Abercromby Professor of Archaeology at the University of Edinburgh from 1977 to 2007.

== Biography ==
Harding was born in Poole, Dorset on 11 April 1940. He studied English Language and Literature at Keble College, Oxford, graduating with a Bachelor of Arts (BA) degree in 1963. Amongst his tutors were John Carey and Malcolm Parkes. He then took a Doctor of Philosophy (DPhil) degree in archaeology: his supervisor in the Institute of Archaeology was Christopher Hawkes. He spent the 1965/66 academic year as an assistant keeper in the Department of Antiquities of the Ashmolean Museum. He completed his DPhil in 1969 with a doctoral thesis titled "The Iron Age of the Upper Thames basin and its further relations to other regions of southern Britain".

Harding joined Durham University as a lecturer in Celtic archaeology in 1966. He was promoted to senior lecturer in 1975. In 1977, he was appointed Abercromby Professor of Archaeology at the University of Edinburgh, succeeding Stuart Piggott. Under his leadership, the archaeology department maintained its strengths in prehistoric Europe and Near Eastern archaeology. In addition to his chair, he was dean of the Faculty of Arts from 1983 to 1986, and vice-principal of the University of Edinburgh from 1988 to 1991. He retired in 2007, and was made emeritus professor.

== Selected works ==
- Harding, D. W. (1974). The Iron Age in lowland Britain. London: Routledge.
- Harding, D. W. (1976). Hillforts: later prehistoric earthworks in Britain and Ireland. London: Academic Press. ISBN 9780123247506.
- Harding, D. W. (1978). Prehistoric Europe. Oxford: Elsevier-Phaidon. ISBN 9780729000482.
- Harding, D. W. (2004). The Iron Age in northern Britain: Celts and Romans, natives and invaders. London: Routledge. ISBN 978-0415301503.
- Harding, D. W. (2007). The archaeology of Celtic art. London: Routledge. ISBN 9780203698532.
- Harding, D. W. (2009). The Iron Age round-house: later prehistoric building in Britain and beyond. Oxford: Oxford University Press. ISBN 978-0199558575.
- Harding, D. W. (2012). Iron age hillforts in Britain and beyond. Oxford: Oxford University Press. ISBN 978-0199695249.
- Harding, D. W. (2016). Death and burial in Iron Age Britain. Oxford: Oxford University Press. ISBN 978-0199687565.
- Harding, D. W. (2020). Rewriting history: changing perceptions of the archaeological past. Oxford: Oxford University Press. ISBN 9780191887949.
