= Outline of Marxism =

Overview of and topical guide to Marxism

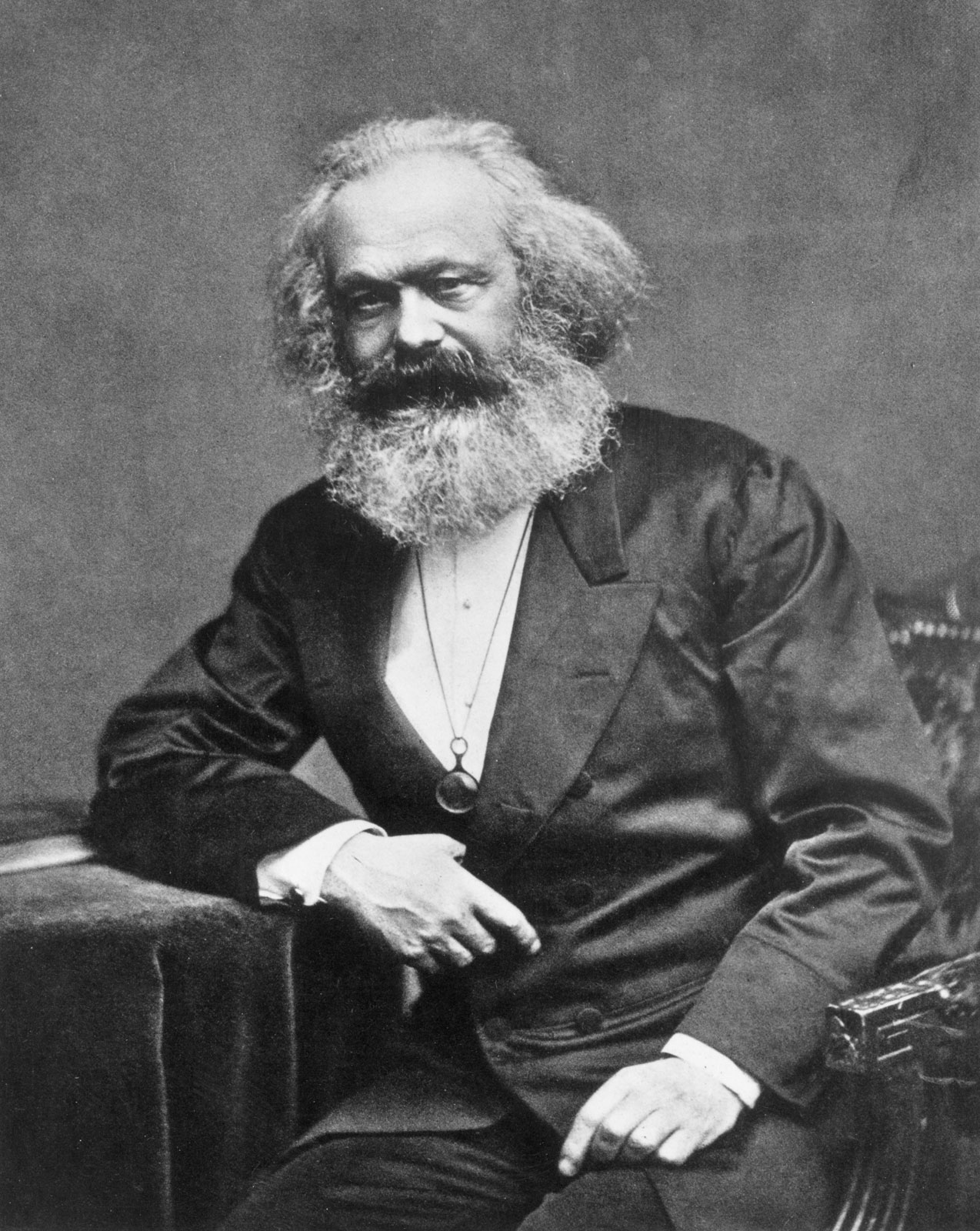
Karl Marx in 1875

The following outline is provided as an overview of and topical guide to Marxism:

Marxism – method of socioeconomic analysis that analyzes class relations and societal conflict using a materialist interpretation of historical development and a dialectical view of social transformation. It originates from some of the work of or all of the work of the mid-to-late 19th century works of German philosophers Karl Marx and Friedrich Engels.

According to Marxist perspective, class conflicts conditions the evolution of modes of production, such as the development of slavery to feudalism to capitalism, and as such, the contradictions of capitalism demands the organization of the proletariat to establish a communist society through revolution and maintenance of the dictatorship of the proletariat. Marxism has since developed into different branches and schools of thought, and there is now no single definitive Marxist theory.

== History of Marxism ==
- History of communism
- Marxist historiography
- Revisionism
  - Anti-revisionism

== Marxist fields of study ==
- Marxist aesthetics
- Marxist archaeology
- Marxist criminology
- Marxist cultural analysis
- Marxian economics
- Marxist feminism
- Marxist film theory
- Marxist historiography
- Marxist international relations theory
- Marxist literary criticism
- Marxist philosophy
  - Chinese Marxist philosophy
- Marxist sociology

== Marxian critique of political economy ==
- Mode of production
  - Primitive communism
  - Asiatic mode of production
  - Feudal mode of production
  - Capitalist mode of production
  - Socialist mode of production
- Means of production
- Relations of production
  - Exploitation of labour
- Factors of production
  - Subject of labor
  - Means of labor
  - Labour power
- Capital
  - Rate of profit
  - Capital accumulation
  - Organic composition of capital
    - Constant capital
    - Variable capital
- Surplus value
- Surplus labour
- Surplus product
- Law of value
  - Commodity
  - Value form
  - Use value
  - Exchange value

== Marxist sociology ==
- Social class / Marxian class theory
  - Bourgeoisie
  - Petite bourgeoisie
  - Proletariat
  - Peasantry
  - Lumpenproletariat
- False consciousness
- Class consciousness
- Class struggle
- Alienation
- Base and superstructure
- Social metabolism
  - Metabolic rift

== Marxist philosophy ==
- Dialectical materialism
- Philosophy in the Soviet Union

== Marxist schools of thought ==
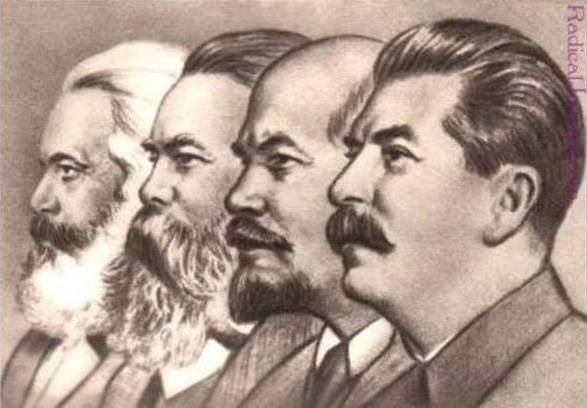
From left to right, Marx, Engels, Lenin and Stalin. Faces of key Marxist thinkers are often used to represent some Marxism branches, with variations including Mao and others.

- Classical Marxism
- De Leonism
- Orthodox Marxism
- Luxemburgism
- Leninism
  - Marxism–Leninism
    - Stalinism
    - Titoism
    - Hoxhaism
    - Juche
    - Maoism
      - Socialism with Chinese characteristics
        - Deng Xiaoping Theory
          - Xi Jinping Thought
      - Marxism–Leninism–Maoism
        - Marxism–Leninism–Maoism–Prachanda Path
  - Trotskyism
- Bordigism
- Council communism
- Eurocommunism

== Persons influential in Marxism ==
- Karl Marx
- Friedrich Engels

Marx and Engels influences

- Georg Wilhelm Friedrich Hegel
- Ludwig Feuerbach
- Adam Smith
- David Ricardo

Marxist theorists

- Karl Kautsky
- Walter Benjamin
- Antonio Gramsci
- György Lukács
- Theodor W. Adorno
- Herbert Marcuse
- Louis Althusser
- Guy Debord
- Raya Dunayevskaya
- Raymond Williams
- Antonio Negri
- Michael Hardt
- Slavoj Žižek
- Alain Badiou
- Vladimir Lenin

Other persons

- Marxists by nationality
- Anti-Revisionists
- Marxian economists
- Marxist historians
  - Eric Hobsbawm
- Marxist writers

== Marxist bibliography ==
=== Works by Karl Marx and Friedrich Engels ===
Marx and Engels

- The Holy Family (1844)
- The German Ideology (1846)
- The Communist Manifesto (1848)
- Revolution and Counter-Revolution in Germany (1851–1852)
- The Civil War in the United States (1861–1862)

Marx

- The Eighteenth Brumaire of Louis Napoleon (1852)
- Grundrisse (1857–1858)
- A Contribution to the Critique of Political Economy (1859)
- Theses on Feuerbach (1888)
- Das Kapital
  - Das Kapital, Volume I (1867)
  - Das Kapital, Volume II (1885)
  - Das Kapital, Volume III (1894)

Engels

- Anti-Dühring (1878)
- The Origin of the Family, Private Property and the State (1884)

=== Works by Karl Kautsky ===
- The Class Struggle (Erfurt Program) (1892)
- Forerunners of Modern Socialism (1895)
- The Dictatorship of the Proletariat (Kautsky) (1918)

=== Works by Vladimir Lenin ===
- What Is to Be Done? (1902)
- The State and Revolution (1917)
- Imperialism, the Highest Stage of Capitalism (1917)
- The Tasks of the Proletariat in the Present Revolution (The April Theses, 1917)
- "Left-Wing" Communism: An Infantile Disorder (1929)

=== Works by Joseph Stalin ===
- Marxism and the National Question (1913)
- Foundations of Leninism (1924)
- Dialectical and Historical Materialism (1938)

=== Works by Leon Trotsky ===
- The Permanent Revolution (1930)
- The Revolution Betrayed (1937)

=== Works by Mao Zedong ===
- On Guerrilla Warfare (1937)
- On Practice (1937)
- On Contradiction (1937)
- On Protracted War (1938)

=== Other influential works ===
- History and Class Consciousness (György Lukács, 1923)
- Prison Notebooks (Antonio Gramsci, 1929–1935)
- Ideology and Ideological State Apparatuses (Louis Althusser, 1970)

=== Marxist academic journals ===
- New Left Review
- Capital & Class
- Radical Philosophy
- Rethinking Marxism
- Historical Materialism

== Marxist organizations ==
=== Early organizations ===
- League of the Just
- Communist League

=== International Marxist organizations ===
- Communist International
- Committee for a Workers' International
- International Communist Party

=== Ruling Marxist Parties ===
- Chinese Communist Party
- Communist Party of Vietnam
- Workers' Party of Korea
- Communist Party of Cuba
- Lao People's Revolutionary Party
- Communist Party of the Soviet Union (1912-1991)
- League of Communists of Yugoslavia (1919-1991)
- Party of Labour of Albania (1945-1991)
- Socialist Unity Party of Germany (1946-1989)
- Romanian Communist Party (1921-1989)

=== United States ===
- All-African People's Revolutionary Party
- American Labor Party
- American Workers Party
- Black Panther Party
- Communist Party (Marxist–Leninist) (United States)
- Communist Party USA
- Freedom Socialist Party
- Internationalist Workers Party (Fourth International)
- Party for Socialism and Liberation
- Red Guard Party
- Revolutionary Communist Party, USA
- Socialist Action (United States)
- Socialist Alternative (United States)
- Socialist Equality Party (United States)
- World Socialist Party of the United States
- Workers Party (United States)
- Workers Party of the United States
- Workingmen's Party of the United States

== See also ==
- Outline of socialism
- Outline of economics
- Outline of political science
