= Classical Marxism =

Marxism as expounded by Marx and Engels

Classical Marxism is the body of Marxian economics and Marxist theory expounded by Karl Marx and Friedrich Engels in their works. It is contrasted with orthodox Marxism, Marxism–Leninism, and other schools of Marxist thought which emerged after their deaths. The core concepts of classical Marxism include alienation, base and superstructure, class consciousness, class struggle, exploitation, historical materialism, ideology, revolution; and the forces, means, modes, and relations of production. Marx's political praxis (application of theory), including his attempt to organize a professional revolutionary body in the First International, often served as an area of debate for subsequent theorists.

== Main ideas ==
Marx's main ideas included:

- Alienation: Marx refers to the alienation of people from aspects of their "human nature" (Gattungswesen, usually translated as "species-essence" or "species-being"), as well as from the goods they produce and the workers around them. He believed that alienation is a systematic result of capitalism. Under capitalism, the fruits of production belong to the employers, who expropriate the surplus created by others and in so doing generate alienated labour. Alienation describes objective features of a person's situation in capitalism—it is not necessary for them to believe or feel that they are alienated.
- Base and superstructure: Marx and Engels use the “base-structure” concept to explain the idea that the totality of relations among people with regard to “the social production of their existence” forms the economic basis, on which arises a superstructure of political and legal institutions. To the base corresponds the social consciousness which includes religious, philosophical and other main ideas. The base conditions both, the superstructure and the social consciousness. A conflict between the development of material productive forces and the relations of production causes social revolutions and the resulting change in the economic basis will sooner or later lead to the transformation of the superstructure. For Marx, this relationship is not a one way process—it is reflexive and the base determines the superstructure in the first instance at the same time as it remains the foundation of a form of social organization which is itself transformed as an element in the overall dialectical process. The relationship between superstructure and base is considered to be a dialectical one, ineffable in a sense except as it unfolds in its material reality in the actual historical process (which scientific socialism aims to explain and ultimately to guide).
- Class consciousness: class consciousness refers to the awareness, both of itself and of the social world around it, that a social class possesses and its capacity to act in its own rational interests based on this awareness. Thus class consciousness must be attained before the class may mount a successful revolution. However, other methods of revolutionary action have been developed, such as vanguardism.
- Exploitation: Marx refers to the exploitation of an entire segment or class of society by another. He sees it as being an inherent feature and key element of capitalism and free markets. The profit gained by the capitalist is the difference between the value of the product made by the worker and the actual wage that the worker receives—in other words, capitalism functions on the basis of paying workers less than the full value of their labor in order to enable the capitalist class to turn a profit.
- Historical materialism: historical materialism was first articulated by Marx, although he himself never used the term. It looks for the causes of developments and changes in human societies in the way in which humans collectively make the means to life, thus giving an emphasis through economic analysis to everything that co-exists with the economic base of society (e.g. social classes, political structures, ideologies).
- Means of production: the means of production are a combination of the means of labor and the subject of labor used by workers to make products. The means of labor include machines, tools, equipment, infrastructure and "all those things with the aid of which man acts upon the subject of labor, and transforms it". The subject of labor includes raw materials and materials directly taken from nature. Means of production by themselves produce nothing— labor power is needed for production to take place.
- Ideology: without offering a general definition for "ideology", Marx on several instances has used the term to designate the production of images of social reality. According to Engels, “ideology is a process accomplished by the so-called thinker consciously, it is true, but with a false consciousness. The real motive forces impelling him remain unknown to him; otherwise it simply would not be an ideological process. Hence he imagines false or seeming motive forces”. Because the ruling class controls the society's means of production, the superstructure of society as well as its ruling ideas will be determined according to what is in the ruling class's best interests. As Marx said famously in The German Ideology, “the ideas of the ruling class are in every epoch the ruling ideas, i.e. the class which is the ruling material force of society, is at the same time its ruling intellectual force”. Therefore, the ideology of a society is of enormous importance since it confuses the alienated groups and can create false consciousness such as commodity fetishism (perceiving labor as capital—a degradation of human life).
- Mode of production: the mode of production is a specific combination of productive forces (including human the means of production and labour power, tools, equipment, buildings and technologies, materials and improved land) and social and technical relations of production (including the property, power and control relations governing society's productive assets, often codified in law, cooperative work relations and forms of association, relations between people and the objects of their work and the relations between social classes).
- Political economy: the term "political economy" originally meant the study of the conditions under which production was organized in the nation-states of the new-born capitalist system. Political economy then studies the mechanism of human activity in organizing material and the mechanism of distributing the surplus or deficit that is the result of that activity. Political economy studies the means of production, specifically capital and how this manifests itself in economic activity.

=== Distinction between communists and workers ===
Marx describes the communists as having "no separate interests" from the oppressed proletariat. However, they were "the most advanced and resolute" part of the proletarian movement. The communists were to be a unifying party among the proletariat, who had the foresight to support proletarian internationalism and to fully support the working class in all stages of its class struggle against the bourgeoisie. These educated supporters, often from outside the working class, would help bring the proletariat to revolution and help them establish the democratic dictatorship of the proletariat. Thus the communists aide the proletariat in creating the inevitable classless society.

=== Theory of history ===
The Marxist theory of historical materialism understands society as fundamentally determined by the material conditions at any given time—this means the relationships which people enter into with one another in order to fulfill their basic needs, for instance to feed and clothe themselves and their families, and the tools and technology involved in producing these goods. In general, Marx and Engels identified five successive stages of the development of these material conditions in Western Europe, to be followed by communist society.

1. Primitive communism
2. Asiatic
3. Ancient slave society
4. Feudalism
5. Modern bourgeois society
