= Soviet archaeology =

Soviet archaeology may refer to:

- Archaeology of the Soviet Union
- Sovetskaya arkheologiya, an academic journal published from 1957 to 1992
- Marxist archaeology, the dominant school of archaeological thought in the Soviet Union
