= Outline of socialism =

Overview of and topical guide to socialism

The following outline is provided as an overview of and topical guide to socialism:

Socialism – range of economic and social systems characterised by social ownership of the means of production and workers' self-management as well as the political theories and movements associated with them.

Social ownership can be public, collective or cooperative ownership, or citizen ownership of equity. Socialism has numerous variants and so no single definition encapsulating all of them exists, with its definition subject to ongoing academic scrutiny and redefining, although social ownership acts as a common element shared by its various forms.

== Types of socialism ==
=== Broad perspectives ===
- Communism (Left communism)
- Democratic socialism
- Eco-socialism
- Ethical socialism
- Liberal socialism
- Market socialism
- Marxism (Marxist ideas – Marxist terminology)
- Marxism-Leninism
- Revolutionary socialism
- Scientific socialism
- Syndicalism
- Utopian socialism

=== Authoritarian ===
==== Barracks ====
- Nechayevism

==== Bolshevism ====
Leninism – Marxism–Leninism

- Brezhnevism
- Castroism
- Ceaușism
- Guevarism
- Ho Chi Minh Thought
- Hoxhaism
- Husakism
- Juche (originally)
- Kadarism
- Khrushchevism
- Maoism
- Dengism
- Maoism–Third Worldism
- Marxism–Leninism–Maoism
- Marxism–Leninism–Maoism–Gonzalo Thought
- Marxism–Leninism–Maoism–Prachanda Path
- Xi Jinping Thought
- Stalinism
- Tkachevism
- Trotskyism
- Pabloism
- Posadism
- Orthodox Trotskyism

==== Other ====
- Blanquism
- State (Lassallism)

=== Liberal ===
- Social democracy

=== Libertarian ===
==== Anarchism ====
- Anarchism without adjectives
- Anarchist synthesis
- Anarcho-communism
- Anarcho-syndicalism
- Collectivist anarchism
- Market anarchism
- Green anarchism
- Individualist anarchism
- Insurrectionary anarchism
- Magonism
- Mutualism
- Neozapatismo
- Platformism
- Social anarchism

==== Libertarian socialism ====
- Autonomism
- Council communism
- Democratic confederalism
- Left-libertarianism
- Third camp

=== Religious socialism ===
- Buddhist
- Christian (anarchism, communism)
- Islamic
- Jewish (Labor Zionism)

== Nature of socialism ==
=== Defining theme ===
- Social ownership

=== Common themes ===
- Anti-capitalism (Criticism of capitalism – Post-capitalism)
- Class struggle
- Collective ownership
- Common ownership
- Dictatorship of the proletariat
- Planned economy
- Proletarian revolution
- Socialisation of production (Socialist mode of production)
- Socialist economics
- Socialist state

=== Authoritarian socialist themes ===
- State ownership
- State-owned enterprise

=== Liberal socialist themes ===
- Mixed economy
- Law of equal liberty

=== Libertarian socialist themes ===
- Anarchist economics
- Cooperative
- Economic democracy
- Workplace democracy

=== Market socialist themes ===
- Social dividend
- Socialist market economy
- State capitalism

=== Non-market socialist themes ===
- Calculation in kind
- Labour voucher
- Planned economy

=== Reformist socialist themes ===
- Gradualism
- Lassallism
- Revisionism (Marxism)

=== Revolutionary socialist themes ===
- Impossibilism

== Socialist concepts ==
- Impossibilism
- Revisionism

== Regional socialism ==
=== Western ===
- Old left
- New left

== History of socialism ==
- History of socialism
- History of communism

== People ==
=== Socialists ===
- By nationality
- Proto-socialists

=== Key figures ===
- August Bebel
- Bernie Sanders
- Daniel De Leon
- Emma Goldman
- Eugene Debs
- François-Noël Babeuf
- Friedrich Engels
- Georgi Plekhanov
- Henri de Saint-Simon
- James Connolly
- John Ball
- Josip Broz Tito
- Jules Guesde
- Karl Marx
- Leon Trotsky
- Mikhail Bakunin
- Nestor Makhno
- Noam Chomsky
- Paul Lafargue
- Peter Kropotkin
- Pierre-Joseph Proudhon
- Rosa Luxemburg
- Salvador Allende
- Subcomandante Marcos
- Wilhelm Liebknecht
- William Morris

== Socialist movements ==
=== Conflicts ===
- Communist revolutions
- Communist rebellions

== Organisations ==
=== International ===
- International socialist organizations

=== Political parties ===
Socialist parties

- By continent (Africa – Asia – Europe – North America – Oceania – South America)
- By country
- Defunct parties (Asia – Europe – North America)

Communist parties

- By continent
- By country
- Banned parties

=== Trade unions ===
Trade unions

- Trade unions by continent
- Trade unions by country

== Socialist periodicals ==
=== Academic journals ===
- Socialist journals
- Marxist academic journals

=== Magazines ===
- Socialist magazines
- Communist magazines
- Marxist magazines

=== Newspapers ===
- Socialist newspapers
- Communist newspapers
- Marxist newspapers

== Criticisms ==
- Criticisms of socialism (criticism of communist party rule – criticism of Marxism)

== Related navigation boxes ==
- Socialist navigation boxes
- Communism navigation boxes
- Anarchist navigation boxes
- Libertarian navigation boxes
