= Productive forces =

Marxist idea

Productive forces, productive powers, or forces of production (German: Produktivkräfte) is a central idea in Marxism and historical materialism.

In Karl Marx and Friedrich Engels' own critique of political economy, it refers to the combination of the means of labor (tools, machinery, land, infrastructure, and so on) with human relationship between energy in work. Marx and Engels probably derived the concept from Adam Smith's reference to the "productive powers of labour" (see e.g. chapter 8 of The Wealth of Nations (1776)), although the German political economist Friedrich List also mentions the concept of "productive powers" in The National System of Political Economy (1841).

All those forces which are applied by people in the production process (body and brain, tools and techniques, materials, resources, quality of workers' cooperation, and equipment) are encompassed by this concept, including those management and engineering functions technically indispensable for production (as contrasted with social control functions). Human knowledge (General intellect) can also be a productive force.

Together with the social and technical relations of production, the productive forces constitute a historically specific mode of production.

== Labor ==
Karl Marx emphasized that with few exceptions means of labour are not a productive force unless they are actually operated, maintained and conserved by living human labour. Without applying living human labour, their physical condition and value would deteriorate, depreciate, or be destroyed (an example would be a ghost town or capital depreciation due to strike action). Simultaneously, technological developments which serve as means of production would not exist without what Marx refers to as "general intellect," the human innovation and industry which motivates industrial development.

Capital itself, being one of the factors of production, comes to be viewed in capitalist society as a productive force in its own right, independent from labour, a subject with "a life of its own". Indeed, Marx sees the essence of what he calls "the capital relation" as being summarised by the circumstance that "capital buys labour", i.e. the power of property ownership to command human energy and labour-time, and thus of inanimate "things" to exert an autonomous power over people. What disappears from view is that the power of capital depends in the last instance on human cooperation.

"The production of life, both of one's own in labour and of fresh life in procreation... appears as a double relationship: on the one hand as a natural, on the other as a social relationship. By social we understand the co-operation of several individuals, no matter under what conditions, in what manner and to what end. It follows from this that a certain mode of production, or industrial stage, is always combined with a certain mode of co-operation, or social stage, and this mode of co-operation is itself a “productive force.”

The productive power of cooperation comes to be viewed as the productive power of capital, because it is capital which forcibly organises people, rather than people organising capital. Marx regarded this as a supreme reification.

Unlike British classical economics, Marxian economics classifies financial capital as being an element of the relations of production, rather than the factors or forces of production ("not a thing, but a social relation between persons, established by the instrumentality of things").

== Destructive forces ==
Marx and Engels did not believe that human history featured a continuous growth of the productive forces. Rather, the development of the productive forces was characterised by social conflicts. Some productive forces destroyed other productive forces, sometimes productive techniques were lost or destroyed, and sometimes productive forces could be turned into destructive forces:

"How little highly developed productive forces are safe from complete destruction, given even a relatively very extensive commerce, is proved by the Phoenicians, whose inventions were for the most part lost for a long time to come through the ousting of this nation from commerce, its conquest by Alexander and its consequent decline. Likewise, for instance, glass-painting in the Middle Ages. Only when commerce has become world commerce, and has as its basis large-scale industry, when all nations are drawn into the competitive struggle, is the permanence of the acquired productive forces assured. (...) Competition soon compelled every country that wished to retain its historical role to protect its manufactures [sic] by renewed customs regulations (the old duties were no longer any good against big industry) and soon after to introduce big industry under protective duties. Big industry universalised competition in spite of these protective measures (it is practical free trade; the protective duty is only a palliative, a measure of defence within free trade), established means of communication and the modern world market, subordinated trade to itself, transformed all capital into industrial capital, and thus produced the rapid circulation (development of the financial system) and the centralisation of capital. By universal competition it forced all individuals to strain their energy to the utmost. It destroyed as far as possible ideology, religion, morality, etc. and where it could not do this, made them into a palpable lie. It produced world history for the first time, insofar as it made all civilised nations and every individual member of them dependent for the satisfaction of their wants on the whole world, thus destroying the former natural exclusiveness of separate nations. It made natural science subservient to capital and took from the division of labour the last semblance of its natural character. It destroyed natural growth in general, as far as this is possible while labour exists, and resolved all natural relationships into money relationships. In the place of naturally grown towns it created the modern, large industrial cities which have sprung up overnight. Wherever it penetrated, it destroyed the crafts and all earlier stages of industry. It completed the victory of the commercial town over the countryside. [Its first premise] was the automatic system. [Its development] produced a mass of productive forces, for which private [property] became just as much a fetter as the guild had been for manufacture and the small, rural workshop for the developing craft. These productive forces received under the system of private property a one-sided development only, and became for the majority destructive forces; moreover, a great multitude of such forces could find no application at all within this system. (...) from the conception of history we have sketched we obtain these further conclusions: (1) In the development of productive forces there comes a stage when productive forces and means of intercourse are brought into being, which, under the existing relationships, only cause mischief, and are no longer forces of production but forces of destruction (machinery and money); and connected with this a class is called forth, which has to bear all the burdens of society without enjoying its advantages, which, ousted from society, is forced into the most decided antagonism to all other classes; a class which forms the majority of all members of society, and from which emanates the consciousness of the necessity of a fundamental revolution, the communist consciousness, which may, of course, arise among the other classes too through the contemplation of the situation of this class. (From The German Ideology)

== Marxist–Leninist definition in the Soviet Union ==
The Institute of Economics of the Academy of Sciences of the U.S.S.R., textbook (1957, p xiv) says that "[t]he productive forces reflect the relationship of people to the objects and forces of nature used for the production of material wealth." (italics added) While productive forces are a human activity, the concept of productive forces includes the concept that technology mediates the human-nature relationship. Productive forces do not include the subject of labor (the raw materials or materials from nature being worked on). Productive forces are not the same thing as the means of production. Marx identified three components of production: human labor, subject of labor, and means of labor (1967, p 174). Productive forces are the union of human labor and the means of labor; means of production are the union of the subject of labor and the means of labor. (Institute of Economics of the Academy of Sciences of the U.S.S.R., 1957, p xiii).

On the other hand, The Great Soviet Encyclopedia (1969–1978) states:

Society's principal productive forces are people—the participants in social production, or the workers and the toiling masses in general (K. Marx and F. Engels, vol. 46, part 1, p. 403; V. I. Lenin, Poln. sobr. soch., 5th ed., vol. 38, p. 359). <…>

Through the purposeful expenditure of labor power in labor activity, human beings “objectify” or embody themselves in the material world. The material elements of the productive forces (the means of production and the means of consumption) are the product of human reason and labor. The means of production include the means of labor, which transmit human influence to nature, and the objects of labor, to which human labor is applied. The most important components of the means of labor are the instruments of labor (for example, tools, devices, and machines).

(From Productive forces. — The Great Soviet Encyclopedia: in 30 volumes. — Moscow: «Soviet Encyclopedia», 1969–1978.; English web-version of the article ; original version in Russian )

According to this, productive forces have such structure:

- People (human labour power)
- Means (the material elements of the productive forces)
  - Means of production
    - Means of labour
      - Instruments of labour
    - Objects of labour (also known as Subject of labour)
  - Means of consumption

The instruments of production wherewith material values are produced, the people who operate the instruments of production and carry on the production of material values thanks to a certain production experience and labor skill – all these elements jointly constitute the productive forces of society

— Joseph Stalin September 1938, Dialectical and Historical Materialism

Marxism in USSR served as core philosophical paradigm or platform, and had been developing as a science. So different views, hypotheses and approaches were widely discussed, tested and refined with time.

== Reification of technology ==
Other interpretations, sometimes influenced by postmodernism and the concept of commodity fetishism have by contrast emphasized the reification of the powers of technology, said to occur by the separation of technique from the producers, and by falsely imputing human powers to technology as autonomous force, the effect being a perspective of inevitable and unstoppable technological progress operating beyond any human control, and impervious to human choices.

In turn, this is said to have the effect of naturalising and legitimating social arrangements produced by people, by asserting that they are technically inevitable. The error here seems to be that social relations between people are confused and conflated with technical relations between people and things, and object relations between things; but this error is said to be a spontaneous result of the operation of a universal market and the process of commercialization.

== Productivity ==
Marx's concept of productive forces also has some relevance for discussions in economics about the meaning and measurement of productivity.

Modern economics theorises productivity in terms of the marginal product of the factors of production. Marx theorises productivity within the capitalist mode of production in terms of the social and technical relations of production, with the concept of the organic composition of capital and the value product. He suggests there is no completely neutral view of productivity possible; how productivity is defined depends on the values and interests people have. Thus, different social classes have different notions of productivity reflecting their own station in life, and giving rise to different notions of productive and unproductive labour.

== Chinese contexts ==
In 1984, Deng Xiaoping declared "the fundamental task for the socialist stage is to develop the productive forces". For Deng, "only by constantly developing the productive forces can a country gradually become strong and prosperous, with a rising standard of living."

Deng Xiaoping in 1988 described science and technology as the primary productive force. This idea was incorporated into Deng Xiaoping Theory.
