= Vladislav Ravdonikas =

Soviet Archeologist (1976–1894)

- Born: 9 December 1894; Tikhvin, Novgorod Governorate, Russian Empire
- Died: 28 November 1976 (aged 81); Leningrad, Russian SFSR, Soviet Union
- Education: St. Petersburg State University
- Known for: Marxist archaeology
- Awards: Order of the Red Banner of Labour
- Scientific career
- Fields: Archeology
- Workplaces: Institute of History of Leningrad University

Vladislav Iosifovich Ravdonikas (Russian: Владислав Иосифович Равдоникас; 9 December 1894 – 28 November 1976) was a Soviet archeologist.

== Life and career ==
Ravdonikas was born in to a Russified Lithuanian family. His father worked as a paramedic in a military hospital. Ravdonikas was orphaned at an early age and was raised by a teacher's family and received secondary education. He later studied at the Mikhailovsky Artillery School and was a participant in the First World War.

Ravdonikas enthusiastically accepted the October Revolution and was elected a delegate to Russian Congress of Soviets. He was Commander of the artillery battalion of the Red Army in the Karelo-Finnish front against the forces of Yudenich. In Tikhvin, he was in charge of the Pedagogical College, initiated the museum status of the monastery, and edited the county newspaper.

In 1922, he did not comply with the order of the Provincial Committee of the Russian Communist Party to move to Cherepovets for party work in the newspaper, as he wanted to dedicate himself to scientific work and teaching. He subsequently left the party and remained non-partisan for the rest of his life.

In the late 1920s, Ravdonikas' career began to take off rapidly. In 1929, he criticized the pre-revolutionary school of archeology and, through his work, began to introduce the ideas of Marxism into Soviet archeology. Over the next two decades, Ravdonikas studied the Mesolithic Oleneostrovsky burial ground discovered on Lake Onega. He described and published works on petroglyphs - rock carvings of Lake Onega and the White Sea. He organized excavations of the most ancient settlement in the North-West of Russia - Staraya Ladoga, and wrote the first Soviet textbook on the history of primitive society.

In the 1930s, Ravdonikas, already a professor and doctor of historical sciences, taught at Leningrad State University and headed the department of archeology at the university. Being a supporter of "Marrism", he retired from his scientific career in the late 1940s after being removed form most of his scientific posts. At that time, Ravdonikas was a corresponding member of the Soviet Academy of Sciences and a member of the Norwegian Academy of Sciences.

== Works and theories ==
Ravdonikas was the author of a number of works on the history of the north-west of Russia in antiquity and the Middle Ages (settlement of the Baltic-Finnish tribes, the formation of statehood in the region) and the theoretical problems of primitive society. He developed the theory of stadiality, at one time he was under the influence of "the new teaching of Nikolai Marr on language." In 1930, he published the polemical work "For a Marxist History of Material Culture", which called for a revision of the heritage of the old pre-revolutionary archeology and for the introduction of Marxist methods into science. He strove to move from a simple description and classification of things to the study of the socio-economic and socio-political problems of ancient societies. He actively participated in the theoretical discussions of the early 1930s. about the subject and essence of archeology, its relationship with other sciences.

In the 1930s explored the burial ground of the Mesolithic-Neolithic era of the Islands of Lake Onega, rock carvings (petroglyphs) of Lake Onega and the White Sea, medieval burial mounds and burial grounds of the Ladoga and Gatchina region, burial grounds and cave cities in the Crimea. He wrote a large monograph on the petroglyphs of the Karelia of the White Sea, interpreting their semantic meaning associated with the cults and beliefs of ancient sea animal hunters and fishermen. He saw in the petroglyphs not “pictures from nature”, but images that passed through the prism of primitive thinking and were significantly rethought at the same time. In his opinion, most of the figures, especially those of Onega, are images of a symbolic order, having solar and lunar semantics. In 1938, he began excavations of the Earthen settlement in Staraya Ladoga, which continued after the end of the war. He was also one of the founders of the leading serial publication "Soviet Archaeology" and played a decisive role in the formation of the Department of Archeology at Leningrad State University. His lecturers was very popular among the students of the Faculty of History. Ravdonikas wrote the first textbook in the Soviet Union on the history of primitive society.
