= Marxist archaeology =

Subfield using dialectical materialism

Marxist archaeology is an archaeological theory that interprets archaeological information using the framework of dialectical materialism, which is often short-handed as Marxism.

Although neither Karl Marx nor Friedrich Engels specifically analyzed how archaeology supported a materialist conception of history, Marx indicated as much in Capital, where he wrote that "relics of bygone instruments of labour possess the same importance for the investigation of extinct economic forms of society, as do fossil bones for the determination of extinct species of animals". Engels elaborated further that "it is from the history of nature and human society that the laws of dialectics are abstracted" which situates archaeology as part of that discovery process. Further, Engels sought to define three essential principles of dialectical materialist theory as "transformation of quantity into quality and vice versa; (...) the interpenetration of opposites; (and) the negation of the negation". Thus, Marxist archaeology examines the material record for indicators of the transformation of society and/or nature, and of the oppositional material and social forces that engender change, as frames for interpreting the archaeological record.

Marxian archaeological theory was developed by archaeologists in the Soviet Union during the early twentieth century. Marxist archaeology quickly became the dominant archaeological theory within the Soviet Union, and subsequently spread and was adopted by archaeologists in other countries, in particular, in the United Kingdom, where the theory was propagated by influential archaeologist V. Gordon Childe. With the rise of post-processual archaeology in the 1980s and 1990s, forms of Marxist archaeology were once more popularised amongst the archaeological community.

Marxist archaeology has been characterised as having "generally adopted a materialist base and a processual approach whilst emphasising the historical-developmental context of archaeological data." The theory argues that past societies should be examined through Marxist analysis, thereby having a materialistic basis. It holds that societal change comes about through class struggle, and while it may have once held that human societies progress through a series of stages, from primitive communism through slavery, feudalism and then capitalism, it is typically critical of such evolutionary typology today.

Marxist archaeologists in general believe that the bipolarism that exists between the processual and post-processual debates is an opposition inherent within knowledge production and is in accord with a dialectical understanding of the world. Many Marxist archaeologists believe that it is this polarization within the anthropological discipline (and all academic disciplines) that fuels the questions that spur progress in archaeological theory and knowledge. This constant interfacing and conflict between the extremes of the two heuristic playing grounds (subjective vs. objective) are believed to result in a continuous reconstruction of the past by scholars.

== Theory ==
=== Social evolution ===
The Marxist conception of history—which originated within Engels' The Origin of the Family, Private Property and the State (1884)—holds that society has evolved through a series of progressive stages. The first of these was primitive communism, which Marxist theorists believed was held by classless, hunter-gatherer societies. According to Marxist doctrine, most of these, however, evolved into slave-based societies, then to feudal societies, and then to capitalist societies, which Marxists note is the dominant form today. However, Marxists believe that there are in fact two more social stages for human society to progress through: socialism and then communism. Marxist archaeologists often interpret the archaeological record as displaying this progression through forms of society. This approach was particularly popular in the Soviet Union under Joseph Stalin, and as archaeologist Bruce Trigger later wrote:

The dogmatism with which Soviet social scientists adhered to this scheme contrasts sharply with the views expressed by Marx and Engels, who were prepared to consider multilinear models of social evolution, especially with regard to earlier and less well understood periods of human development.

=== Other ===
Marxist archaeology places an emphasis on learning how people lived and worked in the past. In attempting to do this, Marxist archaeologists working in the Soviet Union during the 1920s and following decades denounced what they saw as "artifactology", the simple categorization of artifacts in typologies, because they believed that it took archaeological focus away from the human beings who created and used them.

== History ==
=== Precedents ===
When they were formulating Marxism in the mid-nineteenth century, Karl Marx and Friedrich Engels wrote many books on the subject of history, but wrote little about archaeology, or how it could be understood within a Marxist framework. According to Trigger, the most relevant passage that Marx made about the subject was found in his epic study of political economy, Das Kapital, in which he had written that:

Relics of by-gone instruments of labour possess the same importance for the investigation of extinct economic forms of society, as do fossil bones for the determination of extinct species of animals. It is not the articles made, but how they are made, and by what instruments, that enables us to distinguish different economic epochs. Instruments of labour not only supply a standard of the degree of development to which human labour has attained, but they are also indicators of the social conditions under which labour is carried on.

=== In the Soviet Union ===
Marxist archaeology was first pioneered in the Soviet Union, a state run by a Marxist-Leninist government, during the 1920s. Upon taking power in the Russian Empire and reforming it as a socialist republic following the 1917 revolution, the Communist Party—as a part of their general support for scientific advancement—encouraged archaeological study, founding the Russian Academy for the History of Material Culture in 1919. Soon renamed the State Academy for the History of Material Culture (GAIMK) following the re-designation of the Empire as the Soviet Union, it was centred in Leningrad (now St. Petersburg), and initially followed pre-existing archaeological theories, namely culture-historical archaeology.

Following the ascent to power of Joseph Stalin in the Soviet Union in 1924, there was an increased focus on academics bringing their findings in line with Marxist theories. As a part of this, the government prevented Soviet archaeologists from contact with their foreign counterparts, and archaeologists were encouraged to understand their information within the framework of history developed by Marx and Engels. In 1929, a young archaeologist named Vladislav I. Ravdonikas (1894–1976) published a report entitled For a Soviet History of Material Culture in which he outlined a framework for Marxist archaeology. Within this work, the very discipline of archaeology was criticised as being inherently bourgeois and therefore anti-Marxist, and following its publication there was a trend to denounce those archaeological ideas and work that had gone before, exemplified at the Pan-Russian Conference for Archaeology and Ethnography held in 1930.

Soon, Ravdonikas and other young Marxist archaeologists rose to significant positions in the archaeological community of the Soviet Union, with notable Marxist archaeologists of this period including Artemiy Artsikhovsky, Yevgeni Krichevsky, A. P. Kruglow, G. P. Podgayetsky and P. N. Tret'yakov. According to later archaeologist Bruce Trigger, these young archaeologists "were enthusiastic, but not very experienced in Marxism or in archaeology." In the 1930s, the term "Soviet archaeology" was adopted in the country to differentiate Marxist archaeology as understood by Soviet archaeologists from the "bourgeois archaeology" of other, non-Marxist nations. Allying it firmly with the academic discipline of history, this decade saw the publication of many more archaeological books in the Union, as well as the start of what would become the country's primary archaeological journal, Sovetskaya arkheologiya, and the opening up of many more archaeological units in universities.

=== In Latin America ===
In Latin America, a form of Marxist archaeological thought known as "social archaeology" developed during the 1970s, based primarily in Peru and Venezuela but with some influence in Ecuador. It was pioneered by Luis Lumbreras in Peru and by Mario Sanoja and Iraida Vargas in Venezuela.

=== In the western world ===
In 1935, the influential Australian archaeologist Vere Gordon Childe visited the Soviet Union. Prior to this, he had already begun looking at societies from the perspective that they developed primarily through economic means, having begun to reject culture-historical archaeology in the late 1920s.

According to archaeologists Colin Renfrew and Paul Bahn, "Following the upsurge in theoretical discussion that followed the initial impact of the New Archaeology, there has been a reawakening of interest in applying to archaeology some of the implications of the earlier work of Karl Marx, many of which had been re-examined by French anthropologists in the 1960s and 1970s."

== Bibliography ==
- Engels, Frederich (1987). Dialectics of Nature. New York: International Publishers. ISBN 978-0-7178-0525-9.
- Marx, Karl (1996). Capital, a Critique of Political Economy. New York: International Publishers. ISBN 978-0-7178-0535-8.
- McGuire, Randall H. (1992). A Marxist Archaeology. San Diego: Academic Press Inc. ISBN 978-0124840782.
- McGuire, Randall H. (2008). Archaeology as Political Action. Berkeley: University of California Press.
- Trigger, Bruce G. (2007). A History of Archaeological Thought (2nd ed.). New York: Cambridge University Press. doi:10.1017/CBO9780511813016. ISBN 978-0-521-60049-1.
