= Subject of labor =

Subject of labor, or object of labor, is a concept in Marxist political economy that refers to "everything to which man's labor is applied". The subject of labor may be materials provided directly by nature like timber or coal, or materials that have been modified by labor. In the latter case, the subject of labor (e.g., yarn in a textile mill or semi-conductor chips in a computer assembly factory) are called "raw materials". This usage of the term "raw materials" is given in, for instance, in Capital, Part III.

The "subject of labor" is one of three basic factors of the production process, along with "human labor" and the "means of labor" (tools and infrastructure used to transform the subject of labor).

The subject of labor and the means of labor comprise the means of production of society.

"Subject of labor" is sometimes called "object of labor". In both cases, the term refers to what is being worked on.
