= Means of labor =

The means of labor (also called instruments of labor) is a concept in Marxist political economy that refers to "all those things with the aid of which man acts upon the subject of his labor, and transforms it." (Institute of Economics of the Academy of Sciences of the U.S.S.R., 1957) Means of labor include tools, machinery, buildings and land used for production, and infrastructure such as roads, telecommunications networks, and so forth. Labor, itself, defines "work, especially hard physical work."

The means of labor are one of three basic factors of production (Marx, 1967, p. 174), along with human labor and the subject of labor (the material worked on).

The means of labor and the subject of labor comprise the means of production of society.

In some formulations, the means of labor and human labor (including the activity itself as well as the laborer's skills and knowledge used in production) comprise the productive forces of society (e.g., Sheptulin, 1978). Other formulations define productive forces more narrowly as the union of instruments of production and the laborers who wield them (e.g., Institute of Economics, 1957), thereby excluding invested capital.
