= Rossiyskaya arkheologiya =

Rossiyskaya arkheologiya Российская археология
- Discipline: Archaeology
- Language: Russian (English abstracts)
- Edited by: L. A. Belyaev

Publication details
- Former name: Sovetskaya arkheologiya (Советская археология)
- History: 1957–present
- Publisher: Nauka (Russia)
- Frequency: Quarterly

Standard abbreviations
- ISO 4: Ross. Arkheol.

Indexing
- ISSN: 0869-6063
- OCLC no.: 715183492

Links
- Journal homepage

Rossiyskaya arkheologiya (Russian: Российская археология, lit. 'Russian archaeology'), formerly Sovetskaya arkheologiya (Russian: Советская археология, lit. 'Soviet archaeology'), is an academic journal dedicated to the subject of archaeology, published quarterly since 1957.

== See also ==
- Arheologia, Ukrainian journal of archaeology (since 1947)
