= Means of production =

Inputs used in the production of goods and services with economic value

In political philosophy, the means of production are the generally necessary assets and resources that enable a society to engage in production. While the exact resources encompassed may vary, they are widely agreed to include the classical factors of production (land, labor, and capital) as well as the general infrastructure and capital goods necessary to reproduce stable levels of productivity. The term means of production can also refer to the means of production and distribution, which additionally include the logistical distribution and delivery of products, generally through distributors; or the means of production, distribution, and exchange, which further include the exchange of distributed products, generally to consumers.

The concept of the means of production is used by researchers in various fields of study—including politics, economics, and sociology—to discuss, broadly, the relationship between anything that can have productive use, its ownership, and the constituent social parts needed to produce it.

== Industrial production ==
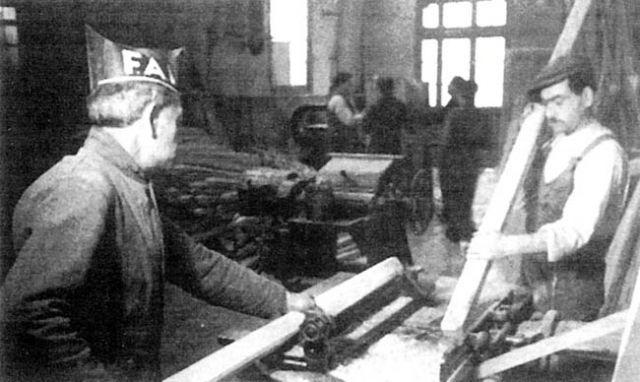
CNT-FAI worker cooperative in Barcelona producing wood and steel products

From the perspective of a firm, a firm uses its capital goods, which are also known as tangible assets as they are physical in nature. Unfinished goods are transformed into products and services in the production process. Even if capital goods are not traded on the market as consumer goods, they can be valued as long as capital goods are produced commodities, which are required for production. The total values of capital goods constitute the capital value.

The social means of production are capital goods and assets that require organized collective labor effort, as opposed to individual effort, to operate on. The ownership and organization of the social means of production is a key factor in categorizing and defining different types of economic systems.

The means of production include two broad categories of objects: instruments of labor (tools, factories, infrastructure, etc.) and subjects of labor (natural resources and raw materials). People operate on the subjects of labor using the instruments of labor to create a product; or stated another way, labor acting on the means of production creates a good. In an agrarian society, the principal means of production are the soil and the shovel. In an industrial society, the means of production become social means of production and include factories and mines.

== Knowledge production ==
In a knowledge economy, learning, research, development, innovation, ideas and creativity are the means of knowledge production; media such as books, articles, and videos disseminated both physically and digitally over the Internet are means of knowledge distribution. In a broad sense, the means of production also include the means of distribution and infrastructural capital such as stores, the internet and railroads.

== Depreciation ==
The means of production of a firm may depreciate, which means there is a loss in the economic value of capital goods or tangible assets such as machinery or factory equipment due to wear and tear, and aging. This is known as the depreciation of capital goods.

== Marxism and Marxist theory of class ==
The analysis of the technological sophistication of the means of production and how they are owned is a central component in the Marxist theoretical framework of historical materialism, in Marx's critique of political economy, and later in Marxian economics.

In Marx's work and subsequent developments in Marxist theory, the process of socioeconomic evolution is based on the premise of technological improvements in the means of production. As the level of technology improves with respect to productive capabilities, existing forms of social relations become superfluous and unnecessary as the advancement of technology integrated within the means of production contradicts the established organization of society and its economy.

The increasing efficiency of the means of production via the creation and adaptation of new technologies over time has a tendency to rearrange local and global market structures, leading to the disruption of existing profit pools, creating the possibility of massive economic impact. Disruptive technologies can lead to the devaluation of various forms of labor power, up to the point of making human labor power economically noncompetitive in certain applications, potentially widening income inequality.

According to Marx, escalating tension between the upper and lower class is a major consequence of technology decreasing the value of labor force and the contradictory effect an evolving means of production has on established social and economic systems. Marx believed increasing inequality between the upper and lower classes acts as a major catalyst of class conflicts, which develop to a point where the existing mode of production inevitably becomes unsustainable, either collapsing or being overthrown in a social revolution, at which point the contradictory relationship between technological advancement and the value of labor force is resolved by the emergence of a new mode of production based on a different set of social relations including, most notably, different patterns of ownership for the means of production.

Ownership of the means of production and control over the surplus product generated by their operation is the fundamental factor in delineating different modes of production. Capitalism is defined as private ownership and control over the means of production, where the surplus product becomes a source of unearned income for its owners. Under this system, profit-seeking individuals or organizations undertake a majority of economic activities. However, capitalism does not indicate all material means of production are privately owned as partial economies are publicly owned.

=== Determinant of class ===
Marx's theory of class defines classes in their relation to their ownership and control of the means of production. In a capitalist society, the bourgeoisie, or the capitalist class, is the class that owns the means of production and derives a passive income from their operation. Examples of the capitalist class include business owners, shareholders and the minority of people who own factories, machinery and lands. Countries considered as the capitalist countries include Australia, Canada, the U.S., and other nations which hold a free market economy. In modern society, small business owners, minority shareholders and other smaller capitalists are considered as Petite bourgeoisie according to Marx's theory, which is distinct from bourgeoisie and proletariat as they can buy the labor of others but also work along with employees.

In contrast, the proletariat, or working class, comprises the majority of the population that lacks access to the means of production and are therefore induced to sell their labor power for a wage or salary to gain access to necessities, goods and services.

According to Marx, wages and salaries are considered the price of labor power, related to working hours or outputs produced by the labor force. At the company level, an employee does not control and own the means of production in a capitalist mode of production. Instead, an employee is performing specific duties under a contract of employment, working for wages or salaries. As for firms and profit-seeking organizations, from a personnel economics perspective, to maximize efficiency and productivity there must be an equilibrium between labor markets and product markets. In human resource practices, compensation structure tends to shift towards pay-for-performance bonus or incentive pay rather than base salary to attract the right workers, even if conflicts of interest exist in an employer-worker relationship.

To the question of why classes exist in human societies in the first place, Karl Marx offered a historical and scientific explanation that it was the cultural practice of ownership of the means of production that gives rise to them. This explanation differs dramatically from other explanations based on "differences in ability" between individuals or on religious or political affiliations giving rise to castes. This explanation is consistent with the bulk of Marxist theory in which politics and religion are seen as mere outgrowths (superstructures) of the basic underlying economic reality of a people.

== Related terms ==
Factors of production are defined by German philosopher Karl Marx in his book Das Kapital as labor, subjects of labor, and instruments of labor: the term is equivalent to means of production plus labor. The factors of production are often listed in economic writings derived from the classical school as "land, labor and capital". Marx sometimes used the term "productive forces" equivalently with "factors of production"; in Kapital, he uses "factors of production", in his preface to his critique of political economy, A Contribution to the Critique of Political Economy, he uses "productive forces" (that may depend on the translation).

Production relations (German: Produktionsverhältnis) are the relations humans enter into with each other in using the means of production to produce. Examples of such relations are employer/employee, buyer/seller, the technical division of labor in a factory, and property relations.

A mode of production (German: Produktionsweise) is the dominant way in which production is organized in society. For instance, "capitalism" is the term for the capitalist mode of production in which the means of production are owned privately by a small class (the bourgeoisie) who profits off the labor of the working class (the proletariat). Communism is a mode of production in which the means of production are not owned by anyone, but shared in common, without class-based exploitation. Besides capitalism and communism, there is another mode of production which is called a Mixed Economic System. In a mixed economy, private ownership of capital goods are protected and a certain level of the market economy is allowed. However, the government has the right to intervene in the market and economic activities for social objectives. Different from the pure capitalism, the government regulation exists to control particular means of production over the private business sector. Different from communism, the majority of means of production are privately owned rather than shared in common.

== See also ==
- Capital (economics)
- Clause IV
- Factors of production
- Information revolution
- Gross fixed capital formation
- Nationalization
- Productive forces
- Property
- Private property
- Privatization
- Relations of production
- Socialization (economics)

== Footnotes ==
Nolan P. K Lenski 2009
