= Commodity fetishism =

Concept in Marxist analysis

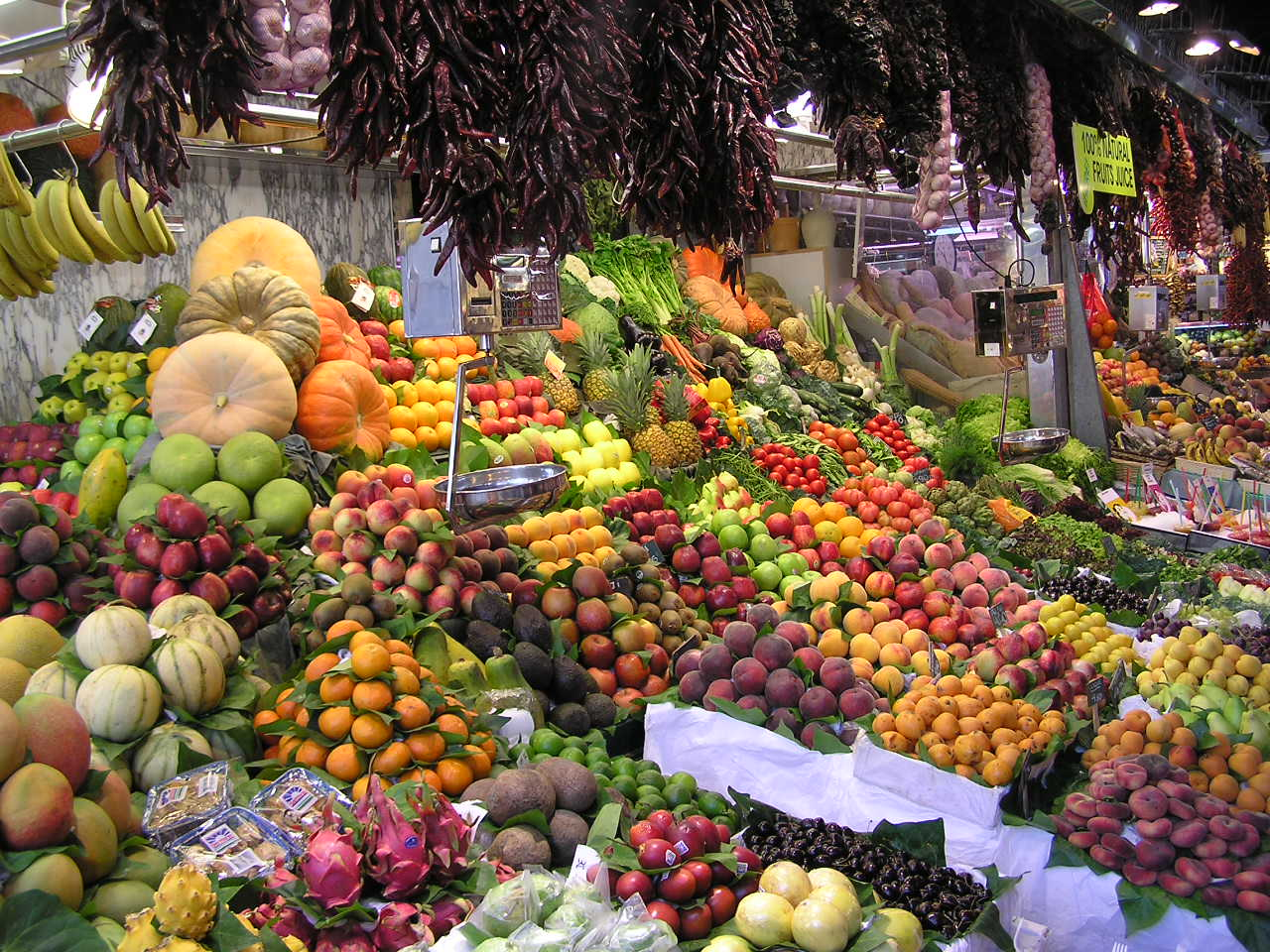
Commodity fetishism: In the economics of the marketplace, producers and consumers perceive each other by means of the money and goods that they exchange.

In Marxist philosophy, commodity fetishism (German: Warenfetischismus) is a belief that social aspects of economic goods are inherent to them, rather than being expressions of social relations in which goods and their underlying labour are exchanged. Through commodity fetishism, social phenomena such as market value, wages and rent are reified (attributed to things, i.e. goods, labour, land) while people who determine them—traders, capitalists, landlords—are made to seem passive or obscured altogether. The concept is crucial to Karl Marx's critique of economic theory, which seeks to locate the source of profit in the capitalist economy.

== Concept ==
In the first chapter of Capital: A Critique of Political Economy (1867), commodity fetishism is used to explain how the social organization of labour manifests in the buying and selling of commodities (goods and services). In the marketplace, social relations among people—who makes what, who works for whom, the production-time for a commodity, etc.—are represented as social relations among objects.

In the process of commercial exchange, commodities appear in a depersonalized form, obscuring the social relations inherent to their production. Marx explained the sociology of commodity fetishism:

As against this, the commodity-form, and the value-relation of the products of labour, within which it appears, have absolutely no connection with the physical nature of the commodity and the material relations arising out of this. It is nothing but the definite social relation, between men, themselves, which assumes here, for them, the fantastic form of a relation between things. In order, therefore, to find an analogy, we must take flight into the misty realm of religion. There the products of the human brain appear as autonomous figures endowed with a life of their own, which enter into relations, both with each other and with the human race. So it is in the world of commodities with the products of men's hands. I call this the fetishism which attaches itself to the products of labour as soon as they are produced as commodities, and is, therefore, inseparable from the production of commodities.

According to Marx, the operation of commodity fetishism requires the owners of capital to actively ignore or maintain an indifference to the relational whole that produces a commodity.

== Development ==
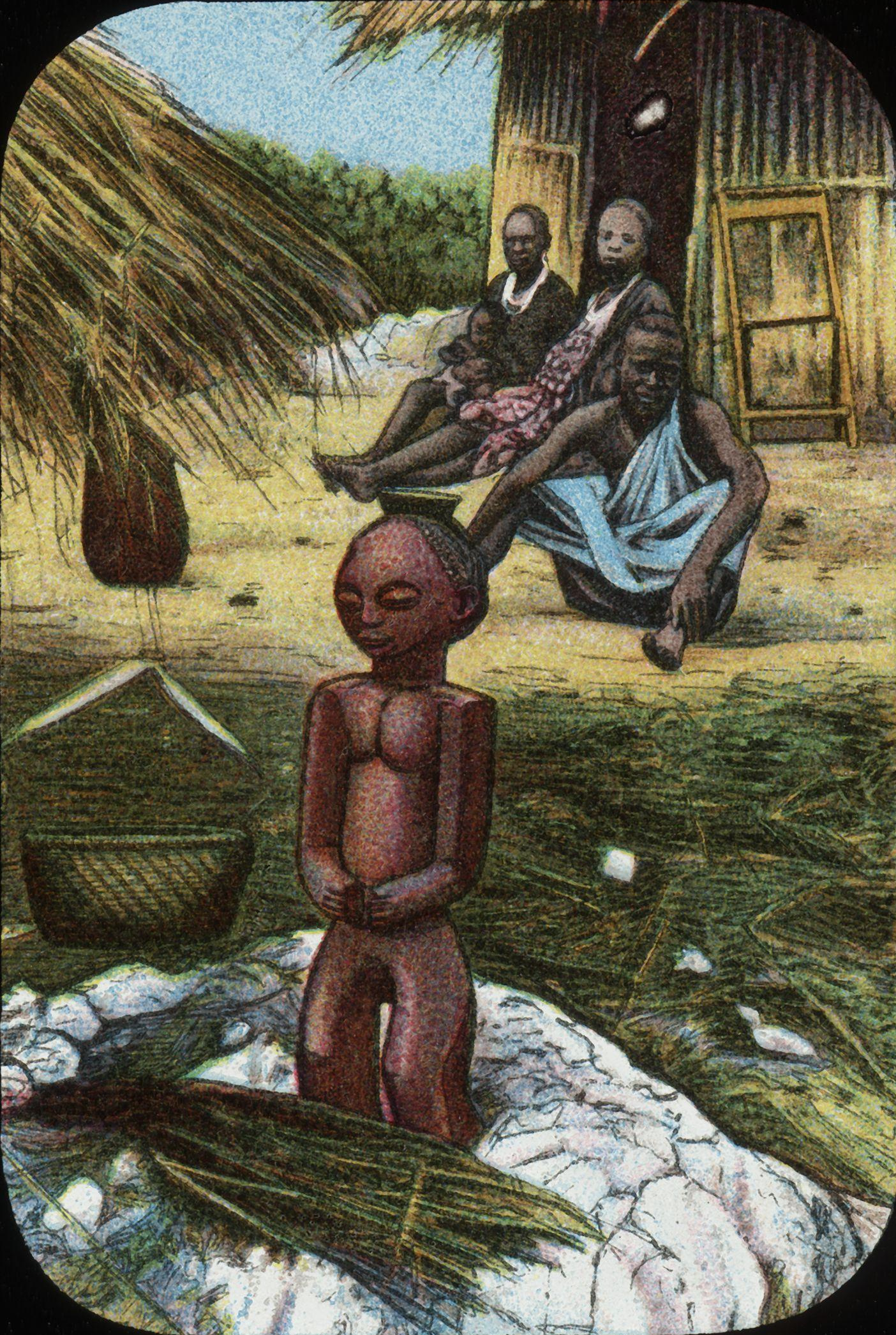
A South African fetish figurine whose supernatural powers protect the owner and kin in the natural world (c. 1900)

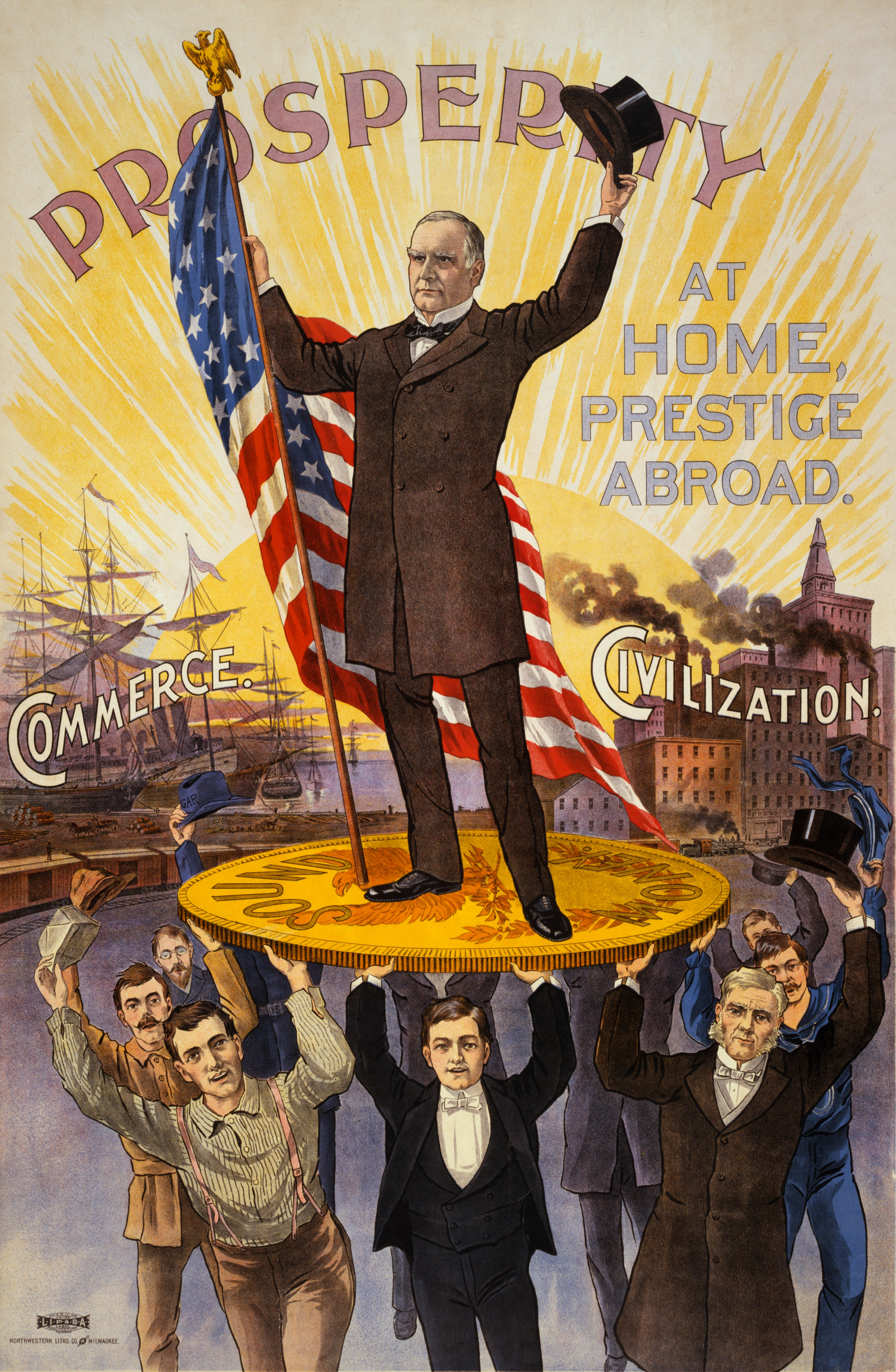
A political poster shows gold coin as the basis of prosperity (c. 1896).

The theory of commodity fetishism (German: Warenfetischismus) originated from Karl Marx's references to fetishes and fetishism in his analyses of religious superstition, and in the criticism of the beliefs of political economists. Marx borrowed the concept of "fetishism" from The Cult of Fetish Gods (1760) by Charles de Brosses, which proposed a materialist theory of the origin of religion. Moreover, in the 1840s, the philosophic discussion of fetishism by Auguste Comte, and Ludwig Feuerbach's psychological interpretation of religion also influenced Marx's development of commodity fetishism.

Marx's first mention of fetishism appeared in 1842, in his response to a newspaper article by Karl Heinrich Hermes that proposed to censor "philosophical and religious" arguments from newspapers. Hermes agreed with the German philosopher Hegel in regarding fetishism as the crudest form of religion. Marx dismissed that argument and Hermes's definition of religion as that which elevates man "above sensuous appetites". Instead, Marx said that fetishism is "the religion of sensuous appetites", and that the fantasy of the appetites tricks the fetish worshipper into believing that an inanimate object will yield its natural character to gratify the desires of the worshipper. Therefore, the crude appetite of the fetish worshipper smashes the fetish when it ceases to be of service.

Marx returned to the theme later that year when commenting on Rhineland legislative debates that established complex penalties for the formerly legal gathering of wood in private forests. He attacked the laws as justifiable only if the wood itself were held sacred:

The savages of Cuba regarded gold as a fetish of the Spaniards. They celebrated a feast in its honour, sang in a circle around it, and then threw it into the sea. If the Cuban savages had been present at the sitting of the Rhine Province Assembly, would they not have regarded wood as the Rhinelanders' fetish? But a subsequent sitting would have taught them that the worship of animals is connected with this fetishism, and they would have thrown the hares into the sea in order to save the human beings.

In the Economic and Philosophic Manuscripts of 1844, Marx spoke of the European fetish of precious-metal money:

The nations which are still dazzled by the sensuous glitter of precious metals, and are, therefore, still fetish-worshippers of metal money, are not yet fully developed money-nations. [Note the] contrast of France and England. The extent to which the solution of theoretical riddles is the task of practice, and is effected through practice, the extent to which true practice is the condition of a real and positive theory, is shown, for example, in fetishism. The sensuous consciousness of the fetish-worshipper is different from that of the Greek, because his sensuous existence is different. The abstract enmity between sense and spirit is necessary so long as the human feeling for nature, the human sense of nature, and, therefore, also the natural sense of man, are not yet produced by man's own labour.

In the ethnological notebooks, he commented upon the archaeological reportage of The Origin of Civilization and the Primitive Condition of Man: Mental and Social conditions of Savages (1870), by John Lubbock. In the Outlines of the Critique of Political Economy (Grundrisse, 1859), he criticized the liberal arguments of the French economist Frédéric Bastiat; and about fetishes and fetishism Marx said:

In real history, wage labour arises out of the dissolution of slavery and serfdom—or of the decay of communal property, as with Oriental and Slavonic peoples—and, in its adequate, epoch-making form, the form which takes possession of the entire social being of labour, out of the decline and fall of the guild economy, of the system of Estates, of labour and income in kind, of industry carried on as rural subsidiary occupation, of small-scale feudal agriculture, etc. In all these real historic transitions, wage labour appears as the dissolution, the annihilation of relations in which labour was fixed on all sides, in its income, its content, its location, its scope, etc. Hence, as negation of the stability of labour and of its remuneration. The direct transition from the African's fetish to Voltaire's "Supreme Being", or from the hunting gear of a North American savage to the capital of the Bank of England, is not so absurdly contrary to history, as is the transition from Bastiat's fisherman to the wage labourer.

In A Contribution to the Critique of Political Economy (1859), Marx referred to A Discourse on the Rise, Progress, Peculiar Objects, and Importance of Political Economy (1825), by John Ramsay McCulloch, who said that "In its natural state, matter ... is always destitute of value", with which Marx concurred, saying that "this shows how high even a McCulloch stands above the fetishism of German 'thinkers' who assert that 'material', and half a dozen similar irrelevancies are elements of value".

Furthermore, in the manuscript of "Results of the Immediate Process of Production" (c. 1864), an appendix to Capital: Critique of Political Economy, Volume 1 (1867), Marx said that:

... we find in the capitalist process of production [an] indissoluble fusion of use-values in which capital subsists [as] means of production and objects defined as capital, when what we are really faced with is a definite social relationship of production. In consequence, the product embedded in this mode of production is equated with the commodity, by those who have to deal with it. It is this that forms the foundation for the fetishism of the political economists.

Hence did Karl Marx apply the concepts of fetish and fetishism, derived from economic and ethnologic studies, to the development of the theory of commodity fetishism, wherein an economic abstraction (value) is psychologically transformed (reified) into an object, which people choose to believe has an intrinsic value, in and of itself.

== Critique ==
=== In the critique of political economy ===
Marx proposed that, in a society where independent, private producers trade their products with each other, of their own volition and initiative, and without much coordination of market exchange, the volumes of production and commercial activities are adjusted in accordance with the fluctuating values of the products (goods and services) as they are bought and sold, and in accordance with the fluctuations of supply and demand. Because their social coexistence, and its meaning, is expressed through market exchange (trade and transaction), people have no other relations with each other. Therefore, social relations are continually mediated and expressed with objects (commodities and money). How the traded commodities relate will depend upon the costs of production, which are reducible to quantities of human labour, although the worker has no control over what happens to the commodities that they produce. (See: Entfremdung, Marx's theory of alienation)

=== Domination of things ===
The concept of the intrinsic value of commodities (goods and services) determines and dominates the economic (business) relationships among people, to the extent that buyers and sellers continually adjust their beliefs (financial expectations) about the value of things—either consciously or unconsciously—to the proportionate price changes (market value) of the commodities over which buyers and sellers believe they have no true control. That psychologic perception transforms the trading-value of a commodity into an independent entity (an object), to the degree that the social value of the goods and services appears to be a natural property of the commodity itself. Thence objectified, the market appears as if self-regulated (by fluctuating supply and demand) because, in pursuit of profit, the consumers of the products ceased to perceive the human co-operation among capitalists that is the true engine of the market where commodities are bought and sold; such is the domination of things in the market.

=== Objectified value ===
The value of a commodity originates from the human being's intellectual and perceptual capacity to consciously (subjectively) ascribe a relative value (importance) to a commodity, the goods and services manufactured by the labour of a worker. Therefore, in the course of the economic transactions (buying and selling) that constitute market exchange, people ascribe subjective values to the commodities, which the buyers and the sellers then perceive as objective values, the market-exchange prices that people will pay for the commodities.

=== Naturalization of market behaviour ===
In a capitalist society, the human perception that "the market" is an independent, sentient entity, is how buyers, sellers, and producers naturalize market exchange (the human choices and decisions that constitute commerce) as a series of "natural phenomena ... that ... happen of their own accord". Such were the political-economy arguments of the economists whom Karl Marx criticized when they spoke of the "natural equilibria" of markets, as if the price (value) of a commodity were independent of the volition and initiative of the capitalist producers, buyers, and sellers of commodities.

In the 18th century, the Scottish social philosopher and political economist Adam Smith, in The Wealth of Nations (1776) proposed that the "truck, barter, and exchange" activities of the market were corresponding economic representations of human nature, that is, the buying and selling of commodities were activities intrinsic to the market, and thus are the "natural behaviour" of the market. Hence, Smith proposed that a market economy was a self-regulating entity that "naturally" tended towards economic equilibrium, wherein the relative prices (the value) of a commodity ensured that the buyers and sellers obtained what they wanted for and from their goods and services.

In the 19th century, Karl Marx contradicted the artifice of Adam Smith's "naturalisation of the market's behaviour" as a politico-ideologic apology—by and for the capitalists—which allowed human economic choices and decisions to be misrepresented as fixed "facts of life", rather than as the human actions that resulted from the will of the producers, the buyers, and the sellers of the commodities traded at market. Such "immutable economic laws" are what Capital: Critique of Political Economy (1867) revealed about the functioning of the capitalist mode of production, how goods and services (commodities) are circulated among a society; and thus explain the psychological phenomenon of commodity fetishism, which ascribes an independent, objective value and reality to a thing that has no inherent value—other than the value given to it by the producer, the seller, and the buyer of the commodity.

=== Masking ===
In a capitalist economy, a character mask (German: Charaktermaske) is the functional role with which a person relates and is related to in a society composed of stratified social classes, especially in relationships and market-exchange transactions; thus, in the course of buying and selling, the commodities (goods and services) usually appear other than they are, because they are masked (obscured) by the role-playing of the buyer and the seller. Moreover, because the capitalist economy of a class society is an intrinsically contradictory system, the masking of the true socio-economic character of the transaction is an integral feature of its function and operation as market exchange. In the course of business competition among themselves, buyers, sellers, and producers cannot do business (compete) without obscurity—confidentiality and secrecy—thus the necessity of the character masks that obscure true economic motive.

Central to the Marxist critique of political economy is the obscurantism of the juridical labour contract, between the worker and the capitalist, that masks the true, exploitive nature of their economic relationship—that the worker does not sell his and her labour, but that the worker sells individual labour power, the human capacity to perform work and manufacture commodities (goods and services) that yield a profit to the producer. The work contract is the mask that obscures the economic exploitation of the difference between the wages paid for the labour of the worker, and the new value created by the labour of the worker.

Marx thus established that in a capitalist society the creation of wealth is based upon "the paid and unpaid portions of labour [that] are inseparably mixed up with each other, and the nature of the whole transaction is completely masked by the intervention of a contract, and the pay received at the end of the week"; and that:

Vulgar economics actually does nothing more than to interpret, to systematize and turn into apologetics—in a doctrinaire way—the ideas of the agents who are trapped within bourgeois relations of production. So it should not surprise us that, precisely within the estranged form of appearance of economic relations in which these prima facie absurd and complete contradictions occur—and all science would be superfluous if the form of appearance of things directly coincided with their essence—that precisely here vulgar economics feels completely at home, and that these relationships appear all the more self-evident to it, the more their inner interconnection remains hidden to it, even though these relationships are comprehensible to the popular mind.

— Capital, Volume III.

=== Opacity of economic relations ===
The primary valuation of the trading-value of goods and services (commodities) is expressed as money-prices. The buyers and the sellers determine and establish the economic and financial relationships; and afterwards compare the prices in and the price trends of the market. Moreover, because of the masking of true economic motive, neither the buyer, nor the seller, nor the producer perceive and understand every human labour-activity required to deliver the commodities (goods and services), nor do they perceive the workers whose labour facilitated the purchase of commodities. The economic results of such collective human labour are expressed as the values and the prices of the commodities; the value-relations between the amount of human labour and the value of the supplied commodity.

=== Capitalism as religion ===
In the essay "Capitalism as Religion" (1921), Walter Benjamin said that whether or not people treat capitalism as a religion was a moot subject, because "One can behold in capitalism a religion, that is to say, capitalism essentially serves to satisfy the same worries, anguish, and disquiet formerly answered by so-called religion." That the religion of capitalism is manifest in four tenets:

1. "Capitalism is a purely cultic religion, perhaps the most extreme that ever existed"
2. "The permanence of the cult"
3. "Capitalism is probably the first instance of a cult that creates guilt, not atonement"
4. "God must be hidden from it, and may be addressed only when guilt is at its zenith".

== Applications ==
=== Cultural theory ===
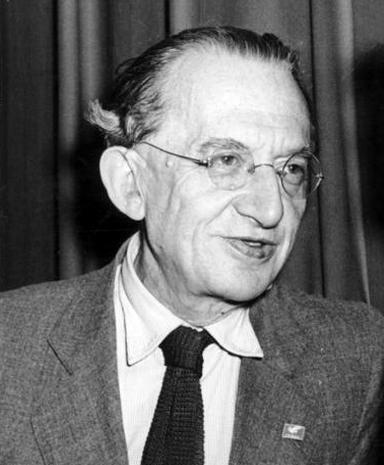
The Hungarian philosopher György Lukács developed Karl Marx's theory of commodity fetishism to develop reification theory.

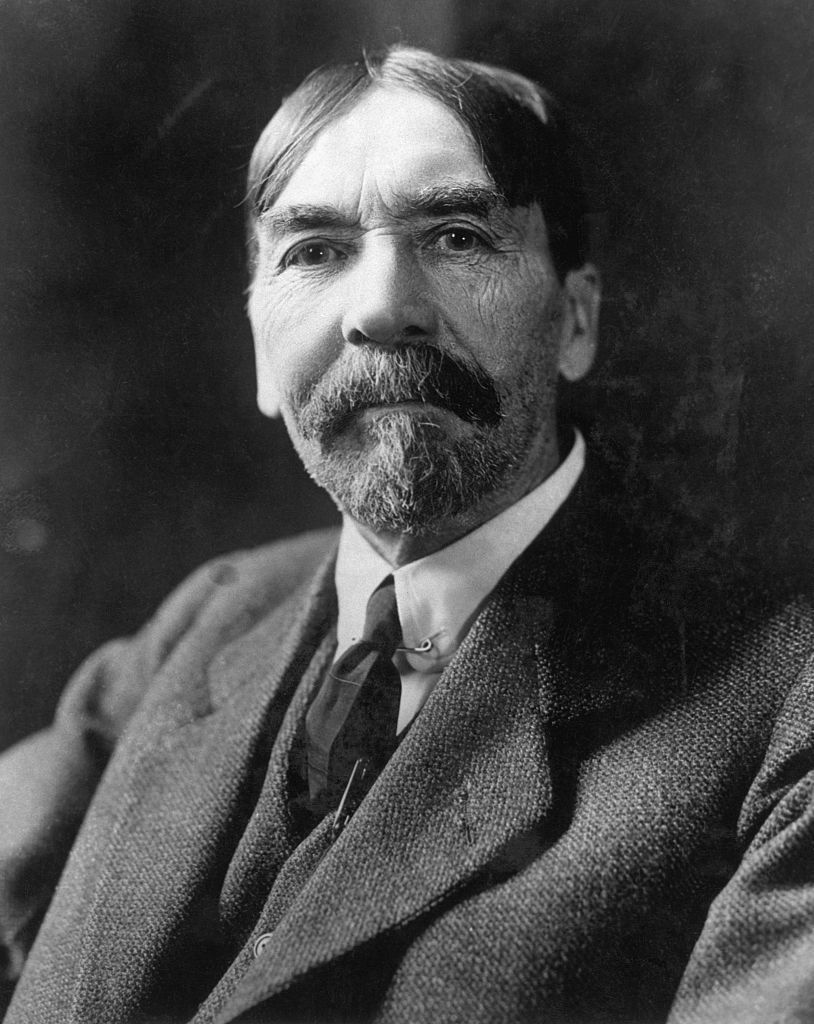
Thorstein Veblen proposed the conspicuous consumption of commodities as the pursuit of social prestige.

Since the 19th century, when Karl Marx presented the theory of commodity fetishism, in Section 4, "The Fetishism of Commodities and the Secret thereof", of the first chapter of Capital: Critique of Political Economy (1867), the constituent concepts of the theory, and their sociologic and economic explanations, have proved intellectually fertile propositions that permit the application of the theory (interpretation, development, adaptation) to the study, examination, and analysis of other cultural aspects of the political economy of capitalism, such as:

==== Social prestige ====
At the end of the 19th century, Thorstein Veblen (The Theory of the Leisure Class: An Economic Study of Institutions, 1899) developed the social status (prestige) relationship between the producer of consumer goods and the aspirations to prestige of the consumer. To avoid the status anxiety of not being of or belonging to "the right social class", the consumer establishes a personal identity (social, economic, cultural) that is defined and expressed by the commodities (goods and services) that they buy, own, and use; the domination of things that communicate the "correct signals" of social prestige, of belonging. (See: Conspicuous consumption.)

==== Reification ====
In History and Class Consciousness (1923), György Lukács started from the theory of commodity fetishism for his development of reification (the psychological transformation of an abstraction into a concrete object) as the principal obstacle to class consciousness. About which Lukács said: "Just as the capitalist system continuously produces and reproduces itself economically on higher levels, the structure of reification progressively sinks more deeply, more fatefully, and more definitively into the consciousness of Man"—hence, commodification pervaded every conscious human activity, as the growth of capitalism commodified every sphere of human activity into a product that can be bought and sold in the market. (See: Verdinglichung, Marx's theory of reification.)

==== Industrialized culture ====
Commodity fetishism is theoretically central to the Frankfurt School philosophy, especially in the work of the sociologist Theodor W. Adorno, which describes how the forms of commerce invade the human psyche; how commerce casts a person into a role not of his or her making; and how commercial forces affect the development of the psyche. In the book Dialectic of Enlightenment (1944), Adorno and Max Horkheimer presented the Theory of the Culture Industry to describe how the human imagination (artistic, spiritual, intellectual activity) becomes commodified when subordinated to the "natural commercial laws" of the market.

To the consumer, the cultural goods and services sold in the market appear to offer the promise of a richly developed and creative individuality, yet the inherent commodification severely restricts and stunts the human psyche, so that the man and the woman consumer has little "time for myself", because of the continual personification of cultural roles over which he and she exercise little control. In personifying such cultural identities, the person is a passive consumer, not the active creator, of his or her life; the promised life of individualistic creativity is incompatible with the collectivist, commercial norms of bourgeois culture.

==== Commodity narcissism ====
In the study From Commodity Fetishism to Commodity Narcissism (2012) the investigators applied the Marxist theory of commodity fetishism to psychologically analyse the economic behaviour (buying and selling) of the contemporary consumer. With the concept of commodity narcissism, the psychologists Stephen Dunne and Robert Cluley proposed that consumers who claim to be ethically concerned about the manufacturing origin of commodities, nonetheless behaved as if ignorant of the exploitative labour conditions under which the workers produced the goods and services, bought by the "concerned consumer"; that, within the culture of consumerism, narcissistic men and women have established shopping (economic consumption) as a socially acceptable way to express aggression. Researchers find no evidence that a greater manufacturing base can spur economic growth, while improving government effectiveness and regulation quality are more promising for facilitating economic growth.

==== Ethical consumption ====
Environmentally "conscious" consumers want their purchased products to be environmentally ethical. According to James G. Carrier, on a personal level their purchases can make them feel more positively moral and second they can help put pressure on firms in a competitive market to change the way they do things. Marx's 1867 notion of commodity fetishism which concerns the idea that ethical consumption is going beyond the two reasons first noted by Carrier. Certain commodities are perceived in a particular way that the consumer ignores or denies the labor time entailed in the process of production or for that matter any detailed background people and process that is viable in creating an ethical product. Capitalists have the intention of selling to an audience with commercial gain - the use of nature as a strategy is vital in urging people to buy their product. Ethical consumption is mostly concerned with the social, political and environmental context of objects - and consumers want a product that meets their moral criteria, something non-exploitative. These baseline concepts need to be visible and eye-catching with recognizable verifications. This is very common in ecotourism who produce eco-friendliness as a reason to buy and visit. Advertising protection and conservation attracts visitors and media attention. These capitalists make no point to vary in their images and photographs or captions - the repetition of nature is always colorful and vibrant, gentle and reserved. They are "fetishizing" nature as a marketing technique. Portraying themselves as a business that protects nature satisfies their clientele so that the consumer cannot see the objects and mechanisms used to actually produce it. Carrier describes how the environment itself is fetishized as a consumable product through parks and other areas of land being used as bodies or images attached to promises of natural experiences or protection efforts in return for money. Carrier also offers the example of fair-trade coffee as a way that commodity fetishism is seen in ethical consumption. If fair-trade coffee promises that it is direct, cooperative supply chain between growers and consumers through images of coffee growers and messaging on the bag of coffee, this becomes more relevant to consumer decision making than the reality that many other "middle-men" were needed in the roasting, packaging, marketing, and transportation of that commodity.

Ethical consumption is believed by advocates of the theory to allow people to lead more moral lives as well as affect the world by placing economic pressure on firms to change their production processes and products to become more ethical to remain competitive within the greater market. The fetishization of nature and natural resources often leads through its commodification as a product to be advertised. Conceptual categories need to be "legible, be visible and recognizable" in order to be effective as ethical standards. The advertising on items listed and named as fair trade often misrepresents the actual production process, especially in products requiring extensive and hard labor to produce, such as coffee. It also often becomes exploitative as it uses the images of ethnic small holders rather than the ethnic migrants and wage laborers who do the majority of the work. The use of images not only fetishizes the product, but defines ethicality as a whole. A common narrative now is whether or not ethical consumption is at all possible in a globalized world of highly interconnected capitalism and trade. It relies on ideas of greenwashing in which producers use environmentalism and fair trade ideals to advertise their products without living up to the ideals. The false image of environmentalism disguises the unsustainable practices being utilized. Another critique is the overall effectiveness of individual consumer choices without large-scale systemic change through government regulation. Accessibility is another issue, as ethical products are often more expensive and less accessible to low-income activists.

==== Social alienation ====
In The Society of the Spectacle (1967), Guy Debord presented the theory of "le spectacle"—the systematic conflation of advanced capitalism, the mass communications media, and a government amenable to exploiting those factors. The spectacle transforms human relations into objectified relations among images, and vice versa; the exemplar spectacle is television, the communications medium wherein people passively allow (cultural) representations of themselves to become the active agents of their beliefs. The spectacle is the form that society assumes when the Arts, the instruments of cultural production, have been commodified as commercial activities that render an aesthetic value into a commercial value (a commodity). Whereby artistic expression then is shaped by the person's ability to sell it as a commodity, that is, as artistic goods and services.

Capitalism reorganizes personal consumption to conform to the commercial principles of market exchange; commodity fetishism transforms a cultural commodity into a product with an economic "life of its own" that is independent of the volition and initiative of the artist, the producer of the commodity. What Karl Marx critically anticipated in the 19th century, with "The Fetishism of Commodities and the Secret thereof", Guy Debord interpreted and developed for the 20th century—that in modern society, the psychologic intimacies of intersubjectivity and personal self-relation are commodified into discrete "experiences" that can be bought and sold. The Society of the Spectacle is the ultimate form of social alienation that occurs when a person views his or her being (self) as a commodity that can be bought and sold, because they regard every human relation as a (potential) business transaction. (See: Entfremdung, Marx's theory of alienation)

==== Semiotic sign ====
Jean Baudrillard applied commodity fetishism to explain the subjective feelings of men and women towards consumer goods in the "realm of circulation"; that is, the cultural mystique (mystification) that advertising ascribed to the commodities (goods and services) in order to encourage the buyer to purchase the goods and services as aids to the construction of his and her cultural identity. In the book For a Critique of the Political Economy of the Sign (1972), Baudrillard developed the semiotic theory of "the Sign" (sign value) as a development of Marx's theory of commodity fetishism and of the exchange value vs. use value dichotomy of capitalism.

=== Intellectual property ===
In the 21st century, the political economy of capitalism reified the abstract objects that are information and knowledge into the tangible commodities of intellectual property, which are produced by and derived from the labours of the intellectual and the white collar workers.

==== Philosophic base ====
The economist Michael Perelman critically examined the belief systems from which arose intellectual property rights, the field of law that commodified knowledge and information. Samuel Bowles and Herbert Gintis critically reviewed the belief systems of the theory of human capital. Knowledge, as the philosophic means to a better life, is contrasted with capitalist knowledge (as commodity and capital), produced to generate income and profit. Such commodification detaches knowledge and information from the (user) person, because, as intellectual property, they are independent, economic entities.

==== Knowledge: authentic and counterfeit ====
In Postmodernism, or, the Cultural Logic of Late Capitalism (1991), the Marxist theorist Fredric Jameson linked the reification of information and knowledge to the post-modern distinction between authentic knowledge (experience) and counterfeit knowledge (vicarious experience), which usually is acquired through the mass communications media. In Critique of Commodity Aesthetics: Appearance, Sexuality and Advertising in Capitalist Society (1986), the philosopher Wolfgang Fritz Haug presents a "critique of commodity aesthetics" that examines how human needs and desires are manipulated and reshaped for commercial gain.

==== Financial risk management ====
The sociologists Frank Furedi and Ulrich Beck studied the development of commodified types of knowledge in the business culture of "risk prevention" in the management of money. The Post–World War II economic expansion (c. 1945–1973) created very much money (capital and savings), while the dominant bourgeois ideology of money favoured the risk-management philosophy of the managers of investment funds and financial assets. From such administration of investment money, manipulated to create new capital, arose the preoccupation with risk calculations, which subsequently was followed by the "economic science" of risk prevention management. In light of which, the commodification of money as "financial investment funds" allows an ordinary person to pose as a rich person, as an economic risk-taker able to risk losing money invested to the market. Hence, the fetishization of financial risk as "a sum of money" is a reification that distorts the social perception of the true nature of financial risk, as experienced by ordinary people. Moreover, the valuation of financial risk is susceptible to ideological bias; that contemporary fortunes are achieved from the insight of experts in financial management, who study the relationship between "known" and "unknown" economic factors, by which human fears about money can be manipulated and exploited.

==== Commodified art ====
The cultural critics Georg Simmel and Walter Benjamin examined and described the fetishes and fetishism of art, by means of which "artistic" commodities are produced for sale in the market, and how commodification determines and establishes the value of the artistic commodities (goods and services) derived from legitimate Art; for example, the selling of an artist's personal effects as "artistic fetishes".

==== Legal traducement ====
In the field of law, the scholar Evgeny Pashukanis (The General Theory of Law and Marxism, 1924), the Austrian politician Karl Renner, the German political scientist Franz Leopold Neumann, the British socialist writer China Miéville, the labour-law attorney Marc Linder, and the American legal philosopher Duncan Kennedy (The Role of Law in Economic Theory: Essays on the Fetishism of Commodities, 1985) have respectively explored the applications of commodity fetishism in their contemporary legal systems, and reported that the reification of legal forms misrepresents social relations.

==== Data economy ====
More recently, the Marxist concept has been used to understand the dynamics of the digital economy. Brazilian legal scholar Giovanna Diniz Eduardo brings the debate up to date by demonstrating how fetishism operates on individuals’ information on the internet. Diniz points out that, under surveillance capitalism, personal data is stripped of its human and subjective dimension and treated as mere commodities with assigned prices. Just as Marx highlighted the concealment of labor relations behind physical objects, the author argues that the contemporary fetish hides the complex processes of extraction, processing, and algorithmic exploitation, making the circulation of data appear to be a natural and autonomous consequence of technological mediation, rather than a relationship of economic exploitation.

== Criticism of commodity fetishism ==
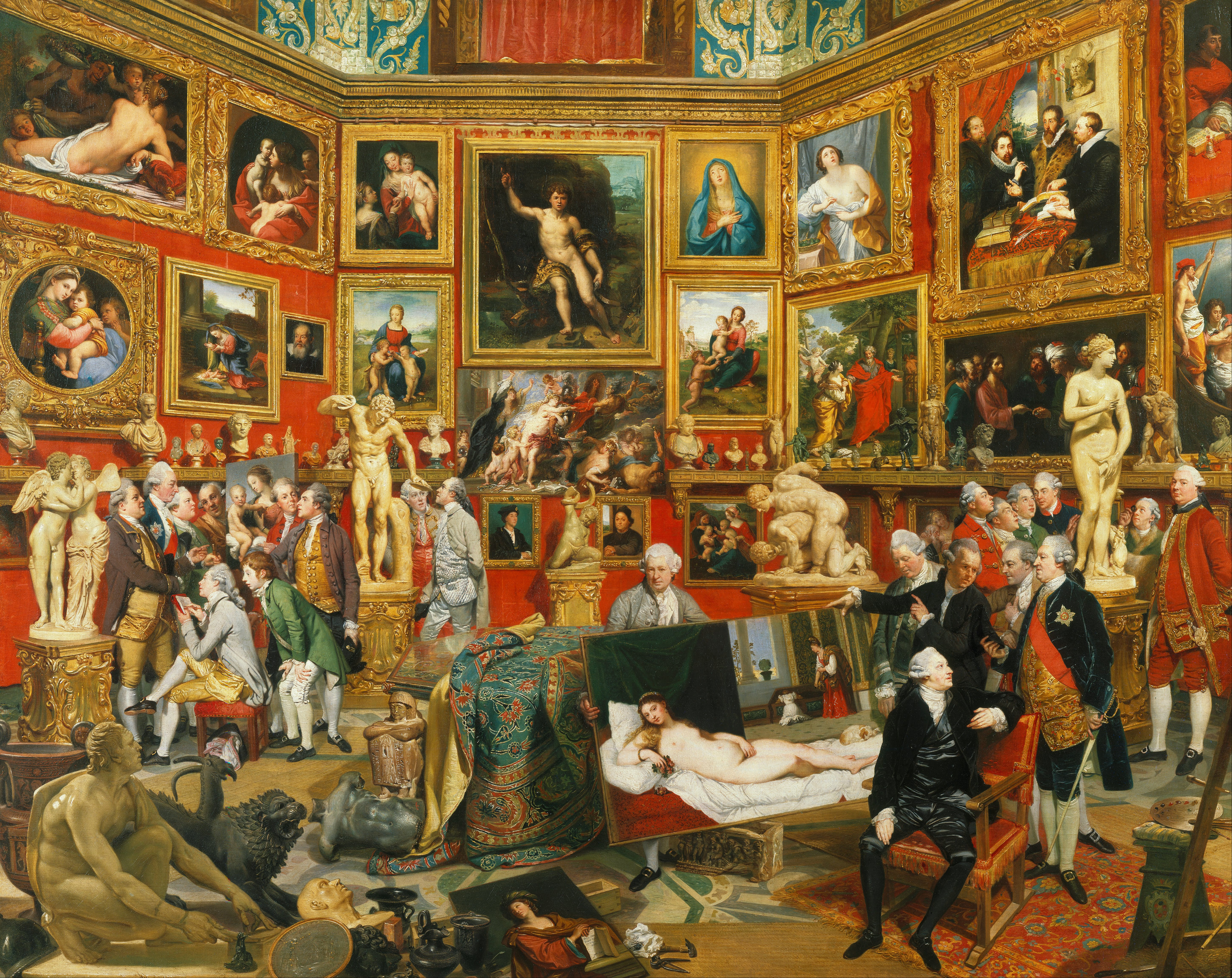
The Tribuna of the Uffizi (1772–1778) by Johann Zoffany depicts the commodity-fetishism metamorphosis of oil paintings into culture-industry products.

In Portrait of a Marxist as a Young Nun (1988), Professor Helena Sheehan said that the analogy between religious faith and commodity fetishism is a mistaken interpretation, because people do not worship commodities (money and merchandise) by attributing supernatural powers to inanimate objects, to a fetish. That the belief that value-relationships inherent to a commodity described is not religious belief, because value-relations do not possess the psychological characteristics of spiritual beliefs. That interpretation is proved by the possibility of a person's possessing religious faith, whilst being aware of the psychology of commodity fetishism, and thus being critical of the fetishization of money and merchandise, thus, a person's disbelief in the golden calf is integral to the person's iconoclasm against the idolatry of money.

== See also ==
Pre-Marxist theories

- Simple living

Marxist theories pertinent to the theory of commodity fetishism

- Commodity (Marxism)
- Critique of political economy
- Exchange value
- False consciousness
- Fetishism
- Labor theory of value
- Law of value
- Real prices and ideal prices
- Reification (Marxism)
- Relations of production
- Use value
- Value-form

Post-Marxist theories derived from the theory of commodity fetishism

- Essays of Marx's Theory of Value by Isaak Illich Rubin
- History and Class Consciousness, "Reification and the Consciousness of the Proletariat" (theories of class consciousness and of reification) by Geörg Lukács
- The Society of the Spectacle by Guy Debord (full text)
- The System of Objects by Jean Baudrillard
- Neomaterialism by Joshua Simon
- Time, Labor and Social Domination by Moishe Postone
- Value criticism (in German Wertkritik)
