= Jean Baudrillard =

French sociologist and philosopher (1929–2007)

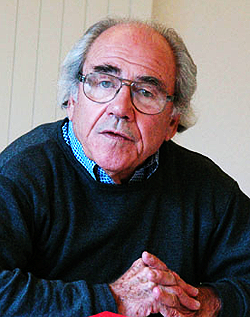
- Baudrillard in 2004 at the European Graduate School
- Born: 27 July 1929; Reims, France
- Died: 6 March 2007 (aged 77); Paris, France

Education
- Education: University of Paris (Ph.D, 1966)
- Thesis: The System of Objects (1966)
- Doctoral advisor: Henri Lefebvre

Philosophical work
- Era: 20th-/21st-century philosophy
- Region: Western philosophy
- School: Continental philosophy; post-Marxism; 'pataphysics; post-structuralism; postmodernism
- Institutions: Paris X Nanterre; European Graduate School
- Main interests: Semiotics; Social philosophy
- Notable ideas: Hyperreality; Sign value

Jean Baudrillard (UK: /ˈboʊdrɪjɑːr/, US: /ˌboʊdriˈɑːr/; French: [ʒɑ̃ bodʁijaʁ]; 27 July 1929 – 6 March 2007) was a French sociologist and philosopher with an interest in cultural studies. He is best known for his analyses of media, contemporary culture, and technological communication, as well as his formulation of concepts such as hyperreality. Baudrillard wrote about diverse subjects, including consumerism, critique of economy, social history, aesthetics, Western foreign policy, and popular culture.

Among his best-known works are Forget Foucault (1977), Seduction (1978), Simulacra and Simulation (1981), America (1986), and The Gulf War Did Not Take Place (1991). His work is frequently associated with postmodernism and specifically post-structuralism. Nevertheless, Baudrillard had opposed post-structuralism and distanced himself from postmodernism, skeptical of it really existing

== Biography ==
Baudrillard was born in Reims, northeastern France, on 27 July 1929. His grandparents were farm workers and his father a gendarme. During high school, at the Lycée at Reims, he became aware of 'pataphysics, a parody of the philosophy of science, via philosophy professor Emmanuel Peillet (1914–1973), which is said to be crucial for understanding Baudrillard's later thought. He became the first of his family to attend university when he moved to Paris to attend the Sorbonne. There he studied German language and literature, which led him to begin teaching the subject at several different lycées, both Parisian and provincial, from 1960 until 1966.

=== Teaching career ===
While teaching, Baudrillard began to publish reviews of literature and translated the works of such authors as Peter Weiss, Bertolt Brecht, Karl Marx, Friedrich Engels, and Wilhelm Emil Mühlmann. While teaching German, Baudrillard began to transfer to sociology, eventually completing in 1966 a Doctorat de troisième cycle (broadly equivalent to a PhD) at the University of Paris with his thesis Le Système des Objets (The System of Objects) under the supervision of Henri Lefebvre, Roland Barthes, and Pierre Bourdieu; the thesis was published as a book in 1968. He began teaching Sociology at the Paris X Nanterre, a university campus just outside Paris which became heavily involved in the uprising of May 1968.

At Nanterre he took up a position as Maître Assistant (Assistant Professor), then Maître de Conférences (Associate Professor). He completed his habilitation accreditation, a formal French post‑doctoral qualification required to supervise doctoral candidates or hold a full professorship, in 1986, which led to the publication of his reflective book L'Autre par lui-même (The Other by Himself) by Éditions Galilée in early 1987. Following his habilitation, he became a full professor at Nanterre.

In 1970, Baudrillard made the first of his many trips to the United States (Aspen, Colorado), and in 1973, the first of several trips to Kyoto, Japan. He was given his first camera in 1981 in Japan, which led to him becoming a photographer. In 1986, he moved to IRIS (Institut de Recherche et d'Information Socio-Économique) at the Université de Paris-IX Dauphine, where he spent the latter part of his teaching career. During this time he began to move away from sociology as a discipline, particularly in its "classical" form, and, after ceasing to teach full-time, he rarely identified himself with any particular discipline, although he remained linked to academia. During the 1980s and 1990s his books gained a wide audience, and in his last years he became, to an extent, an intellectual celebrity, being published often in the French- and English-speaking popular press.

He nonetheless continued supporting the Institut de Recherche sur l'Innovation Sociale at the Centre National de la Recherche Scientifique and was Satrap at the Collège de 'Pataphysique. Baudrillard taught at the European Graduate School in Saas-Fee, Switzerland, and collaborated at the Canadian theory, culture, and technology review CTheory, where he was abundantly cited. He also purportedly participated in the International Journal of Baudrillard Studies, as of 2022 hosted on Bishop's University domain, from its inception in 2004 until his death.

In 1999–2000, his photographs were exhibited at the Maison européenne de la photographie in Paris. In 2004, Baudrillard attended the major conference on his work, "Baudrillard and the Arts", at the Center for Art and Media Karlsruhe in Karlsruhe, Germany.

=== Personal life ===
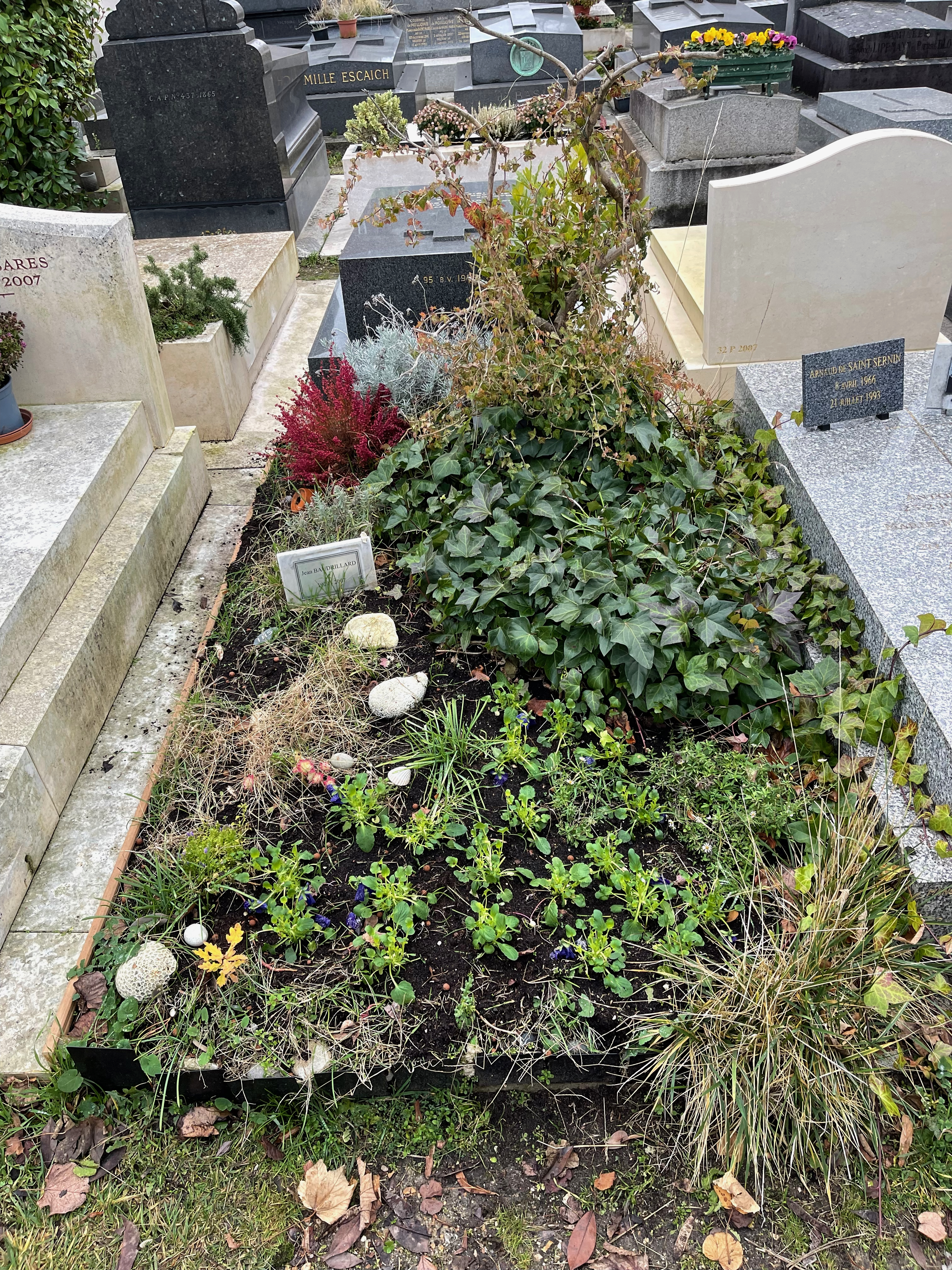
Jean Baudrillard's grave with flowers and vines planted and growing over it in Montparnasse Cemetery, Paris, France

Baudrillard enjoyed renaissance and baroque music; a favorite composer was Claudio Monteverdi. He also favored rock music such as The Velvet Underground & Nico. Baudrillard did his writing using "his old typewriter, never at the computer". He has stated that a computer is not "merely a handier and more complex kind of typewriter", and with a typewriter he has a "physical relation to writing".

Baudrillard was married twice. He and his first wife Lucile Baudrillard had two children, Gilles and Anne. Not much is known about their relationship, or why they separated. In 1970, while working as a professor at the University of Paris-Nanterre, 41-year-old Baudrillard met 25-year-old Marine Dupuis, who had just come back from a sailing trip around the world with her then-boyfriend. In 1994, more than 20 years later, Jean and Marine got married. Marine went on to be a journalist and media artistic director.

Diagnosed with cancer in 2005, Baudrillard battled the disease for two years from his apartment on Rue Sainte-Beuve, Paris, dying at the age of 77. Marine Baudrillard curates Cool Memories, an association of Jean Baudrillard's friends.

== Key concepts ==
Baudrillard belonged to a generation of French thinkers including Gilles Deleuze, Jean-François Lyotard, Michel Foucault, Jacques Derrida, and Jacques Lacan who all shared an interest in semiotics, and his earlier work is often seen as a part of the post-structuralist philosophical school. However, Baudrillard consistently distanced himself from disciplinary classifications later in life, describing himself as "neither a philosopher nor a sociologist", and adding that he didn't "recognize [himself] in sociology or philosophizing philosophy."

James M. Russell in 2015 stated that "In common with many post-structuralists, his arguments consistently draw upon the notion that signification and meaning are both only understandable in terms of how particular words or 'signs' interrelate". Baudrillard thought, as do many post-structuralists, that meaning is brought about through systems of signs working together. Following on from the structuralist linguist Ferdinand de Saussure, Baudrillard argued that meaning (value) is created through difference—through what something is not (so "dog" means "dog" because it is not-"cat", not-"goat", not-"tree", etc.). In fact, he viewed meaning as near enough self-referential: objects, images of objects, words and signs are situated in a web of meaning; one object's meaning is only understandable through its relation to the system of other objects; for instance, one thing's prestige relates to another's mundanity.

From this starting point Baudrillard theorized broadly about human society based upon this kind of self-referentiality. His writing portrays societies always searching for a sense of meaning—or a "total" understanding of the world—that remains consistently elusive. Baudrillard developed theories in which the excessive, fruitless search for total knowledge leads almost inevitably to a kind of delusion. In Baudrillard's view, the (human) subject may try to understand the (non-human) object, but because the object can only be understood according to what it signifies (and because the process of signification immediately involves a web of other signs from which it is distinguished) this never produces the desired results.

The subject is, rather, seduced (in the original Latin sense: seducere, 'to lead away') by the object. He argued therefore that, in the final analysis, a complete understanding of the minutiae of human life is impossible, and when people are seduced into thinking otherwise they become drawn toward a "simulated" version of reality, or, to use one of his neologisms, a state of "hyperreality". This is not to say that the world becomes unreal, but rather that the faster and more comprehensively societies begin to bring reality together into one supposedly coherent picture, the more insecure and unstable it looks and the more fearful societies become. Reality, in this sense, "dies out".

Russell states that Baudrillard argues that "in our present 'global' society, technological communication has created an excessive proliferation of meaning. Because of this, meaning's self-referentiality has prompted, not a 'global village', but a world where meaning has been obliterated" Accordingly, Baudrillard argued that the excess of signs and of meaning in late 20th century "global" society had caused (quite paradoxically) an effacement of reality. In this world neither liberal nor Marxist utopias are any longer believed in. We live, he argued, not in a "global village", to use Marshall McLuhan's phrase, but rather in a world that is ever more easily petrified by even the smallest event. Because the "global" world operates at the level of the exchange of signs and commodities, it becomes ever more blind to symbolic acts such as, for example, terrorism.

In Baudrillard's work the symbolic realm (which he develops a perspective on through the anthropological work of Marcel Mauss and Georges Bataille) is seen as quite distinct from that of signs and signification. Signs can be exchanged like commodities; symbols, on the other hand, operate quite differently: they are exchanged, like gifts, sometimes violently as a form of potlatch. Baudrillard, particularly in his later work, saw the "global" society as without this "symbolic" element, and therefore symbolically (if not militarily) defenseless against acts such as the Rushdie Fatwa or, indeed, the September 11 terrorist attacks against the United States and its military and economic establishment.

=== Value criticism ===
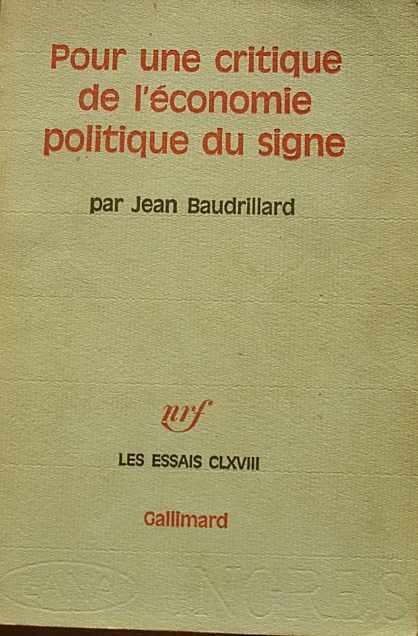
Book cover, Éditions Gallimard

In his early books, such as The System of Objects, For a Critique of the Political Economy of the Sign, and The Consumer Society, Baudrillard's main focus is upon consumerism, and how different objects are consumed in different ways. At this time Baudrillard's political outlook was loosely associated with Marxism (and Situationism), but in these books he differed from Karl Marx in one significant way. For Baudrillard, as for the situationists, it was consumption rather than production that was the main driver of capitalist society.

Baudrillard came to this conclusion by criticising Marx's concept of "use-value". Baudrillard thought that both Marx's and Adam Smith's economic thought accepted the idea of genuine needs relating to genuine uses too easily and too simply. Baudrillard argued, drawing from Georges Bataille, that needs are constructed, rather than innate. He stressed that all purchases, because they always signify something socially, have their fetishistic side. Objects always, drawing from Roland Barthes, "say something" about their users. And this was, for him, why consumption was and remains more important than production: because the "ideological genesis of needs" precedes the production of goods to meet those needs.

He wrote that there are four ways of an object obtaining value. The four value-making processes are:

1. The functional value: an object's instrumental purpose (use value). Example: a pen writes; a refrigerator cools.
2. The exchange value: an object's economic value. Example: One pen may be worth three pencils, while one refrigerator may be worth the salary earned by three months of work.
3. The symbolic value: an object's value assigned by a subject in relation to another subject (i.e., between a giver and receiver). Example: a pen might symbolize a student's school graduation gift or a commencement speaker's gift; or a diamond may be a symbol of publicly declared marital love.
4. The sign value: an object's value within a system of objects. Example: a particular pen may, while having no added functional benefit, signify prestige relative to another pen; a diamond ring may have no function at all, but may suggest particular social values, such as taste or class.

Baudrillard's earlier books were attempts to argue that the first two of these values are not simply associated, but are disrupted by the third and, particularly, the fourth. Later, Baudrillard rejected Marxism totally (The Mirror of Production and Symbolic Exchange and Death). But the focus on the difference between sign value (which relates to commodity exchange) and symbolic value (which relates to Maussian gift exchange) remained in his work up until his death. Indeed, it came to play a more and more important role, particularly in his writings on world events.

=== Simulacra and Simulation ===
As Baudrillard developed his work throughout the 1980s, he moved from economic theory to mediation and mass communication. Although retaining his interest in Saussurean semiotics and the logic of symbolic exchange (as influenced by anthropologist Marcel Mauss), Baudrillard turned his attention to the work of Marshall McLuhan, developing ideas about how the nature of social relations is determined by the forms of communication that a society employs. In so doing, Baudrillard progressed beyond both Saussure's and Roland Barthes's formal semiology to consider the implications of a historically understood version of structural semiology.

According to Kornelije Kvas, "Baudrillard rejects the structuralist principle of the equivalence of different forms of linguistic organization, the binary principle that contains oppositions such as: true-false, real-unreal, center-periphery. He denies any possibility of a (mimetic) duplication of reality; reality mediated through language becomes a game of signs. In his theoretical system all distinctions between the real and the fictional, between a copy and the original, disappear".

Simulation, Baudrillard claims, is the current stage of the simulacrum: all is composed of references with no referents, a hyperreality. Baudrillard argues that this is part of a historical progression. In the Renaissance, the dominant simulacrum was in the form of the counterfeit, where people or objects appear to stand for a real referent that does not exist (for instance, royalty, nobility, holiness, etc.). With the Industrial Revolution, the dominant simulacrum becomes the product, which can be propagated on an endless production line. In current times, the dominant simulacrum is the model, which by its nature already stands for endless reproducibility, and is itself already reproduced.

=== The end of history and meaning ===
Throughout the 1980s and 1990s, one of Baudrillard's most common themes was historicity, or, more specifically, how present-day societies use the notions of progress and modernity in their political choices. He argued, much like the political theorist Francis Fukuyama, that history had ended or "vanished" with the spread of globalization; but, unlike Fukuyama, Baudrillard averred that this end should not be understood as the culmination of history's progress,

The aim of this world order [...] is, in a sense, the end of history, not on the basis of a democratic fulfillment, as Fukuyama has it, but on the basis of preventive terror, of a counter-terror that puts an end to any possible events.

— Baudrillard, The Intelligence of Evil or the Lucidity Pact . New York: Berg Publishing, 2005, Translated by Chris Turner

but as the collapse of the very idea of historical progress. For Baudrillard, the end of the Cold War did not represent an ideological victory; rather, it signaled the disappearance of utopian visions shared between both the political Right and Left. Giving further evidence of his opposition toward Marxist visions of global communism and liberal visions of global civil society, Baudrillard contended that the ends they hoped for had always been illusions; indeed, as The Illusion of the End argues, he thought the idea of an end itself was nothing more than a misguided dream:

The end of history is, alas, also the end of the dustbins of history. There are no longer any dustbins for disposing of old ideologies, old regimes, old values. Where are we going to throw Marxism, which actually invented the dustbins of history? (Yet there is some justice here since the very people who invented them have fallen in.) Conclusion: if there are no more dustbins of history, this is because History itself has become a dustbin. It has become its own dustbin, just as the planet itself is becoming its own dustbin.

Within a society subject to and ruled by fast-paced electronic communication and global information networks the collapse of this façade was always going to be, he thought, inevitable. Employing a quasi-scientific vocabulary that attracted the ire of the physicist Alan Sokal, Baudrillard wrote that the speed society moved at had destabilized the linearity of history: "we have the particle accelerator that has smashed the referential orbit of things once and for all."

Russell stated that this "approach to history demonstrates Baudrillard's affinities with the postmodern philosophy of Jean-François Lyotard", who argued that in the late 20th century there was no longer any room for "metanarratives". (The triumph of a coming communism being one such metanarrative.) But, in addition to simply lamenting this collapse of history, Baudrillard also went beyond Lyotard and attempted to analyse how the idea of positive progress was being employed in spite of the notion's declining validity.

Baudrillard argued that although genuine belief in a universal endpoint of history, wherein all conflicts would find their resolution, had been deemed redundant, universality was still a notion used in world politics as an excuse for actions. Universal values which, according to him, no one any longer believed were universal and are still rhetorically employed to justify otherwise unjustifiable choices. The means, he wrote, are there even though the ends are no longer believed in, and are employed to hide the present's harsh realities (or, as he would have put it, unrealities). "In the Enlightenment, universalization was viewed as unlimited growth and forward progress. Today, by contrast, universalization is expressed as a forward escape." This involves the notion of "escape velocity" as outlined in The Illusion of the End, which results in the postmodern fallacy of escape velocity on which the postmodern mind and critical view cannot, by definition, ever truly break free from the all-encompassing "self-referential" sphere of discourse.

== Political commentary ==
=== On the Bosnian War ===
Baudrillard reacted to the West's indifference to the Bosnian War in writings, mostly in essays in his column for Libération. More specifically, he expressed his view on Europe's unwillingness to respond to "aggression and genocide in Bosnia", in which "New Europe" revealed itself to be a "sham." He criticized the Western media and intellectuals for their passivity, and for taking the role of bystanders, engaging in ineffective, hypocritical and self-serving action, and the public for its inability to distinguish simulacra from real world happenings, in which real death and destruction in Bosnia seemed unreal. He was determined in his columns to openly name the perpetrators, Serbs, and call their actions in Bosnia aggression and genocide.

Baudrillard heavily criticized Susan Sontag for directing a production of Waiting for Godot in war-torn Sarajevo during the siege. (Note: Baudrillard (trans. Chris Turner): even Susan Sontag [...] came to stage Waiting for Godot in Sarajevo. [...] the worst part [...] [is] the condescending attitude and the misconception regarding where strength and weakness lie. They are the strong ones. It is we who are weak, going over there searching for somethin g to compensate for our weakness and loss of reality. [...] In her opinion pieces, Susan Sontag confesses that the Bosnians do not really believe in the distress all around them [...] find the whole situation unreal, senseless, unintelligible. It is [...] an almost hyperreal hell [partly due to] media and humanitarian harassment [...] But Susan Sontag, who is from New York, must know better than they do what reality is because she has chosen them to embody it. [...] And Susan Sontag comes to convince them [...] of the 'reality' of their suffering, by culturalizing it, of course, by theatricalizing it so that it can serve as a point of reference in the theatre of Western values, one of which is solidarity. Yet Susan Sontag herself is not the issue. She is merely fashionably emblematic of what has now become a widespread situation, in which harmless, powerless intellectuals trade their woes with the wretched [...] Not so long ago, we saw Bourdieu and the Abbe Pierre offering themselves up in televisual sacrifice, trading off between them the pathos-laden language and the sociological metalanguage of misery.) (Note: Baudrillard (trans. Patrice Riemens): [...]Susan Sontag [...] came to have "Waiting for Godot" played in Sarajevo [...][...] the worse [sic] [...] is about the condescending manner in making out what is strength & [sic] what is weakness. They are strong. It is us who are weak and who go there to make good for our loss of strength and sense of reality. [...] Susan Sontag herself confesses in her diaries that the Bosnians do not really believe in the suffering which surrounds them [...] finding the whole situation unreal, senseless, and unexplainable. It is [...] hell of [...] a hyperreal kind, made even more hyperreal by the harassment of the media and the humanitarian agencies [...] But then Susan Sontag, hailing herself from New York, must know better than them what reality is, since she has chosen them to incarnate it [...] Susan Sontag comes to convince them of the "reality" of their suffering, by making something cultural and something theatrical out of it, so that it can be useful as a referent within the theatre of western values, including "solidarity". But Susan Sontag herself is not the issue. She is merely a societal instance of [...] the general situation whereby toothless intellectuals swap their distress with the misery of the poor [...] Thus, not so long ago, one could witness Bourdieu and Abbe Pierre offering themselves as televisual slaughtering lambs trading with each other pathetic language and sociological garble about poverty.)

=== On the Persian Gulf War ===
Baudrillard's provocative 1991 book, The Gulf War Did Not Take Place, raised his public profile as an academic and political commentator. He argued that the first Gulf War was the inverse of the Clausewitzian formula: not "the continuation of politics by other means", but "the continuation of the absence of politics by other means." Accordingly, Saddam Hussein was not fighting the Coalition, but using the lives of his soldiers as a form of sacrifice to preserve his power. The Coalition fighting the Iraqi military was merely dropping 10,000 tonnes of bombs daily, as if proving to themselves that there was an enemy to fight.

So, too, were the Western media complicit, presenting the war in real time, by recycling images of war to propagate the notion that the U.S.-led Coalition and the Iraqi government were actually fighting, but, such was not the case. Saddam Hussein did not use his military capacity (the Iraqi Air Force). His power was not weakened, evinced by his easy suppression of the 1991 internal uprisings that followed afterwards. Over all, little had changed. Saddam remained undefeated, the "victors" were not victorious, and thus there was no war—i.e., the Gulf War did not occur.

The book was originally a series of articles in the British newspaper The Guardian and the French newspaper Libération, published in three parts: "The Gulf War Will Not Take Place," published during the American military and rhetorical buildup; "The Gulf War Is Not Taking Place," published during military action; and "The Gulf War Did Not Take Place" published afterwards.

Some critics, like Christopher Norris accused Baudrillard of instant revisionism; a denial of the physical action of the conflict (which was related to his denial of reality in general). Consequently, Baudrillard was accused of lazy amoralism, cynical scepticism, and Berkelian subjective idealism. Sympathetic commentators such as William Merrin, in his book Baudrillard and the Media, have argued that Baudrillard was more concerned with the West's technological and political dominance and the globalization of its commercial interests, and what that means for the present possibility of war. Merrin argued that Baudrillard was not denying that something had happened, but merely questioning whether that something was in fact war or a bilateral "atrocity masquerading as a war". Merrin viewed the accusations of amorality as redundant and based on a misreading. In Baudrillard's own words:

Saddam liquidates the communists, Moscow flirts even more with him; he gases the Kurds, it is not held against him; he eliminates the religious cadres, the whole of Islam makes peace with him. […] Even […] the 100,000 dead will only have been the final decoy that Saddam will have sacrificed, the blood money paid in forfeit according to a calculated equivalence [...] to preserve his power. What is worse is that these dead still serve as an alibi for those who do not want to have been excited for nothing: at least these dead will prove this war was indeed a war and not shameful and pointless.

=== On the terrorist attacks of 11 September 2001 ===
In his essay, "The Spirit of Terrorism", Baudrillard characterises the terrorist attacks of 11 September 2001 on the World Trade Center in New York City as the "absolute event". Baudrillard contrasts the "absolute event" of 11 September 2001 with "global events", such as the death of Diana, Princess of Wales and the World Cup. The essay culminates in Baudrillard regarding the U.S.-led Gulf War as a "non-event", or an "event that did not happen". Seeking to understand them as a reaction to the technological and political expansion of capitalist globalization, rather than as a war of religiously based or civilization-based warfare, he described the absolute event and its consequences as follows:

This is not a clash of civilisations or religions, and it reaches far beyond Islam and America, on which efforts are being made to focus the conflict to create the delusion of a visible confrontation and a solution based upon force. There is indeed a fundamental antagonism here, but one that points past the spectre of America (which is perhaps the epicentre, but in no sense the sole embodiment, of globalisation) and the spectre of Islam (which is not the embodiment of terrorism either) to triumphant globalisation battling against itself.

In accordance with his theory of society, Baudrillard portrayed the attacks as a symbolic reaction to the inexorable rise of a world based on commodity exchange.

Baudrillard's stance on the 11 September 2001 attacks was criticised on two counts. Richard Wolin (in The Seduction of Unreason) forcefully accused Baudrillard and Slavoj Žižek of all but celebrating the terrorist attacks, essentially claiming that the United States received what it deserved. Žižek, however, countered that accusation to Wolin's analysis as a form of intellectual barbarism in the journal Critical Inquiry, saying that Wolin failed to see the difference between fantasising about an event and stating that one is deserving of that event. Merrin (in Baudrillard and the Media) argued that Baudrillard's position affords the terrorists a type of moral superiority. In the journal Economy and Society, Merrin further noted that Baudrillard gives the symbolic facets of society unfair privilege above semiotic concerns. Second, authors questioned whether the attacks were unavoidable. Bruno Latour, in Critical Inquiry, argued that Baudrillard believed that their destruction was forced by the society that created them, alluding to the notion that the Towers were "brought down by their own weight." In Latour's view, this was because Baudrillard conceived only of society in terms of a symbolic and semiotic dualism.

=== Debate with Jacques Derrida ===
19 February 2003, with the 2003 invasion of Iraq impending, René Major moderated a debate entitled "Pourquoi La Guerre Aujourd'hui?" between Baudrillard and Jacques Derrida, co-hosted by Major's Institute for Advanced Studies in Psychoanalysis and Le Monde Diplomatique. The debate discussed the relation between terrorist attacks and the invasion. "Where Baudrillard situates 9/11 as the primary motivating force" behind the Iraq War, whereas "Derrida argues that the Iraq War was planned long before 9/11, and that 9/11 plays a secondary role".

=== The Agony of Power ===
During 2005, Baudrillard wrote three short pieces and gave a brief magazine interview, all treating similar ideas; following his death in 2007, the four pieces were collected and published posthumously as The Agony of Power, a polemic against power itself. The first piece, "From Domination to Hegemony", contrasts its two subjects, modes of power; domination stands for historical, traditional power relations, while hegemony stands for modern, more sophisticated power relations as realized by states and businesses. Baudrillard decried the "cynicism" with which contemporary businesses openly state their business models. For example, he cited French television channel TF1 executive Patrick Le Lay who stated that his business' job was "to help Coca-Cola sell its products."

Baudrillard lamented that such honesty pre-empted and thus robbed the Left of its traditional role of critiquing governments and businesses: "In fact, Le Lay takes away the only power we had left. He steals our denunciation." Consequently, Baudrillard stated that "power itself must be abolished—and not solely in the refusal to be dominated [...] but also, just as violently, in the refusal to dominate."

The latter pieces included further analysis of the 11 September terrorist attacks, using the metaphor of the Native American potlatch to describe both American and Muslim societies, specifically the American state versus the hijackers. In the piece's context, "potlatch" referred not to the gift-giving aspect of the ritual, but rather its wealth-destroying aspect: "The terrorists' potlatch against the West is their own death. Our potlatch is indignity, immodesty, obscenity, degradation and abjection." This criticism of the West carried notes of Baudrillard's simulacrum, the above cynicism of business, and contrast between Muslim and Western societies:

We [the West] throw this indifference and abjection at others like a challenge: the challenge to defile themselves in return, to deny their values, to strip naked, confess, admit—to respond to a nihilism equal to our own.

== Reception ==
Jean-François Lyotard's 1974 Économie Libidinale criticised Baudrillard's work.

Sylvère Lotringer notes that Gilles Deleuze, "otherwise known for his generosity", "made it known around Paris" that he saw Baudrillard as "the shame of the profession", in response to Baudrillard's study on Foucault's works.

Sontag, responding to Baudrillard's comments on her reactions to the Bosnian war, described him as "ignorant and cynical" and "a political idiot".

James M. Russell in 2015 wrote that "The most severe" of Baudrillard's "critics accuse him of being a purveyor of a form of reality-denying irrationalism". One of Baudrillard's editors, critical theory professor Mark Poster, remarked:

Baudrillard's writing up to the mid-1980s is open to several criticisms. He fails to define key terms, such as the code; his writing style is hyperbolic and declarative, often lacking sustained, systematic analysis when it is appropriate; he totalizes his insights, refusing to qualify or delimit his claims. He writes about particular experiences, television images, as if nothing else in society mattered, extrapolating a bleak view of the world from that limited base. He ignores contradictory evidence such as the many benefits afforded by the new media

But Poster still argued for his contemporary relevance; he also attempted to refute the most extreme of Baudrillard's critics:

Baudrillard is not disputing the trivial issue that reason remains operative in some actions, that if I want to arrive at the next block, for example, I can assume a Newtonian universe (common sense), plan a course of action (to walk straight for X meters), carry out the action, and finally fulfill my goal by arriving at the point in question. What is in doubt is that this sort of thinking enables a historically informed grasp of the present in general. According to Baudrillard, it does not. The concurrent spread of the hyperreal through the media and the collapse of liberal and Marxist politics as the master narratives deprives the rational subject of its privileged access to truth. In an important sense, individuals are no longer citizens, eager to maximise their civil rights, nor proletarians, anticipating the onset of communism. They are rather consumers, and hence the prey of objects as defined by the code.

Christopher Norris's Uncritical Theory: Postmodernism, Intellectuals and the Gulf War, to Russell, "seeks to reject his media theory and position on "the real" out of hand".

Frankfurt school critical theorist Douglas Kellner's Jean Baudrillard: From Marxism to Postmodernism and Beyond seeks rather to analyse Baudrillard's relation to postmodernism (a concept with which Baudrillard has had a continued, if uneasy and rarely explicit, relationship) and to present a Marxist counter. Regarding the former, William Merrin (discussed above) published more than one denunciation of Norris' position. The latter Baudrillard himself characterised as reductive.

Kellner stated that "it is difficult to decide whether Baudrillard is best read as science fiction and pataphysics, or as philosophy, social theory, and cultural metaphysics, and whether his post-1970s work should be read under the sign of truth or fiction." To Kellner, Baudrillard during and after the 1970s "falls prey to a technological determinism and semiological idealism which posits an autonomous technology".

In 1991, writing for Science Fiction Studies, Vivian Sobchack alleged that "The man [Baudrillard] is really dangerous" for lacking a "moral gaze", while J. G. Ballard (whose novel Baudrillard had written on) commented in his Response to an Invitation to Respond excluded Baudrillard from his criticism towards the journal and its endeavour at large.

Sara Ahmed in 1996 remarked that what Baudrillard's De la séduction was culpable of "celebrating [...] is precisely women's status as signs and commodities circulated by and for male spectators and consumers". Kellner described De la séduction as an "affront to feminism".

Art critic Adrian Searle in 1998 described Baudrillard's photography as "wistful, elegiac and oddly haunting", like "movie stills of unregarded moments".

One of the most commonly cited critiques of Baudrillard was written in 2013 from academic writer Andrew Robinson of Ceasefire magazine, who declares Baudrillard's work as both sexist and racist, while also containing ableist undertones, stating: "Many of his [Baudrillard's] formulations are inadvertently sexist and racist. There are also times when Baudrillard comes across as ableist in his critiques of the therapeutic." Robinson critiques the philosophy of Baudrillard as exaggeratory. Although Robinson provides a critique of Baudrillard's theory, he also describes the value of said theory. Specifically, Robinson states, "Baudrillard’s theory also helps to explain why his appropriation by leftists has been strategically unsuccessful." Robinson also describes the value of the simulacra in relation to media critique, especially in the US media.

=== Tone and attitude ===
Mark Fisher pointed out that Baudrillard "is condemned, sometimes lionised, as the melancholic observer of a departed reality", asserting that Baudrillard "was certainly melancholic". Poster stated that "As the politics of the sixties receded so did Baudrillard's radicalism: from a position of firm leftism he gradually moved to one of bleak fatalism", a view Felix Guattari echoed. Richard G. Smith, David B. Clarke and Marcus A. Doel instead consider Baudrillard "an extreme optimist".

In an exchange between critical theorist McKenzie Wark and EGS professor Geert Lovink, Wark remarked of Baudrillard that "Everything he wrote was marked by a radical sadness and yet invariably expressed in the happiest of forms." Baudrillard himself stated "we have to fight against charges of unreality, lack of responsibility, nihilism, and despair". Chris Turner's English translation of Baudrillard's Cool Memories: 1980–1985 writes, "I accuse myself of[...] being profoundly carnal and melancholy [...] AMEN [sic]".

David Macey saw "extraordinary arrogance" in Baudrillard's take on Foucault. Sontag found Baudrillard 'condescending'.

Russell wrote that "Baudrillard's writing, and his uncompromising – even arrogant – stance, have led to fierce criticism which in contemporary social scholarship can only be compared to the criticism received by Jacques Lacan."

== Influence and legacy ==
Native American Anishinaabe writer Gerald Vizenor made extensive use of Baudrillard's concepts of simulation in his critical work.

American artist Joey Skaggs has been noted for creating media hoaxes that exemplify Baudrillard's concept of hyperreality. By orchestrating fictitious events—such as the Cathouse for Dogs and Portofess—which were reported as real by major news outlets, Skaggs constructs simulations that supplant actual truths, thereby exposing the media's role in manufacturing reality.

=== In popular culture ===
The Wachowskis said that Baudrillard influenced The Matrix (1999), and Neo hides money and disks containing information in Simulacra and Simulation. Adam Gopnik wondered whether Baudrillard, who had not embraced the movie, was "thinking of suing for a screen credit," but Baudrillard himself disclaimed any connection to The Matrix, calling it at best a misreading of his ideas.

Some reviewers have noted that Charlie Kaufman's film Synecdoche, New York seems inspired by Baudrillard's Simulacra and Simulation.

The album Why Hasn't Everything Already Disappeared? by rock band Deerhunter was influenced by Baudrillard's essay of the same name.

=== In technology ===
Cody Wilson, the developer of the first 3D-printed gun, credits the work of Baudrillard as his theoretical inspiration, and claims him as his "master."

== Bibliography ==
=== Books ===
- 1968. The System of Objects (English: 1996)
- 1970. The Consumer Society: Myths and Structures (English: 1998)
- 1972. For a Critique of the Political Economy of the Sign (English: 1981)
- 1973. The Mirror of Production (English: 1975)
- 1976. Symbolic Exchange and Death (English: 1993)
- 1977. Forget Foucault (English: 1987)
- 1978. In the Shadow of the Silent Majorities (English: 1983)
- 1979. Seduction (English: 1990)
- 1981. Simulacra and Simulation (English: 1983)
- 1983. Fatal Strategies (English: 1990)
- 1983. Simulations (first published in English)
- 1985. The Divine Left: A Chronicle of the Years 1977–1984 (English: 1985)
- 1986. America (English: 1988)
- 1987. Cool Memories 1980–1985 (English: 1989)
- 1987. The Ecstasy of Communication (English: 1988)
- 1990. The Transparency of Evil (English: 1993)
- 1990. Cool Memories II 1987–1990 (English: 1996)
- 1991. The Gulf War Did Not Take Place (English: 1995)
- 1992. The Illusion of the End (English: 1994)
- 1995. The Perfect Crime (English: 1996)
- 1995. Fragments: Cool Memories III 1990–1995 (English: 1997)
- 1997. Paroxysm: Interviews with Philippe Petit (English: 1998)
- 1997. Screened Out (English: 2002)
- 1999. Impossible Exchange (English: 2001)
- 2000. Passwords (English: 2003)
- 2000. The Singular Objects of Architecture (English: 2002)
- 2000. The Vital Illusion (first published in English)
- 2000. Cool Memories IV 1995–2000 (English: 2003)
- 2000. The Conspiracy of Art (English: 2005)
- 2001. Fragments (Interviews with François L'Yvonnet) (English: 2003)
- 2001. Telemorphosis (English: 2011)
- 2002. The Spirit of Terrorism and Requiem for the Twin Towers (English: 2002)
- 2004. The Intelligence of Evil or the Lucidity Pact (English: 2005)
- 2005. Cool Memories V 2000–2004 (English: 2006)
- 2005. Exiles from Dialogue (with Enrique Valiente Noailles) (English: 2007)
- 2006. Utopia Deferred: Writings for Utopie (1967–1978) (first published in English)
- 2007. Why Hasn't Everything Already Disappeared? (English: 2009)
- 2008. Radical Alterity (with Marc Guillaume) (first published in English)
- 2008. Carnival and Cannibal, or the Play of Global Antagonisms (English: 2010)
- 2010. The Agony of Power (first published in English)

=== Articles and essays ===
- The Evil Demon of Images. Power Institute of Fine Arts. 1987. pp. 83–98. ISBN 0909952078.
- "Jean Baudrillard - Professor of Philosophy of Culture and Media Criticism - Articles". www.egs.edu. European Graduate School. Archived from the original on 27 May 2010.
- 1996. "No Pity for Sarajevo; The West's Serbianization; When the West Stands In for the Dead." Pp. 79–89 in This Time We Knew: Western Responses to Genocide in Bosnia. NYU Press. JSTOR j.ctt9qfngn.7.
- 2001. "The Spirit of Terrorism." Telos 121(Fall):134–42.
- 2005. "Divine Europe." Telos 131(Summer):188–90.
- 2006. "The Pyres of Autumn." New Left Review 2(37).
- The violence of images, violence against the image.
- Radical Thought (CTheory)
  - CTheory.net
  - Radical Thought

=== Interviews ===
- Jocks, Heinz-Norbert: Die Fotografie und die Dinge. Ein Gespräch mit Jean Baudrillard. In: Kunstforum International., No: 172, Das Ende der Fotografie. Editor: Heinz-Norbert Jocks, 2004, p. 70–83.
- Smith, Richard G., David B. Clarke, eds. 2015. Jean Baudrillard: From Hyperreality to Disappearance: Uncollected Interviews. Edinburgh, UK: Edinburgh University Press. ISBN 978-0-7486-9429-7.
- Smith, Richard G., David B. Clarke, eds. 2017. Jean Baudrillard: The Disappearance of Culture: Uncollected Interviews. Edinburgh, UK: Edinburgh University Press. ISBN 978-1-4744-1778-5.

=== Audio CDs ===
- 1997. Die Illusion des Endes – Das Ende der Illusion [58 minutes + booklet], Jean Baudrillard & Boris Groys. Cologne: supposé. ISBN 3-932513-01-0
- 2006. Die Macht der Verführung, [55 minutes]. Cologne: supposé. ISBN 978-3-932513-67-1.

== See also ==
- Hyper-real Religion – New consumer trend in acquiring and enacting religion
- Reza Negarestani – Iranian philosopher and writer (born 1977)
- The Real – Philosophical category of inexpressible reality
- Code (semiotics) – Conventions used to communicate meaning
- Freud's seduction theory – Abandoned 1890s psychological hypothesis
- Friedrich Nietzsche's views on women
- Symbolic violence – Term coined by the 20th-century French sociologist Pierre Bourdieu
- Psychoanalytic sociology – Application of psychoanalysis to sociology
