= The Singular Objects of Architecture =

Book by Jean Baudrillard

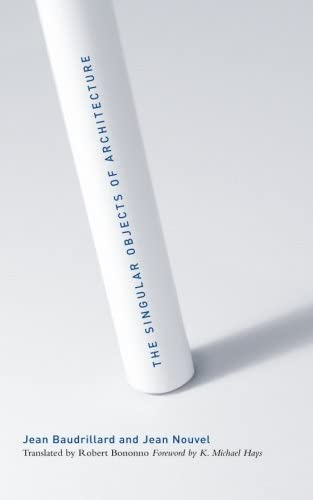
- Author: Jean Baudrillard, Jean Nouvel
- Original title: Architecture et philosophie; Les Objets singuliers
- Translators: Robert Bononno (English)
- Language: French
- Subject: Postmodern philosophy
- Publisher: University of Minnesota Press Minneapolis
- Publication date: 2002
- Publication place: France
- ISBN: 978-0-8166-3913-7

The Singular Objects of Architecture is a book written by French philosopher, Jean Baudrillard. It consists of the two conversations that he had with French architect, Jean Nouvel in 1997 at Maison des Ecrivains and the University of Paris VI-La Villette School of Architecture. In this book, Baudrillard deals with fundamental issues such as politics, Identity, and aesthetics, and explores the possibilities of modern architecture and the future of our modern life.

Among the topics the two speakers take up are the city of tomorrow and the ideal of transparency, the gentrification of New York City and Frank Gehry’s surprising Guggenheim Museum in Bilbao.

The book, developing new philosophical ideas related to architecture, aims to fill the gap between architectural theory and philosophy.

The Singular Objects of Architecture was originally published in French, but since then it has been translated into many languages including English, German, Italian, Spanish, Turkish, and Arabic.

== See also ==
- Desert of the real
- Hyperreality
- Singularity, a concept in systems theory where small changes unpredictably cause large effects
- Semiotics
- Simulated reality
- Simulation hypothesis
- Technological singularity, hypothesised time point when technological change cascades irreversibly, with unforeseeable effects on human society
