= The Gulf War Did Not Take Place =

1991 collected essays by Jean Baudrillard

- Author: Jean Baudrillard
- Original title: La Guerre du Golfe n'a pas eu lieu
- Translator: Paul Patton
- Language: French
- Subject: Gulf War
- Publication date: 1991
- Publication place: France
- English publication date: 1995
- Media type: Print

The Gulf War Did Not Take Place (French: La Guerre du Golfe n'a pas eu lieu) is a collection of three short essays by Jean Baudrillard published in the French newspaper Libération and British paper The Guardian between January and March 1991.

While the author acknowledges that the events and violence of what has been called the Gulf War took place, he asks if the events that took place were really as they were presented, and whether they could be called a war. The title of the first essay is a reference to the play The Trojan War Will Not Take Place by Jean Giraudoux, in which characters attempt to prevent what the audience knows is inevitable.

== Essays ==
- Part 1, "The Gulf War will not take place" (La guerre du Golfe n'aura pas lieu) was published in Libération on January 4, 1991.
- Part 2, "The Gulf War is not really taking place" (La guerre du Golfe a-t-elle vraiment lieu?) was published in Libération on February 6, 1991, and
- Part 3, "The Gulf War did not take place" (La Guerre du Golfe n'a pas eu lieu) was published in Libération on March 29, 1991.

The essays in Libération and The Guardian were published before, during and after the Gulf War and they were titled accordingly: during the American military and rhetorical buildup as "The Gulf War Will Not Take Place"; during military action as "The Gulf War Is Not Taking Place", and after action was over, "The Gulf War Did Not Take Place". A book of elongated versions of the truncated original articles in French was published in May 1991. The English translation was published in early 1995 translated by Paul Patton.

== Summary ==
Baudrillard argued the Gulf War was not really a war, but rather an atrocity which masqueraded as a war. Using overwhelming airpower, the American military for the most part did not directly engage in combat with the Iraqi army, and suffered few casualties. Almost nothing was made known about Iraqi deaths. Thus, the fighting "did not really take place" from the point of view of the West.

All that spectators got to know about the war was in the form of propaganda imagery. The closely watched media presentations made it impossible to distinguish between the experience of what truly happened in the conflict, and its stylized, selective misrepresentation through simulacra.

== Uses of the argument ==
=== 2015 Paris attacks ===
Hamid Dabashi, a professor of Iranian studies and comparative literature at Columbia University, wrote a comment about the November 2015 Paris attacks on Aljazeera.com entitled "The Paris attacks did not take place", in which he criticized how global media outlets like BBC had made up a hyperreal simulacrum of Paris. He believes that after the bombardment of Arabian countries by the West, refugees had flooded into Europe, changing its geography.

While what used to happen in the East was eventually experienced in the West, shattering the imaginary "West–East" dichotomy, the global media outlets focused overwhelmingly on Paris itself, as though it was independent of the rest of the world. He believes that the terrorist attacks did happen, but not in the hyperreal way depicted by the media like BBC.

=== Russo-Ukrainian war ===
Jarryd Bartle, a lecturer of social context, and Kong Degang, a literature and art scholar, cited Baudrillard's argument that "The Gulf War Did Not Take Place" and compared it to the ongoing Russian attack on Ukraine.

Jarryd Bartle published his essay on UnHerd. He said that Baudrillard's opinion, once too postmodern to be accepted, was more relevant than ever in the Russo-Ukrainian war. Amidst the "spectacle" (as in The Society of the Spectacle) of the newsfeeds, people consumed information by piecing them up and fabricating their own virtual perspectives. Some even started imagining an outbreak of "World War III". He pointed out that while many commentators criticized the spread of misinformation, most lost sight of the harm of information overload and virtualisation.

Kong Degang, a Chinese scholar, compared the defense of Sihang Warehouse as featured in the Chinese film The Eight Hundred, the Gulf War as written about by Baudrillard, to the ongoing Russo-Ukrainian war. He analyzed that in The Eight Hundred, the battle against the Japanese invaders was depicted as a "performance" intended to be watched by Shanghai citizens and the international community. From the audience's perspective, the Japanese invaders won the battle but lost the war in the "performance" due to their unrighteousness. Yet this was not the exact historical truth since no one witnessing it could predict the war's outcome merely by a battle.

The Russo-Ukrainian war unfolded quite differently from both the defense of Sihang Warehouse and the Gulf War. The latest media technologies generate real-time simulacra dwarfing those of the Gulf War in realism and virtuality, leading to information overload. Unable to (in)validate the war updates, many dismiss the war's reality—as if it "did not take place"—yet eagerly fight in a "cyber simulacra war" that is "constantly taking place". Both sides perform their "justness" and declare their victories. Meanwhile, the real casualties—civilians in Ukraine and Russia, and even the forgotten warzones like Syria, Palestine, Yemen, Somalia, and Afghanistan—remain overlooked by the international community.

== See also ==
- Hyperreality
- Media event
- Simulacra and Simulation
