= In the Shadow of the Silent Majorities =

1978 philosophical treatise by Jean Baudrillard

In the Shadow of the Silent Majorities, Or, the End of the Social
- First edition (French)
- Author: Jean Baudrillard
- Original title: À l’ombre des majorités silencieuses ou la fin du social
- Translator: Paul Foss, John Johnston, Paul Patton
- Language: French
- Subject: Philosophy of social science, Criticism of sociology
- Publisher: Les Cahiers d'Utopie (French) & Semiotext(e) (English)
- Publication date: 1978
- Publication place: France
- English publication date: 1983
- Media type: Print (Paperback)
- Pages: 123 pp
- ISBN: 0936756004
- Dewey Decimal: 302.23
- LC Class: HM866 .B38132 1983
- Preceded by: L'Effet Beaubourg (1977)
- Followed by: L'Ange de stuc (1978)

In the Shadow of the Silent Majorities, Or, the End of the Social (French: À l’ombre des majorités silencieuses ou la fin du social) is a 1978 philosophical treatise by Jean Baudrillard, in which he analyzes the mass society and their relation to meaning. Baudrillard praises the masses for their resistance to the mass media, and lauded 'the social', for their "direct defiance of the political" "victoriously resist[ing] the media by diverting or absorbing all the messages which it produces without responding to them".

== Publication history ==
The first edition of the book was published in the final issue of the magazine Les Cahiers d'Utopie in 1978. It was translated to English by Paul Foss, John Johnston and Paul Patton, and published by the Foreign Agents imprint of Semiotext(e) in 1983. A second edition was published in 2007.

== Main ideas ==
In the 1970s, magazines such as Utopie, Noir et rouge, ICO, Socialisme ou Barbarie, Pouvoir ouvrier, and the Situationists were unconditionally opposed the "official culture". They saw the masses as hypnotized into submission by a "society of the spectacle."

Baudrillard's interpretation stated that meaning became devalued.

He argues that the masses actively refuse meaning, breaking with sociology.

== See also ==
- Spectacle (critical theory)
- Silent majority
