= The Mirror of Production =

1973 book by Jean Baudrillard

- Cover of the first edition
- Author: Jean Baudrillard
- Original title: Le Miroir de la production
- Language: French
- Subject: Marxism
- Publication date: 1973
- Publication place: France
- Media type: Print

The Mirror of Production (French: Le Miroir de la production) is a 1973 book by French sociologist and philosopher Jean Baudrillard. It is a systematic critique of Marxism. Baudrillard's thesis is that Karl Marx's theory of historical materialism is too rooted in assumptions and values of political economy which Marx attempted to critique to provide a sufficient framework for radical action. According to Baudrillard, the fault of Marxism is in prioritizing the very concepts that undergird capital, for example, necessity, value, and labor. He furthermore argues that the Marxist view fails to take into account the role of signs and symbols in the production process, as well as the increasing importance of consumer culture. The book is a semiotic critique of the political economy of the sign.

Baudrillard states that Marx's critique of political economy was based on forms of production and labour. Marx did not transcend political economy but merely saw its reverse or its "mirror" side. Marxism merely strengthens political economy's basic propositions, in particular, the idea that self-creation is performed through productive, non-alienated labour. In Baudrillard's words: "[Marxism] convinces men that they are alienated by the sale of their labor power, thus censoring the much more radical hypothesis that they might be alienated as labor power." Baudrillard proposes to liberate workers from their "labour value" and think in terms other than production.

Baudrillard argues that the mirror of production ultimately leads to the end of production itself. He contends that the constant reproduction of the means of production leads to a situation where production becomes redundant and that this redundancy is reflected in the increasing importance of consumption and the virtualization of the economy.

== See also ==
- Critique of political economy
- Moishe Postone
- Robert Kurz
- Mirror stage
