= Richard G. Smith (geographer) =

British geographer

Richard G. Smith is a British geographer. His research focuses on the philosophy of Jean Baudrillard, and urban studies, especially on poststructuralist cities.

== Academic career ==
Smith was educated at the University of Hull (BA Hons Geography, 1st class, 1992) and University of Bristol (PhD, 1995 - supervised by Sir Nigel Thrift). Currently he works at Swansea University in the United Kingdom.

== Research ==
Smith speaks about cities around the world, recently in Kazan in Russia, and in Bogotá and Medellín in Colombia. He was interviewed about global cities for Colombian TV. His current research focuses on poststructuralism, assemblage theory, and actor-network theory in urban studies.

He is the author of numerous articles on Baudrillard's oeuvre. Editor of The Baudrillard Dictionary (Edinburgh University Press, 2010), Jean Baudrillard: Fatal Theories (Routledge, 2009), 'Baudrillard Redux' (Special Issue of Cultural Politics, 2011), Jean Baudrillard: from Hyperreality to Disappearance: Uncollected Interviews (EUP, 2015). He is an editorial board member of the International Journal of Baudrillard Studies. He organized the first major UK conference on Baudrillard's work in 2006 (4-6 September), and was interviewed in 2014 about Baudrillard for a South Korean TV documentary.

== Publications ==
- Beaverstock JV, Smith RG & Taylor PJ (1999) "A roster of world cities", Cities: The International Journal of Urban Policy and Planning, 16 (6), 445-458
- Beaverstock JV, Smith RG & Taylor PJ (2000) "World city network: a new metageography?", millennial issue of the Annals of the Association of American Geographers, 90, March, 123-134
- Smith RG (2003) "World city actor-networks", Progress in Human Geography, 27 (1), 25-44
- Smith RG (2003) "World city topologies", Progress in Human Geography, 27 (5), 561-582
- Smith RG (2009) “Structuralism / Structuralist Geography”, in The International Encyclopedia of Human Geography edited by Rob Kitchin & Nigel Thrift, volume 11, (Elsevier, Oxford), pp. 30–38
- Clarke D B, Doel M A, Merrin W, and Smith R G eds. (2009) Jean Baudrillard: Fatal Theories (Routledge, London). ISBN 978-0-415-46442-0
- Smith RG ed. (2010) The Baudrillard Dictionary (Edinburgh University Press, Edinburgh). ISBN 978-0-7486-3921-2
- Smith RG (2010) “Urban studies without ‘scale’: localizing the global through Singapore”, in Urban Assemblages: How Actor-Network Theory Changes Urban Studies edited by Ignacio Farias and Thomas Bender (Routledge, London), pp. 73–90
- Smith RG and Doel MA (2011) “Questioning the Theoretical Basis of Current Global-City Research: Structures, Networks and Actor-Networks”, International Journal of Urban and Regional Research 35 (1), 24–39
- Smith RG (2011) “NY-LON”, in International Handbook of Globalization and World Cities edited by Derudder B, Hoyler M, Taylor PJ & Witlox F (Edward Elgar), pp. 720–32
- Smith RG (2011) "'Poststructuralism' (pp. 190-2), 'Post-Marxism' (pp. 181-83), and 'Postmodern/Postmodernity' (pp. 184-86)", in Sim S ed. The Lyotard Dictionary, Edinburgh University Press, Edinburgh
- Smith RG, Clarke DB and Doel MA eds. (2011) “Special Issue: Baudrillard Redux”, Special Issue of Cultural Politics, Vol 7, Issue 3, November, pp. 325–476
- Smith RG (2013) “City” (pp. 50–53), “City of Panic” (pp. 53–54), “Third Interval” (pp. 196–197), “Escape Velocity” (pp. 79–80), in Armitage J ed. The Virilio Dictionary (Edinburgh University Press)
- Smith RG (2013) “The ordinary city trap snaps back”, Environment and Planning A, 45 (10), October, 2318–2322
- Smith RG (2013) “The ordinary city trap”, Environment and Planning A, 45 (10), October, 2290–2304
- Smith RG (2013) “Baudrillard, Jean”, in McGee RJ & Warms RL eds. Encyclopedia of Theory in Social and Cultural Anthropology (Sage, London), 62–64
- Smith RG (2014) 'Dubai in extremis', Theory Culture & Society: http://tcs.sagepub.com/content/31/7-8/291.abstract
- Smith RG (2014) “Beyond the global-city concept and the myth of ‘command and control’”, International Journal of Urban and Regional Research, 38 (1), January, 98–115 (published first on-line June 19, 2013 [doi: 10.1111/1468-2427.12024])
- Smith RG (2015) 'Satellites and Cities from Space', Theory, Culture & Society: http://theoryculturesociety.org/richard-g-smith-on-satellites-and-cities-from-space/
- Smith RG & Clarke D eds. (2015) Jean Baudrillard: from Hyperreality to Disappearance: Uncollected Interviews (Edinburgh University Press)
