= Symbolic Exchange and Death =

1976 book by Jean Baudrillard

- 1994 edition
- Author: Jean Baudrillard
- Subject: Social psychology, value, death, symbolism
- Publication date: January 1, 1976
- Publication place: France

Symbolic Exchange and Death is a 1976 book by the sociologist Jean Baudrillard. The book primarily critiques the concept of value, and its economic relations with death. It is regarded as a classic in the field of postmodernism.
