= The System of Objects =

1968 Book by Jean Baudrillard

System of Objects
- Author: Jean Baudrillard
- Original title: Le Système des objets
- Language: French
- Subject: Consumerism
- Publication date: 1968
- Publication place: France
- Media type: Print

The System of Objects (French: Le Système des objets) is a 1968 book by sociologist Jean Baudrillard. The book is based on the Baudrillard's 1966 doctoral thesis under the dissertation committee of Henri Lefebvre, Roland Barthes, and Pierre Bourdieu.

== Content ==
In his early books, such as The System of Objects, For a Critique of the Political Economy of the Sign, and The Consumer Society, Baudrillard's main focus is upon consumerism, and how different objects are consumed in different ways. At this time Baudrillard's political outlook was loosely associated with Marxism (and situationism), but in these books he differed from Karl Marx in one significant way. For Baudrillard, as for the situationists, it was consumption rather than production that was the main driver of capitalist society.
