= Sign value =

Philosophical concept

In sociology and in economics, the term sign value denotes and describes the value accorded to an object because of the prestige (social status) that it imparts upon the possessor, rather than the material value and utility derived from the function and the primary use of the object. For example, the buyer of a Rolls-Royce limousine might partly value the automobile as transport, yet might also value it as a sign that signifies his or her wealth to a particular community and to society in general. The automobile's transport-function is primary, from which arises its use-value, whilst the social prestige function is secondary, from which arises its sign-value.

The French sociologist Jean Baudrillard proposed the theory of sign value as a philosophic and economic counterpart to the dichotomy of exchange-value vs. use-value, which Karl Marx recognized as a characteristic of capitalism as an economic system.
