= Exchange value =

Proportion of worth at which a commodity can be traded for other commodities

In political economy and especially Marxian economics, exchange value (German: Tauschwert) refers to one of the four major attributes of a commodity, i.e., an item or service produced for, and sold on the market, the other three attributes being use value, economic value, and price. Thus, a commodity has the following:

- a value, represented by the socially necessary labour time to produce it (Note: the first link is to a non-Marxian definition of value);
- a use value (or utility);
- an exchange value, which is the proportion at which a commodity can be exchanged for other entities;
- a price (an actual selling price, or an imputed ideal price).

These four concepts have a very long history in human thought, from Aristotle to David Ricardo, and became more clearly distinguished as the development of commercial trade progressed but have largely disappeared as four distinct concepts in modern economics.

This entry focuses on Karl Marx's summation of the results of economic thought about exchange value.

== Exchange value and price according to Marx ==
Marx regards exchange-value as the proportion in which one commodity is exchanged for other commodities. For Marx, exchange-value is not identical to the money price of a commodity. Actual money prices (or even equilibrium prices) will only ever roughly correspond to exchange-values. The relationship between exchange-value and price is analogous to the relationship between the exact measured temperature of a room and the everyday awareness of that temperature from feeling alone. Thus, Marx did not consider the divergence between exchange-value and market outcomes as a refutation of his theoretical framework. Certain contemporary Marxian scholars have underscored this perspective, often citing the pronounced discrepancies between exchange-value and actual monetary prices in fixed assets, such as housing, as evidence of the existence and dynamics of fictitious capital.

The value of a good is determined by the socially necessary labour time required to produce it.

Marx believed that an understanding of exchange-value was necessary to explain fluctuations in price.

Exchange-value does not need to be expressed in money-prices necessarily (for example, such as in countertrade: x amount of goods p are worth y amounts of goods q). Marx makes this abundantly clear in his dialectical derivation of the forms of value in the first chapters of Das Kapital (see value-form).

It was only in the 13th century AD when the word price came into use in Western Europe, its Latin root being pretium, meaning "reward, prize, value, worth", referring back to the notion of "recompense", or what was given in return, the expense, wager or cost incurred when a good changed hands. Its verb meaning "to set the price of" was used only from the 14th century onwards.

Its evolving linguistic meanings reflect the early history of the growing cash economy and the evolution of commercial trade. Nowadays the meaning of price is obvious and self-evident, and it is assumed that prices are all one of a kind. This is with respect to how money has become used ubiquitously for nearly all transactions.

But in fact there are many different kinds of prices, some of which are actually charged, and some of which are only "notional prices". Although a particular price may not refer to any real transaction, it can nevertheless influence economic behavior, as people have become accustomed to valuing and calculating exchange-value in terms of prices, using money (see real prices and ideal prices).

== Commodification ==
In the first chapters of Das Kapital, Marx traces out a brief logical summary of the development of the forms of trade, beginning with barter and simple exchange, and ending with a capitalistically produced commodity. This sketch of the process of "marketisation" shows that the commodity form is not fixed once and for all, but in fact undergoes a development as trade becomes more sophisticated, with the end result being that a commodity's exchange-value can be expressed simply in a (notional) quantity of money (a money price).

However, the transformation of a labor-product into a commodity (its "marketing") is in reality not a simple process, but has many technical and social preconditions. These often include:

- the existence of a reliable supply of a product, or at least a surplus or surplus product;
- the existence of a social need for it (a market demand) that must be met through trade, or at any event cannot be met otherwise;
- the legally sanctioned assertion of private ownership rights to the commodity and the right to trade it;
- the enforcement of these rights, so that ownership is secure;
- the transferability of these private rights from one owner to another;
- the (physical) transferability of the commodity itself, i.e., the ability to store, package, preserve and transport it from one owner to another;
- the imposition of exclusivity of access to the commodity;
- the possibility of the owner to use or consume the commodity privately;
- guarantees about the quality and safety of the commodity, and possibly a guarantee of replacement or service, should it fail to function as intended;
- the ability to produce the commodity at a cost and sale-price sufficient to yield an adequate and predictable income or profit;
- the ability to produce and trade a commodity without too much risk of a type that would undermine the business.

Thus, the commodification of a good or service often involves a considerable practical accomplishment in trade. It is a process that may be influenced not just by economic or technical factors, but also political and cultural factors, insofar as it involves property rights, claims to access to resources, and guarantees about quality or safety of use.

"To trade or not to trade", that may be the question. The modern debate in this regard focuses often on intellectual property rights because ideas are increasingly becoming objects of trade, and the technology now exists to transform ideas into commodities much more easily.

In absolute terms, exchange values can also be measured as quantities of average labour-hours. By contrast, prices are normally measured in money-units. For practical purposes, prices are however usually preferable to labour-hours, as units of account, although in capitalist work processes the two are related to each other (see labor power).

== Marx's quote on commodities and their exchange ==
Marx's view of commodities in Capital is illustrated by the following quote:

We have seen that when commodities are in the relation of exchange, their exchange-value manifests itself as something totally independent of their use-value. But if we abstract from their use-value, there remains their value, as has just been defined. The common factor in the exchange relation, or in the exchange-value of the commodity, is therefore its value. (Vintage/Penguin edition, p. 128, chapter 1, §1, para. 12)

This first part says that the value of commodities as they are exchanged for each other—or when stated in terms of money units, their prices—are very different from their value in use to human beings, their use-value.

Next, Marx describes how he had abstracted from the differences in use-value and thus from the concrete differences amongst commodities, looking for their shared characteristics. He famously claimed to find that what's left is that all commodities have value (or "labor-value"), the abstract labor time needed to produce it. That is, all commodities are social products of labor, created and exchanged by a community, with each commodity producer contributing his or her time to the societal division of labor. Each commodity is a social product by nature.

Third, value is not the same thing as exchange-value (or price). Rather, the value is the shared characteristic of the exchange-values of all the commodities. He calls this the "common factor", whereas someone else might call it the "essence". In contrast, the exchange-value represents the appearance or "form" of expression of value in trade. Just as with used cars, the shiny appearance may differ radically from the lemony essence. In fact, one of his major themes (the theory of "commodity fetishism") is that the system of commodity exchange that dominates capitalism obscures the class nature of that institution.

To Marx, the "exchange value" of a commodity also represents its owner's purchasing power, the ability to command labor, i.e., the amount of labor time that is claimed in acquiring it. This aspect appears not only in the modern services economy, but in the market for tangible goods: by purchasing a good, one is gaining the results of the labor done to produce it, while one is also commanding (directing) labor to produce more of it.

== Transformation of values into prices ==
In volumes I and II of Capital, Marx usually assumed that exchange values were equal to values, and that prices were proportional to values. He was talking about overall movements and broad averages, and his interest was in the social relations of production existing behind economic exchange. However, he was quite conscious of the distinction between the empirical and microeconomic concept of prices (or exchange values) and the social concept of value. In fact he completed the draft of volume 3 of Das Kapital before he published volume 1.

Despite this, the fruitless search for a quantitative relationship allowing the logical derivation of prices from values (a labor theory of price) with the aid of mathematical functions has occupied many economists, producing the famous transformation problem literature.

If, however, prices can fluctuate above or below value for all sorts of reasons, Marx's law of value is best seen as a "law of grand averages", an overall generalisation about economic exchange, and the quantitative relationships between labour hours worked and real prices charged for an output are best expressed in probabilistic terms.

One might ask, how can "value" be transformed into "price" if a commodity by definition already has a value and a price? To understand this, one needs to recognise the process whereby products move into markets and are withdrawn from markets. Outside the market, not being offered for sale or being sold, commodities have at best a potential or hypothetical price. But for Marx prices are formed according to pre-existing product-values which are socially established prior to their exchange.

Marx sought to theorise the transformation of commodity values into prices of production within capitalism dialectically, as a "moving contradiction": namely, in capitalism, the value of a commodity output produced encompassed both the equivalent of the cost of the used inputs which were initially bought to produce it, as well as a gross profit component (surplus value) which became definite and manifest only after the commodity has been sold and paid for, and after costs were deducted from sales. Value was, as it were, suspended between the past and the future.

An output with a certain value was produced, but exactly how much of that value would be subsequently realised upon sale in markets was usually not known in advance. Yet, that potential value also strongly affected the sales income that producers could get from it, and moreover that value was determined not by individual enterprises, but by all enterprises producing the same type of output for a given market demand ("the state of the market"). The business results of each enterprise were influenced by the overall effects created by all enterprises through their productive activity, as an ongoing process.

This simple "market reality" has stumped many of Marx's interpreters though; they fail to see that value is conserved, transferred and added to by living labor, between the initial purchase of inputs with money on the one side, and the subsequent sale of outputs for more money, on the other. They see only input prices and output prices, or cost-prices and sale-prices, and not the creation of a product which already has a value prior to being exchanged at a certain price - a value which is moreover socially determined by a group of enterprises together, and which sets limits for price fluctuations.

For that reason, the whole process of the formation of value which Marx so carefully lays out, with its complex determinants, seems like an unnecessary detour from commercial wisdom. If, however, we wish to understand the "deep structure" of market behavior, then we rapidly confront all the issues that Marx was concerned with.

== Relation to mainstream economics ==
In modern neoclassical economics, exchange value itself is no longer explicitly theorised. The reason is that the concept of money-price is deemed sufficient in order to understand trading processes and markets. Exchange value thus becomes simply the price for which a good will trade in a given market which is identical to what Marx refers to as price. These trading processes are no longer understood in economics as social processes involving human giving and taking, getting and receiving, but as technical processes in which rational, self-interested economic actors negotiate prices based on subjective perceptions of utility. Market realities are therefore understood in terms of supply and demand curves which sets price at a level where supply equals demand. Professor John Eatwell criticizes this approach as follows:

Since the markets are driven by average opinion about what average opinion will be, an enormous premium is placed on any information or signals that might provide a guide to the swings in average opinion and as to how average opinion will react to changing events. These signals have to be simple and clear-cut. Sophisticated interpretations of the economic data would not provide a clear lead. So the money markets and foreign exchange markets become dominated by simple slogans—larger fiscal deficits lead to higher interest rates, an increased money supply results in higher inflation, public expenditure bad, private expenditure good—even when those slogans are persistently refuted by events. To these simplistic rules of the game there is added a demand for governments to publish their own financial targets, to show that their policy is couched within a firm financial framework. The main purpose of insisting on this government commitment to financial targeting is to aid average opinion in guessing how average opinion will expect the government to respond to changing economic circumstances and how average opinion will react when the government fails to meet its goals. So "the markets" are basically a collection of overexcited young men and women, desperate to make money by guessing what everyone else in the market will do. Many have no more claim to economic rationality than tipsters at the local racetrack and probably rather less specialist knowledge.

== See also ==
- Labor theory of value
- Law of value
- Natural economy
- Paradox of value
- Prices of production
- Real prices and ideal prices
- Unequal exchange
- Use value
- Value in economics
- Value-form
- Sign value
