= Real and ideal prices =

Ideal level of money

The distinction between real prices and ideal prices is a distinction between actual prices paid for products, services, assets and labour (the net amount of money that actually changes hands), and computed prices which are not actually charged or paid in market trade, although they may facilitate trade. The difference is between actual prices paid, and information about possible, potential or likely prices, or "average" price levels.

This distinction should not be confused with the difference between "nominal prices" (current-value) and "real prices" (adjusted for price inflation, and/or tax and/or ancillary charges). It is more similar to, though not identical with, the distinction between "theoretical value" and "market price" in financial economics.

In commercial business, an “ideal price” may be thought of as an “optimal” price, at which buyers are queueing up to buy a good and are satisfied with their purchase, while sellers obtain the best possible profit or income for the longest possible time. In the real world, this happy situation may be difficult to reach completely, but a “target price-level” shows at least what to aim for. Such a price is, however, only one sort of ideal price; all kinds of hypothetical or assumed prices can be used in all kinds of price calculations, to understand the effects of different assumptions in the given business situation.

== Characteristics ==
Ideal prices, expressed in money-units, can be "estimated", "theorized" or "imputed" for accounting, trading, marketing or calculation purposes, for example using the law of averages. Often the actual prices of real transactions are combined with assumed prices, for the purpose of a price calculation or estimate. Even if such prices therefore may not directly correspond to transactions involving actually traded products, assets or services, they can nevertheless provide "price signals" which influence economic behavior.

For example, if statisticians publish aggregated price estimates about the economy as a whole, market actors are likely to respond to this price information, even if it is far from exact, if it is based on a very large number of assumptions, and if it is later revised. The release of new GDP data, for instance, often has an immediate effect on stock market activity, insofar as it is interpreted as an indicator of whether and how fast the market – and consequently the incomes generated by it – is growing or declining.

Ideal prices are typically prices that would apply in trade, if certain assumed conditions apply (and they may not). The number of ideal prices used for calculations or signalling in the world vastly exceeds the number of real prices fetched. At any point in time, most economic goods and services in society are being owned, stored or used, but not traded; nevertheless people are constantly extrapolating prices which would apply if they were traded in markets or if they had to be replaced. Such price information is essential to estimate the possible incomes, budgetary implications or costs associated with a transaction.

The distinction is currently best known in the professions of auditing, econometrics and banking, which calculate and apply many different kinds of prices, to value labour, products and assets. The distinction has enormous significance for economic theory, and for econometric measurement and price theory; the main reason is that price data is very often the basis for government and business decisions which have a very large impact.

== Differences between real and ideal prices ==
A distinction between real (or actual) prices and ideal prices, was introduced in Karl Marx's Grundrisse notebooks. In A Contribution to the Critique of Political Economy (1859), Marx already criticizes James Steuart and John Gray because they fudged the distinction between actual prices and ideal prices. In chapter 3 of the first volume of Das Kapital, Marx states:

"Every trader knows, that he is far from having turned his goods into money, when he has expressed their value in a price or in imaginary money, and that it does not require the least bit of real gold, to estimate in that metal millions of pounds' worth of goods. When, therefore, money serves as a measure of value, it is employed only as imaginary or ideal money. This circumstance has given rise to the wildest theories. But, although the money that performs the functions of a measure of value is only ideal money, price depends entirely upon the actual substance that is money. (...) The possibility... of quantitative incongruity between price and magnitude of value, or the deviation of the former from the latter, is inherent in the price-form itself. This is no defect, but, on the contrary, admirably adapts the price-form to a mode of production whose inherent laws impose themselves only as the mean of apparently lawless irregularities that compensate one another. The price-form, however, is not only compatible with the possibility of a quantitative incongruity between magnitude of value and price, i.e., between the former and its expression in money, but it may also conceal a qualitative inconsistency, so much so, that, although money is nothing but the value-form of commodities, price ceases altogether to express value."

The activity of pricing goods, services and assets, facilitating transactions, communicating prices and keeping track of them in fact consumes a very large amount of human labour-time, irrespective of whether it happens to occur in a centralized or decentralized way. Millions of workers are professionally specialized in such activities, whether as clerks, tellers, buyers, retail assistants, accountants, financial advisors, bank workers, or economists etc. If that work is not done, price information would not be available, with the result that the trading process would become difficult or impossible to operate. Whether or not this is considered "bureaucratic", it therefore remains an essential administrative service. People cannot "choose between prices" if they don't even know what those prices are; and, normally, they cannot just "make up" any kind of price they like, because costing, budgets and incomes depend precisely on what price is charged.

The creation of price information is a production process – its output is worth money, because it is vital for the purpose of trade, and without it the circulation of goods and services could not occur. Price information can therefore be bought and sold as a commodity as well. But the production process of prices themselves is often hidden from view and hardly noticeable. Therefore, people often take the existence of price information for granted and as obvious, meriting no further inquiry. "A mysterious certainty dominates our lives in late capitalist modernity: the price. Not a single day passes without learning, making, and taking it. Yet despite prices' widespread presence around us, we do not know much about them." A price may also be attached in the course of another activity, or the pricing procedure may be a closely guarded secret rather than accessible in an open market because if competitors knew about it, this could adversely affect business income. But if pricing processes are viewed as production processes, it turns out that much more is involved than the observation of a price-tag or number might suggest.

For most of the history of economics, economic theorists were not primarily concerned with explaining the actual, real price-levels. Instead their theorizing was concerned with theoretical (ideal) prices. Simon Clarke explains for example:

"The marginalists were no more concerned with the determination of the actual prices that ruled on the market than were the classical economists. All the innovators emphasised the abstract character of pure economic theory, in which the intervention of chance and uncertainty, of specific historical institutions or political interventions, could all be ignored and their consideration deferred to subordinate empirical and policy studies. Pure theory was not concerned with the determination of actual prices but with their determination in an ideal world of perfect knowledge, perfect foresight, perfect competition and pure rationality. It is against this ideal world that the real world, and proposed reforms in the real world, are to be measured. The questions that gave rise to a demand for a pure theory of price were questions about the proper prices of commodities. Jevons, for example, was especially concerned with the problem of scarcity (in particular the scarcity of coal) and with the role of prices in allocating resources. The problem he posed was that of determining what prices would achieve the optimal allocation of resources. The solutions that were reached would then serve as the basis of policy prescriptions about the proper role of state intervention in the formation of prices in order to achieve such an allocation."

It is only relatively recently that economists tried to create generalizations about the actual pricing procedures used by business enterprises, based on information about what business people actually do (instead of an abstract mathematical model).

== Illustrations of ideal prices ==
- An example would be an equilibrium price calculated by an economist. This is a price which a type of product or asset would theoretically have, if supply and demand were balanced. This price does not exist in actual trading processes except in special and rare cases; it is only an ideal or theoretical price level, which at best is only approximated in the real world.
- In accounting practice, ideal prices are used all the time. For example, when accountants have to value a stock of assets, or a set of transactions across an interval of time (for tax, commercial or audit purposes), they apply rules and criteria to arrive at a price reflecting the cost or market-value of the stock or flow of transactions. In grossing and netting, they apply certain rules of inclusion and exclusion to obtain the desired measure. But the valuation obtained following a standard procedure is in truth only hypothetical, because it represents a price which the assets or flows would have if they were traded or exchanged under assumed (stylized or standardized) conditions, or if they were replaced at a certain point in time. In principle, they need not refer to any real transaction flows at all, being only an imputation. Yet, the ideal price obtained may nevertheless influence very many transactions based on it, to the extent that it provides information and a measure of how a related market process is thought to be evolving.
- Ideal prices are often used in price negotiations, bidding, price estimation and insurance. These are calculated prices for things being traded, or the compensation which would be given, if certain conditions apply. Business deals can become very complex, and may involve numerous price assumptions. For example, the contract may be that if an average price trend occurs, then a certain amount of money will be paid out. Thus, the actual amount of money that changes hands may be conditional on a variety of price estimates.

== Actual and potential prices ==
When goods are produced for sale, they may be priced, but those prices are initially only potential prices. There may not be any certainty about whether they will all fetch exactly the sum of money stated by those prices when they are actually sold, or whether they will be sold at all. In retrospect, the final value of an output, activity or asset may turn out to have been higher or lower than previously anticipated, because for various reasons prices and demand changed in the meantime. Thus, price negotiations, trading circumstances and the time factor may change actual prices realized from the prices originally set, and if price inflation occurs there is in addition a difference between the nominal prices and the inflation-adjusted price. The price of a stock or a debt security, expressed in a given currency, may be highly variable, and their variable yields may in turn revalue or devalue the prices of related assets.

Thus, the "price mechanism" is often not simply a function of supply and demand for a tradable object, but of a structure of related and co-existing prices, where fluctuations in one group of prices impact on another group of prices, perhaps quite contrary to the wishes of buyers and sellers. In this sense, the concept of a "price shock" refers to a drastic change in the price of a good which is widely used, and which therefore suddenly changes many related prices.

The sale price may be modified also by the difference in time between purchase and payment. For example, someone may opt to buy a product on credit, and pay interest in addition to the asking price for the product. The interest charge may vary during the interval in which the principal is paid off. Or, the price may change because of price inflation or because it is renegotiated. If it is not possible to pay for something within the previously expected time interval, that may also change prices.

Mike Beggs explains why credit instruments complicate the distinction between actual and ideal prices:

...the essence of monetary relations is that exchange often is, and has been, mediated by credit relations rather than through the actual circulation of money. This is undeniably true: credit relationships transform exchange so that payments do not coincide with transactions and reciprocal relationships may mean that some debts balance without ever needing to be cleared by monetary payment.

The effect of credit instruments is, that actual payments are removed in space and time from the trade in debt obligations, and indeed the trade in debt can occur without necessarily involving any transactions with real money. In turn, this blurs the distinction between actual money (i.e. hard cash) and ideal money, or between real and ideal prices. In developed economies, cash in circulation normally ranges from 6% to 8% of GDP, but the debts of private banks alone are already a multiple of GDP (in the EU area, about 3.5x the total GDP).

== Valuation criteria in pricing ==
Consequently, what the "real" price of a thing is, might be a topic of dispute, because it may involve conditions and valuation criteria which some would not accept, because they apply different valuation criteria, different conditions or have a different purpose. For example, an asset or product may be valued by accountants and statisticians at:

- its historic cost
- its face value
- its book value
- its accounting value
- its market value (current average, past average, or at a specific calendar date)
- its present value
- its future value
- its nominal value
- its accrual value
- its promotional value
- its value for legal purposes
- its gross or net value
- its replacement value
- its trading value
- its FOB value
- its value before and after transport costs
- its transfer pricing value
- its insurance value
- its pre-tax, taxable or post-tax value
- its depreciated value
- its inflation-adjusted value
- its value in a foreign currency
- its value at purchasing power parity
- its final (sold) value (including all costs, charges, taxes and fees)

A price for an asset, a product or a service can be computed for each of these valuations, depending on the purpose. Often the purpose is assumed to be self-evident, being related to a specific transaction, and so the price of something is taken as obvious. But to understand the calculated price, it may be necessary to know the assumptions on which it is based. Without that knowledge, the meaning of a price may not be transparent.

== Price abstraction ==
The price resulting from a calculation may be regarded as symbolizing (representing) one transaction, or many transactions at once, but the validity of this "price abstraction" all depends on whether the computational procedure and valuation method are accepted. The use of ideal prices for the purpose of accounting, estimation and theorising has become so habitual and ingrained in modern society, that they are frequently confused with the real prices actually realised in trade. Prices may be viewed only as a kind of data, information, or a type of knowledge, or the information available about a money quantity may be equated with the "real thing" (in the Austrian school of economics, prices are often regarded as data and as information, or as representing information, although admittedly market actors do not necessarily know all the information which is distilled, summarized and represented in the price numbers). Unfortunately, politicians may not always speak truthfully about trade.

The concept of price is often used in a very loose sense to refer to all kinds of transactional possibilities. That can lead to theoretical errors. The notion of "the price of something" is often applied to sums of money denoting various quite different financial categories (e.g. a purchase or sale cost, the amount of a liability, the amount of a compensation, an asset value, an asset yield, an interest rate etc.).

For example, an interest rate can be defined as the "price" of borrowing money for a period of time. Here, the concept of price is used in the loose sense of "a cost" or "a compensation." This loose sense means that the distinction between actual prices and ideal prices is lost. In turn, that means that the concept of price then stands for any kind of commercial valuation we care to make. Any activity, thing or transaction has its "price-tag", so to speak. It can be difficult to work out, even for an economist, what a price really means, and price information can be deceptive.

A price is not necessarily transparent, just because it is a market price. This was already known in ancient civilizations. A Latin expression from Roman times is caveat emptor which means "let the buyer beware" (for example, when buying a used vehicle). In contract law, a "caveat emptor" clause is a disclaimer which stipulates that sellers cannot be held responsible for what buyers do not know about their purchase, i.e. it is accepted that there exists information asymmetry to some or other degree (the purchase may - or may not - include a warranty or legal guarantee which, under specified conditions, gives the buyer his money back). Another Roman expression is Cui Bono which means "who profits or benefits from it?" - that is, one needs to examine the intended purchase carefully, and identify/weigh what buyers and sellers stand to gain from the deal (what their own interest is).

Ideal prices are typically prices that would apply in trade, if certain assumed conditions apply (and they may not). Ideal prices are typically not observable, but instead inferences from observables. Transactions are registered in accounts, the accounting information is aggregated up to compute price data, and this data is in turn used to estimate price trends. In the process of so doing, there is a transition from observable price magnitudes to inferred price magnitudes. At best one could say, that the inferred price magnitudes are based on observable price magnitudes, but the link between them can be rather tenuous, since specific valuation assumptions may be introduced, so that the calculation procedure goes far beyond a simple arithmetical aggregation. Purely theoretical prices used for analytical purposes, estimation or calculating alternative scenario's may have no correlate in the real world. How exactly they relate to the real world might be unknown.

The knowledge of prices may have an effect influencing trading possibilities, which in turn changes the knowledge of prices. Consequently, such knowledge is often kept confidential or is a business secret (see also information security and sociological aspects of secrecy). A price system is therefore not necessarily transparent at all, quite apart from disputes over how a price is calculated, estimated or derived.

== Are prices exact? ==
Money-prices are numbers, and numbers can be computed with exactitude. This seems to make accounting and economics exact sciences. But in the real world, prices can change quickly, due to innumerable conditions, and it may be that prices can only be "estimated" for budgetary or contractual purposes. In aggregating them, a judgement is made about the meaning of the transactions involved, and boundaries are defined for where they begin and end. Consequently, in calculating price quantities, valuation principles of some sort is usually applied, regardless of whether this is made explicit or not. And, typically, this value theory refers to prices which would apply under certain assumed (theoretical) conditions, moving between real prices and ideal prices.

In an interview with the Financial Times, the late Benoît Mandelbrot cited Louis Bachelier's thesis that prices have only one parameter defining their variability: they "can only go up or down" – and that, then, seems to provide a robust logical foundation for the mathematical modelling of price movements. But this sidesteps the qualitative problem that many different prices can be calculated for the same good, for all kinds of different purposes, using different valuation assumptions or transaction conditions. Bachelier's idea already assumes that we have a standard way to measure prices. Given that standard, one can then perform all kinds of mathematical operations on price distributions. Yet tradeable objects can also be combined and repackaged in numerous different ways, in which case the referent price may not simply go up or down, but instead refers to a different kind of deal. This issue is well known to official statisticians and economic historians, because they face the problem that the very objects whose price movements they aim to track change qualitatively across time, which may necessitate adjustments of the classification systems used to provide standard measures. A good example of that is the regimen of the consumer price index, which is periodically revised. But in times of rapid social change, the problem of devising a standard measure may be much more pervasive, because a multitude of qualitative changes occur in response to quantitative changes, all at the same time.

The mathematician John Allen Paulos stated that:

A well-known quotation, usually attributed to Einstein, is "Not everything that can be counted counts, and not everything that counts can be counted." I'd amend it to a less eloquent, more prosaic statement: unless we know how things are counted, we don't know if it's wise to count on the numbers. The problem isn't with statistical tests themselves but with what we do before and after we run them. First, we count if we can, but counting depends a great deal on previous assumptions about categorization. (...) Second, after we've gathered some numbers relating to a phenomenon, we must reasonably aggregate them into some sort of recommendation or ranking. This is not easy. By appropriate choices of criteria, measurement protocols and weights, almost any desired outcome can be reached.

It may of course be that not "almost any desired outcome can be reached" in price calculations, insofar as one would have to deny relevant evidence. Nevertheless, it may be that several different outcomes are possible, or that the presence of biases in interpreting price information can make a significant quantitative difference to the result. Insofar as economic actors or politicians have a vested self-interest in a particular quantitative result, because their income or reputation is at stake, then there is the possibility that they will prefer "one sort of calculation" to another, because it yields a financial result more favourable to their own position.

That financial result may be reasonably "credible" or "plausible" for the purpose of trading - if it was way out of kilter, trading partners would reject it - but it could involve a margin of distortion of the true situation. The small discrepancies would ordinarily not matter so much in individual transactions, but if a very large number of transactions is added up, the distortion might represent a substantial income for someone. For example, on 27 June 2012, Barclays Bank was fined $200m by the Commodity Futures Trading Commission, $150m by the United States Department of Justice and £59.5m by the Financial Services Authority for attempted manipulation of the Libor and Euribor rates (see Libor scandal).

== FASB and the epistemology of prices ==
The Financial Accounting Standards Board makes it very explicit that accounting measures for price information may not be completely exact or fully accurate, and that they may not be completely verifiable or absolutely authoritative. They may only be an approximation or estimate of a state of affairs. A price aggregate may be made up from a very large number of transactions and prices, which cannot all be individually checked, and the monetary value of which may involve a certain amount of interpretation. For example, a price may be set but we may not know for sure whether a good or asset actually traded at this price, or how far exactly the actual price paid diverged from the ordinary set price. However, the Board argues that, within certain acceptable limits of error, this is not a problem, so long as we bear in mind the practical purpose of the measures:

In summary, verifiability [in financial accounting] means no more than that several measurers are likely to obtain the same measure. It is primarily a means of attempting to cope with measurement problems stemming from the uncertainty that surrounds accounting measures and is more successful in coping with some measurement problems than others. Verification of accounting information does not guarantee that the information has a high degree of representational faithfulness, and a measure with a high degree of verifiability is not necessarily relevant to the decision for which it is intended to be useful.

== The economic calculation problem and prices ==
In the classic socialist calculation debate, economic calculation was a problem for centrally planned economies. Necessarily the central planners had to engage in price accounting, and had to use price information, but the volume and complexity of transactions was so great, that genuine central planning of the economy was often not really feasible in practice; often the state authority could only enforce the conditions of access to resources with the aid of extensive policing. An additional problem was, that much of the price information was actually false or inaccurate, because economic actors had no interest in providing truthful information, because the nominal price of goods did not reflect their value, or because goods changed hands informally in ways which could not be formally recorded and known. The effect was that the computed accounting information was often a mixture of fact and fiction.

== Pricing issues ==
Market economies often suffer from similar defects, in the sense that commercial price information is in practice deficient, false, distorted or inaccurate. This is not necessarily because trading parties intend to deceive - generally speaking, deception is bad for business reputations, at least in the long run - but simply because it is technically impossible to provide fully exact price information. Official price estimates can be inaccurate, rely on dubious valuation assumptions contrary to reality, or fail to be verified thoroughly, among other things because they rely on sample survey techniques or partial and infrequent information. Business price signals are not intrinsically always clear; they can be deceptive, understating or overstating the real situation, or present a completely false picture of transactions and values. Jean-Claude Trichet for example remarked in 2008 about the 2008 financial crisis that:

"The root cause of the crisis was a widespread undervaluation of risk. This included an underpricing of the unit of risk and an underassessment of the quantity of risk that financial operators took upon themselves".

Trichet's suggestion was that completely wrong pricing occurred, with devastating results. A "unit of risk" does not really exist. However, this category can nevertheless be thought of as the quantity of money which represents a "possible" financial loss, or the likely cost of the financial consequences, if a specific price-trend or event occurs. Risk-pricing is intrinsically a problem-fraught process, in so far as it relies on assumptions about unknowns, in advance of actual events. These unknowns may include factors that were not previously anticipated or included in the mathematical models. The modelling assumptions made in risk-pricing might either exaggerate the risk, underestimate the risk, or fail to define properly what the risks actually are - not necessarily because of any deliberate intent to deceive, but simply because some of the underlying assumptions were mistaken, or because it is technically impossible to make fully accurate and reliable forecasts.

Predicting events can be relatively simple and robust, if there are only a few variables to reckon with. But if there are a large number of variables interacting with each other at the same time, predicting what will happen can become a much more complicated task. Even if the math is flawless, the overall conceptual design of the models may be inadequate, and result in wrong predictions nevertheless.

== Price discovery and information asymmetry ==
Commenting on the information problems associated with prices, Randall S. Kroszner, a Governor of the Federal Reserve Bank of the United States, theorizes:

When a product's track record is not well established, there should be a strong market demand for information in order to facilitate price discovery. Price discovery is the process by which buyers' and sellers' preferences, as well as any other available market information, result in the "discovery" of a price that will balance supply and demand, and provide signals to market participants about how most efficiently to allocate resources. This market-determined price will, of course, be subject to change as new information becomes available, as preferences evolve, as expectations are revised, and as costs of production change. In order for this process to work most effectively, market participants must utilize information relevant to value that product. Of course, searching out and using relevant sources of information – as well as determining what information is relevant – has its own costs. To underscore the last point, with new [financial] instruments, it may not even be clear exactly what information is needed for price discovery – that is, some market participants may not know what they do not know and they may therefore terminate the information-gathering stage prematurely, unwittingly bearing the risks and costs of incomplete information.

In addition to the discrepancies between real prices and ideal prices, it may in fact be impossible at any one time to know what the "correct" price of something ought to be, even although it is being traded anyway, for an actual price. The "correct" price level is only an ideal price, namely a price at which supply and demand would tend towards balance. But because of inadequate information, that price may never be reached; supply and demand may only haphazardly adjust to each other using inadequate information. Just before the 2008 financial crisis, The Wall Street Journal reported that

"Today, 'way less than half' of all securities trade on exchanges with readily available price information, according to Goldman Sachs Group Inc. analyst Daniel Harris. More and more securities are priced by dealers who don't publish quotes. As a result, money managers can no longer gauge with certainty the value of some assets in mutual funds, hedge funds and other investment vehicles..."

The reassurance of a self-balancing market does not matter much when people are making money, but when they do not, they become very concerned with market imbalances (mismatch of supply and demand). When the information needed to calculate prices is inadequate for any reason, it becomes susceptible to swindles, confidence tricks and fraud which may be difficult to detect or combat, insofar as the trading parties have to make assumptions in interpreting price information where any "misunderstanding" is their own responsibility. The risks and risk-bearers may not be fully specifiable. In this context, the Stanford Encyclopedia of Philosophy states:

"When there is a risk, there must be something that is unknown or that has an unknown outcome. Therefore, knowledge about risk is knowledge about lack of knowledge. This combination of knowledge and lack thereof contributes to making issues of risk complicated from an epistemological point of view."

This problem is compounded if various extrapolated ideal prices used to guide economic actors rely on observed trends in real prices which fluctuate a great deal in ways that are difficult to predict, and if the predictions made themselves influence price levels. It plays an important role in the theory of information asymmetry to which Joseph Stiglitz has made important contributions.

Price information is likely to be reliable,

- if market actors have a self-interest in providing true information,
- if it is technically possible to obtain true and accurate information, and
- if there are comprehensive legal sanctions (penalties) for deliberately presenting false price information.

But additionally, any market cannot function unless participants show trust and cooperation, and are motivated to do so.

== See also ==
- Comparative statics
- Economic calculation problem
- Exchange value
- Heterodox economics
- Price
- Real versus nominal value (economics)
- Reproduction (economics)
- Shadow price
- Value-form
- Valuation (finance)
