= Use value =

How well a commodity fulfills human purposes

Use-value (German: Gebrauchswert; Nutzwert) or value in use is a concept in classical political economy and Marxist economics. It refers to the tangible features of a commodity (a tradeable object) which can satisfy some human requirement, want or need, or which serves a useful purpose. For example, gold may be used as a means of exchange, as a decorative object, or one of the most efficient electrical conductors (and used extensively in electronic components for that reason).

In Karl Marx's critique of political economy, any commodity has an exchange value and is a use-value — the former manifestly appearing as exchange-value in any exchange-relation in which bearers of commodities mutually alienate and appropriate each-others commodities on the market, it's foremost the proportion in which any commodity is exchangeable for any commodities, its form as the money form within money economies. Marx acknowledges that commodities being traded also have a general utility, implied by the fact that people want them, but he argues that this by itself says nothing about the specific character of the economy in which they are produced and sold.

== Origin of the concept ==
The concepts of value, use-value, utility, exchange value, and price have a very long history in economic and philosophical thought. From Aristotle to Adam Smith and David Ricardo, their meanings have evolved. Smith recognized that commodities may have an exchange-value but may satisfy no use-value, such as diamonds, while a commodity with a very high use-value may have a very low exchange-value, such as water. Marx comments for example that "in English writers of the 17th century we frequently find worth in the sense of value in use, and value in the sense of exchange-value." With the expansion of market economy, however, the focus of economists has increasingly been on prices and price-relations, the social process of exchange as such being assumed to occur as a naturally given fact.

In The Economic and Philosophic Manuscripts of 1844, Marx emphasizes that the use-value of a labour-product is practical and objectively determined; that is, it inheres in the intrinsic characteristics of a product that enable it to satisfy a human need or want. The use-value of a product therefore exists as a material reality according to social needs regardless of the individual need of any particular person. The use-value of a commodity is specifically a social use-value, meaning that it has a generally accepted use-value for others in society, and not just for the producer.

== Marx's definition ==
Marx first defines use-value precisely in A Contribution to the Critique of Political Economy (1859) where he explains:

To begin with, a commodity, in the language of the English economists, is 'any thing necessary, useful or pleasant in life,' an object of human wants, a means of existence in the widest sense of the term. Use-value as an aspect of the commodity coincides with the physical palpable existence of the commodity. Wheat, for example, is a distinct use-value differing from the use-values of cotton, glass, paper, etc. A use-value has value only in use, and is realized only in the process of consumption. One and the same use-value can be used in various ways. But the extent of its possible application is limited by its existence as an object with distinct properties. It is, moreover, determined not only qualitatively but also quantitatively. Different use-values have different measures appropriate to their physical characteristics; for example, a bushel of wheat, a quire of paper, a yard of linen. Whatever its social form may be, wealth always consists of use-values, which in the first instance are not affected by this form. From the taste of wheat it is not possible to tell who produced it, a Russian serf, a French peasant or an English capitalist. Although use-values serve social needs and therefore exist within the social framework, they do not express the social relations of production. For instance, let us take as a use-value a commodity such as a diamond. We cannot tell by looking at it that the diamond is a commodity. Where it serves as an aesthetic or mechanical use-value, on the neck of a courtesan or in the hand of a glass-cutter, it is a diamond and not a commodity. To be a use-value is evidently a necessary prerequisite of the commodity, but it is immaterial to the use-value whether it is a commodity. Use-value as such, since it is independent of the determinate economic form, lies outside the sphere of investigation of political economy. It belongs in this sphere only when it is itself a determinate form. Use-value is the immediate physical entity in which a definite economic relationship—exchange-value—is expressed.

The concept is also introduced at the beginning of Das Kapital, where Marx writes, but in the extract below he holds it up as a critique of Hegel's liberal "Philosophy of Right". He remained a sharp critic of what was to the Marxian view a destructive philosophy:

The utility of a thing makes it a use value. But this utility is not a thing of air. Being limited by the physical properties of the commodity, it has no existence apart from that commodity. A commodity, such as iron, corn, or a diamond, is therefore, so far as it is a material thing, a use value, something useful. This property of a commodity is independent of the amount of labour required to appropriate its useful qualities. When treating of use value, we always assume to be dealing with definite quantities, such as dozens of watches, yards of linen, or tons of iron. The use values of commodities furnish the material for a special study, that of the commercial knowledge of commodities. Use values become a reality only by use or consumption: they also constitute the substance of all wealth, whatever may be the social form of that wealth. In the form of society we are about to consider, they are, in addition, the material depositories of exchange value."

This was a direct reference by Marx to Hegel's Elements of the Philosophy of Right §63 as Marx adds:

A thing can be a use value, without having value. This is the case whenever its utility to man is not due to labour. Such are air, virgin soil, natural meadows, &c. A thing can be useful, and the product of human labour, without being a commodity. Whoever directly satisfies his wants with the produce of his own labour, creates, indeed, use values, but not commodities. In order to produce the latter, he must not only produce use values, but use values for others, social use values. (And not only for others, without more. The mediaeval peasant produced quit-rent-corn for his feudal lord and tithe-corn for his parson. But neither the quit-rent-corn nor the tithe-corn became commodities by reason of the fact that they had been produced for others. To become a commodity a product must be transferred to another, whom it will serve as a use value, by means of an exchange.) Lastly nothing can have value, without being an object of utility. If the thing is useless, so is the labour contained in it; the labour does not count as labour, and therefore creates no value.

Marx acknowledges that a nominal price or value can be imputed to goods or assets which are not reproducible goods and not produced by human labour, as correctly noted later by Engels that a product is not necessarily a commodity. However Marx generally holds that only human labour expended can create value compared with Nature, through instrumentation known as modus operandi, or the method of working. (Note: Only later did the phrase modus operandi (Lat.) come to primarily refer to the distinctive behavior of a criminal in the language of the law.)

== Transformation into a commodity ==
"As exchange-values, all commodities are merely definite quantities of congealed labour-time", wrote Karl Marx. The discrepancy of the true purpose of value came to be one of the biggest sources of conflict between capital and labour. The transformation of a use-value into a social use-value and into a commodity (the process of commodification) is not automatic or spontaneous, but has technical, social and political preconditions. For example, it must be possible to trade it, and to transfer ownership or access rights to it from one person or organization to another in a secure way. There must also be a real market demand for it. And all that may depend greatly on the nature of the use-value itself, as well as the ability to package, store, preserve and transport it. In the case of information or communication as use-values, transforming them into commodities may be a complex and problem-fraught process.

Thus, the objective characteristics of use-values are very important for understanding (1) the development and expansion of market trade, and (2) necessary technical relationships between different economic activities (e.g. supply chains). To produce a car, for example, you objectively require steel, and this steel is required, regardless of what its price might be. Necessary relationships therefore exist between different use-values, because they are technically, materially and practically related. Some authors therefore write about an "industrial complex" or "technological complex", indicating thereby how different technological products are linked in a system. A good example would be all the different products involved in the production and use of motor cars.

The category of use-value is also important in distinguishing different economic sectors according to their specific type of output. Following Quesnay's analysis of economic reproduction, Marx distinguished between the economic sector producing means of production and the sectors producing consumer goods and luxuries. In modern national accounts more subtle distinctions are made, for example between primary, secondary and tertiary production, semi-durable and durable goods, and so on.

== Role in political economy ==
In his textbook The Theory of Capitalist Development (1942), American Marxist Paul Sweezy claimed:

Use-value is an expression of a certain relation between the consumer and the object consumed. Political economy, on the other hand, is a social science of the relations between people. It follows that 'use-value as such' lies outside the sphere of investigation of political economy.

Marx explicitly rejected Sweezy and Uno's interpretation of use-value (see the previously cited quotation from 1859, in which use-value is distinguished from the general concept of utility). In a draft included in the Grundrisse manuscripts, which inspired the starting point of A Contribution to the Critique of Political Economy and Das Kapital, Marx states:

The commodity itself appears as unity of two aspects. It is use value, i.e. object of the satisfaction of any system whatever of human needs. This is its material side, which the most disparate epochs of production may have in common, and whose examination therefore lies beyond political economy. Use value falls within the realm of political economy as soon as it becomes modified by the modern relations of production, or as it, in turn, intervenes to modify them. What it is customary to say about it in general terms, for the sake of good form, is confined to commonplaces which had a historic value in the first beginnings of the science, when the social forms of bourgeois production had still laboriously to be peeled out of the material, and, at great effort, to be established as independent objects of study. In fact, however, the use value of the commodity is a given presupposition—the material basis in which a specific economic relation presents itself. It is only this specific relation which stamps the use value as a commodity.

— Karl Marx, Fragment on Value, in: Grundrisse, Notebook 7 (1858), emphasis added

In his text The Making of Marx's 'Capital', Roman Rosdolsky explains the role of use value in Marx's economics. Marx himself, in the introduction to his Grundrisse manuscript, had defined the economic sphere as the totality of production, circulation, distribution and consumption. However, as Marx did not live to finish Das Kapital, he did not theorise how commercial relations would reshape the sphere of personal consumption in accordance with the requirements of capital accumulation.

Minor issues remained from these neoclassical theories, such as the question of the proper empirical definition of capital and labour in the laws of factor substitution. Other empirical issues include the so-called Solow Residual in which the heterogenous nature of labour is thoroughly explored for its qualitative elements beyond differentiation, and the concept of total factor productivity, prompting some to consider such things as technology, human capital, and stock of knowledge. Later scholars, such as Walter Benjamin, Fernand Braudel, Ben Fine, Manuel Castells and Michel Aglietta attempted to fill the gap in Marx's unfinished work. In modern times the theory has been extended to conclude that conversion of energy-driven work does not rely on labour-intensive inputs; thus use can be unsupervised work that develops a notion of human capital.

Equation: A = P + hL (A, the Concept of Substitutive Work = P, the loss of Primary Productive Energy (which is P/Ep, the coefficient of efficiency) + h, the units of energy (which is the energy consumed by workers during work done) * L, Labour time per hour)

== Utility ==
Marx's concept of use-value seems akin to, but in reality differs from the neoclassical concept of utility:

- Marx usually assumes in his analysis that products sold in the market have a use-value to the buyer, without attempting to quantify that use-value other than in product units of price, and commodity value. (this caused some of his readers to think wrongly that use-value played no role in his theory). "The utility makes it a use value," The neoclassicals, on the other hand, typically see prices as the quantitative expression of the general utility of products for buyers and sellers, instead of expressing their exchange-value. For "Price is the money-name of the labour realised in a commodity".
- In neoclassical economics, this utility is ultimately subjectively determined by the buyer of a good, and not objectively by the intrinsic characteristics of the good. Thus, neoclassical economists often talk about the marginal utility of a product, i.e., how its utility fluctuates according to consumption patterns. This kind of utility is a "general utility" which exists independently from particular uses that can be made of a product, the assumption being that if somebody wants, demands, desires or needs a good, then it has this general utility. According to his supporters Marx would have allegedly rejected the concept of marginal utility precisely because it accentuated profit on capital returns over the usefulness or utility of labour. Thus the wider application of general utility lay in variable rates of productivity, since higher labour inputs could raise or lower the price of commodity. This was the true concept of Use as a Value system: the higher the rate of 'productiveness' the more labour 'crystallised' in the article.
- Marx rejects any economic doctrine of consumer sovereignty, stating among other things in his first chapter to Das Kapital that "In bourgeois societies the economic fictio juris prevails, that every one, as a buyer, possesses an encyclopaedic knowledge of commodities".

In summary, different concepts of use value lead to different interpretations and explanations of trade, commerce and capitalism. Marx's main argument is that if we focus only on the general utility of a commodity, we abstract from and ignore precisely the specific social relations of production which created it.

== "Indifference" of capitalists ==
Some academics such as Professor Robert Albritton, a Canadian political scientist, have claimed that according to Marx, capitalists are basically "indifferent" to the use-value of the goods and services in which they trade, since what matters to capitalists is just the money they make; whatever the buyer does with the goods and services produced is, so it seems, of no real concern.

But this is arguably a misunderstanding of business activity and the bourgeoisie as a class. Marx thought that capitalists can never be totally "indifferent" to use-values, because inputs of sufficient quality (labour, materials, equipment) must be bought and managed to produce outputs that:

- will sell at an adequate profit;
- are legally permitted by the state to be sold;
- do not destroy the reputation of the supplier (with its obvious effect on sales).

For this purpose, the inputs in production must moreover be used in an economical way, and care must be taken not to waste resources to the extent that this would mean additional costs for an enterprise, or reduce productivity. The Theory of Use Values relates directly to human labour and the power of machines to destroy value, "Living labour must seize on these things, awaken them from the dead, change them from merely possible into real and effective use values".

It is just that from the point of view of the financier or investor, the main concern is not what exactly is being produced as such or how useful that is for society, but whether the investment can make a profit for him. If the products of the enterprise being invested in sell and make a profit, then that is regarded as sufficient indication of usefulness. Even so, the investor is obviously interested in "the state of the market" for the enterprise's products—if certain products are being used less or used more, this affects sales and profits. So to evaluate "the state of the market", the investor needs knowledge about the place of a product in the value chain and how it is being used.

Often, Marx assumed in Das Kapital for argument's sake that supply and demand will balance, and that products do sell. Even so, Marx carefully defines the production process both as a labour process creating use-values, and a valorisation process creating new value. He asserts only that "capital in general" as an abstract social power, or as a property claim to surplus value, is indifferent to particular use-values—what matters in this financial relation is only whether more value can be appropriated through the exchanges that occur. Most share-holders are not interested in whether a company actually satisfies customers, they want an adequate profit on their investment (but a countertrend is so-called "socially responsible investing").

In modern times, business leaders are often very concerned with total quality management in production, which has become the object of scientific studies, as well as a new source of industrial conflict, since attempts are made to integrate everything a worker is and does (both their creative potential and how they relate to others) in the battle for improved quality. In that case, it could be argued not just labour power but the whole person is a use-value (see further Richard Sennett's books such as The Culture of the New Capitalism, Yale (2006). Some regard this practice as a kind of "wage-slavery".

From beginning to end, and from production to consumption, use-value and exchange-value form a dialectical unity. If this is not fully clear from Marx's writings, that is perhaps mainly because he never theorised the sphere of final consumption in any detail, nor the way in which commerce reshapes the way that final consumption takes place.

== See also ==
- Labor theory of value – Theory in classical and Marxian economics
- Productivity – Average measure of the efficiency of production
- Sign value – Philosophical concept
- Theory of value (economics) – Theoretical analysis
- Value-form – Concept in Marxist theory

== Bibliography ==
- Karl Marx, Capital, (1867) I, II & III, Progress Publishers, Moscow, 85,94.
- Karl Marx, Theories of Surplus Value, (1861) Parts I, II and III, Progress Press, Moscow.
- Karl Marx, Economic And Philosophic Manuscripts of 1844, (1845) International Publishers, New York.
- Karl Marx, (1859.) A Contribution to the Critique of Political Economy, Progress Publishers, Moscow.
- Karl Marx, (1857.) Grundrisse, Penguin, Middlesex.
- Rosdolsky, Roman (1977). "The Making of Marx's 'Capital'". London: Pluto Press.
- Isaac I. Rubin, Essays in Marx's Theory of Value (Detroit: Red & Black, 1972), chapter 17: "Value and social need"
- Clarke, Simon (1982). Marx, marginalism, and modern sociology: from Adam Smith to Max Weber. London: The Macmillan Press, Ltd.
- Green, Francis; Nore, Petter (1977). Economics: An Anti-Text. London: Macmillan.
- Groll, S. (1980). "The Active Role of Use Value' In Marx's Economics". History of Political Economy. 12 (3): 336–371. doi:10.1215/00182702-12-3-336.
- Orzech, Z.B. (1987). "Technical Progress And Values in Marx's Theory of the Decline in the Rate of Profit: An Exegetical Approach". History of Political Economy. 19 (4): 591–613. doi:10.1215/00182702-19-4-591.
- Marx-Engels-Lenin Institute, (Ed). (1951), 62. Karl Marx And Friedrich Engels: Selected Works, I& II, Foreign Languages Publishing House, Moscow.
- Mclennan, D. (1971.) Karl Marx: Early Texts, Basil Blackwell, Oxford.
- Meek, R.L. (1973.) Studies in the Labor Theory of Value, 2nd Edition, Lawrence & Wishart, London.
