= Lie =

Intentionally false statement made to deceive

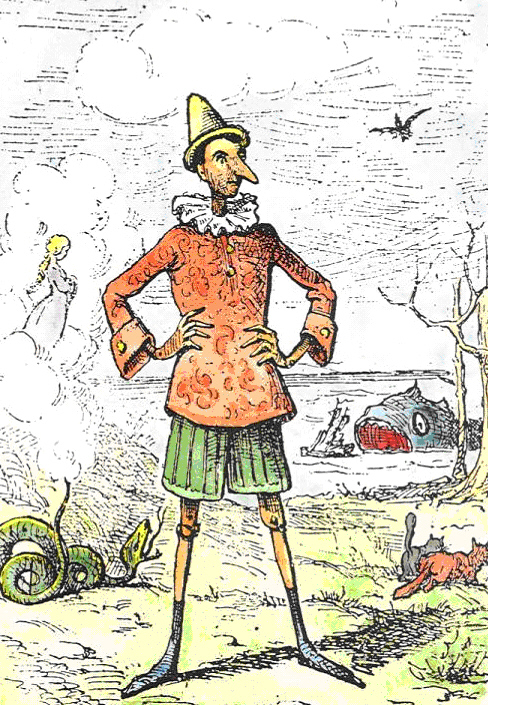
The fictional character Pinocchio is a common depiction of a liar.

A lie is an assertion that is believed to be false, typically used with the intention of deceiving or misleading someone. The practice of communicating lies is called lying. A person who communicates a lie may be termed a liar. Lies can be interpreted as deliberately false statements or misleading statements, though not all statements that are literally false are considered lies – metaphors, hyperboles, and other figurative rhetoric are not intended to mislead, while lies are explicitly meant for literal interpretation by their audience. Lies may also serve a variety of instrumental, interpersonal, or psychological functions for the individuals who use them.

Generally, the term "lie" carries a negative connotation, and depending on the context a person who communicates a lie may be subject to social, legal, religious, or criminal sanctions; for instance, perjury, or the act of lying under oath, can result in criminal and civil charges being pressed against the perjurer.

Although people in many cultures believe that deception can be detected by observing nonverbal behaviors (e.g. not making eye contact, fidgeting, stuttering, smiling) research indicates that people overestimate both the significance of such cues and their ability to make accurate judgements about deception. More generally, people's ability to make true judgments is affected by biases towards accepting incoming information and interpreting feelings as evidence of truth. People do not always check incoming assertions against their memory.

== Types and associated terms ==
- A barefaced, bald-faced or bold-faced lie is an impudent, brazen, shameless, flagrant, or audacious lie that is sometimes but not always undisguised. Even if undisguised, it is not always obvious to those hearing it.
- A big lie is one that attempts to trick the victim into believing something major, which will likely be contradicted by some information the victim already possesses, or by their common sense. When the lie is of sufficient magnitude it may succeed, due to the victim's reluctance to believe that an untruth on such a grand scale would indeed be concocted.
- A black lie is told to harm someone else; it is "spiteful" when it harms the liar but "selfish" when it benefits them.
- A blue lie is a form of lying that is told purportedly to benefit a collective or "in the name of the collective good". The term "blue lie" possibly comes from cases where police officers made false statements to protect the police force or ensure the success of a legal case against an accused.
- An April fool is a lie or hoax told or performed on April Fools' Day.
- To bluff is to pretend to have a capability or intention one does not possess.
- Bullshit (also B.S., bullcrap, bull) does not necessarily have to be a complete fabrication. While a lie is related by a speaker who believes what is said is false, bullshit is offered by a speaker who does not care whether what is said is true because the speaker is more concerned with giving the hearer some impression. Thus, bullshit may be either true or false, but demonstrates a lack of concern for the truth that is likely to lead to falsehoods.
- A cover-up is used to deny, defend, or obfuscate previously made lies, errors or misdeeds.
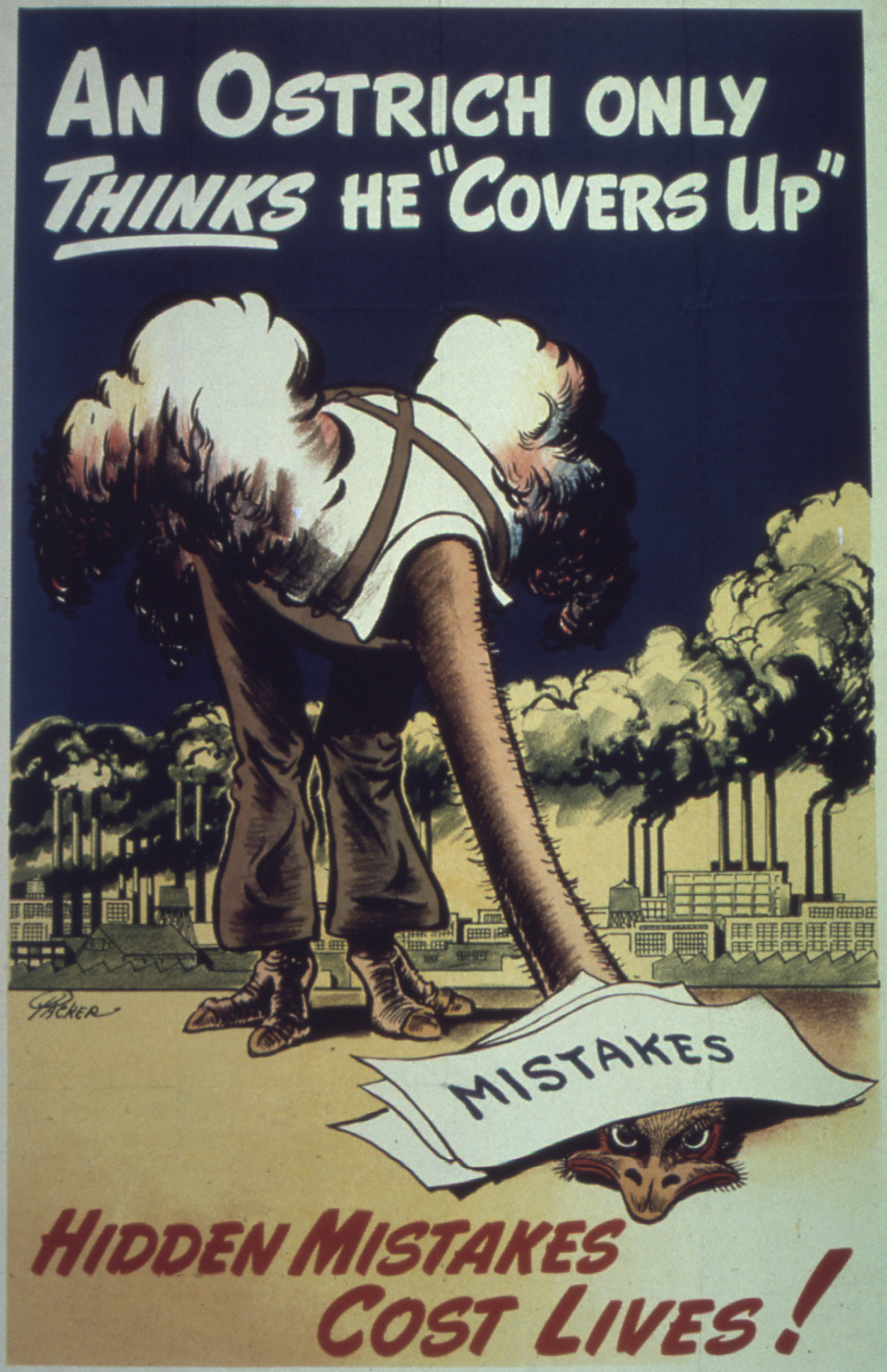
  A motivational poster about lying declares "An ostrich only thinks he 'covers up'"
- Defamation is the communication of a false statement that harms the reputation of an individual person, business, product, group, government, religion, or nation.
- To deflect is to avoid the subject that the lie is about, not giving attention to the lie. When attention is given to the subject the lie is based around, deflectors ignore or refuse to respond. Skillful deflectors are passive-aggressive, who when confronted with the subject choose to ignore and not respond.
- Disinformation is intentionally false or misleading information that is spread in a calculated way to deceive target audiences.
- An exaggeration occurs when the most fundamental aspects of a statement are true, but only to a certain degree. It also is seen as "stretching the truth" or making something appear more powerful, meaningful, or real than it is. Saying that someone devoured most of something when they only ate half is considered an exaggeration. An exaggeration might be easily found to be a hyperbole where a person's statement (i.e. in informal speech, such as "He did this one million times already!") is meant not to be understood literally.
- Fake news is supposed to be a type of yellow journalism that consists of deliberate misinformation or hoaxes spread via traditional print and broadcast news media or online social media. Sometimes the term is applied as a deceptive device to deflect attention from uncomfortable truths and facts.
  Infographic How to spot fake news published by the International Federation of Library Associations and Institutions
- A fib is a lie that is easy to forgive due to its subject being a trivial matter; for example, a child may tell a fib by claiming that the family dog broke a household vase, when the child was the one who broke it.
- Fraud refers to the act of inducing another person or people to believe a lie in order to secure material or financial gain for the liar. Depending on the context, fraud may subject the liar to civil or criminal penalties.
- A half-truth or partial truth is a deceptive statement that includes some element of truth. The statement might be partly true, the statement may be totally true, but only part of the whole truth, or it may employ some deceptive element, such as improper punctuation or double meaning, especially if the intent is to deceive, evade, blame, or misrepresent the truth. Partial truths are characterized by malicious intent, and therefore, honest people should not excuse them as containing a "rational kernel."
- Confabulation is fabricated information given because the speaker misremembers or has false memories. It is technically not a lie, since the "liar" neither knows he is incorrect nor intends to deceive others.
- Jocose lies are lies meant in jest, intended to be understood as such by all present parties. Teasing and irony are examples. A more elaborate instance is seen in some storytelling traditions, where the storyteller's insistence that the story is the absolute truth, despite all evidence to the contrary (i.e., tall tale), is considered humorous. There is debate about whether these are "real" lies, and different philosophers hold different views. The Crick Crack Club in London arranges a yearly "Grand Lying Contest" with the winner being awarded the coveted "Hodja Cup" (named for the Mulla Nasreddin: "The truth is something I have never spoken."). The winner in 2010 was Hugh Lupton. In the United States, the Burlington Liars' Club awards an annual title to the "World Champion Liar."
- Lie-to-children is a phrase that describes a simplified explanation of technical or complex subjects as a teaching method for children and laypeople. While lies-to-children are useful in teaching complex subjects to people who are new to the concepts discussed, they can promote the creation of misconceptions among the people who listen to them. The phrase has been incorporated by academics within the fields of biology, evolution, bioinformatics, and the social sciences. Media use of the term has extended to publications including The Conversation and Forbes.
- Lying by omission, also known as a continuing misrepresentation or quote mining, occurs when an important fact is left out in order to foster a misconception. Lying by omission includes the failure to correct pre-existing misconceptions. For example, when the seller of a car declares it has been serviced regularly, but does not mention that a fault was reported during the last service, the seller lies by omission. It may be compared to dissimulation. An omission is when a person tells most of the truth, but leaves out a few key facts that therefore, completely obscures the truth.
- Lying in trade occurs when the seller of a product or service may advertise untrue facts about the product or service in order to gain sales, especially by competitive advantage. Many countries and states have enacted consumer protection laws intended to combat such fraud.
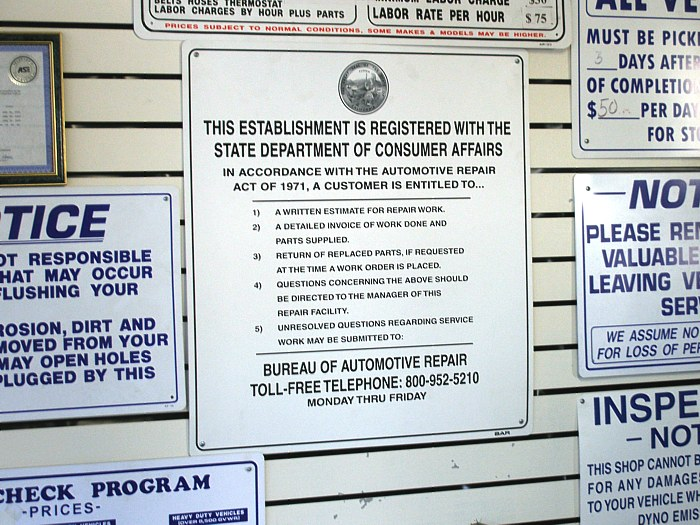
  Consumer protection laws often mandate the posting of notices, such as this one which appears in all automotive repair shops in California.
- A memory hole is a mechanism for the alteration or disappearance of inconvenient or embarrassing documents, photographs, transcripts, or other records, such as from a website or other archive, particularly as part of an attempt to give the impression that something never happened.
- Mutual deceit is a situation wherein lying is both accepted and expected or that the parties mutually accept the deceit in question. This can be demonstrated in the case of a poker game wherein the strategies rely on deception and bluffing to win.
- A noble lie, which also could be called a strategic untruth, is one that normally would cause discord if uncovered, but offers some benefit to the liar and assists in an orderly society, therefore, potentially being beneficial to others. It is often told to maintain law, order, and safety.
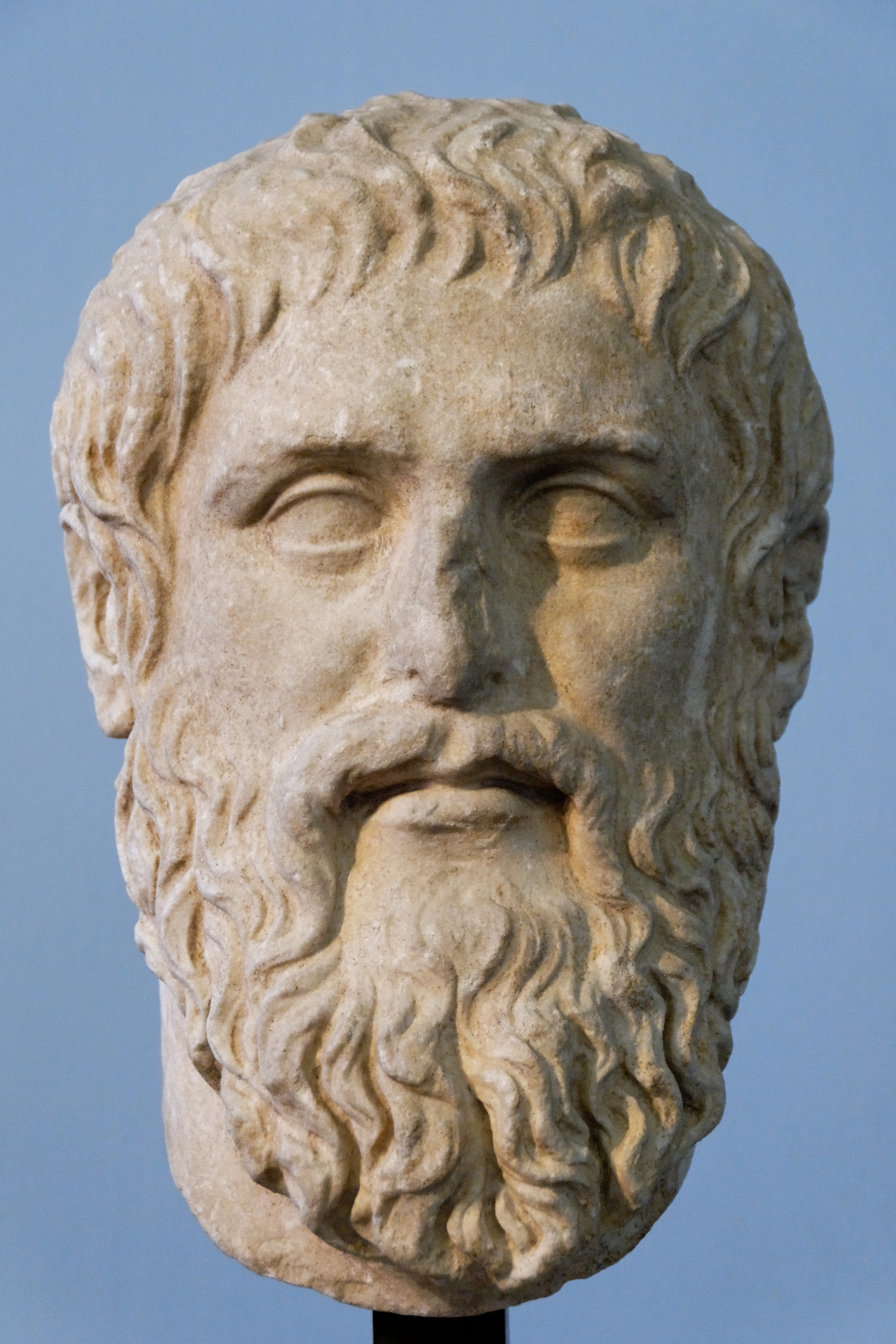
  Plato presented arguments to justify the use of noble lies in his Republic.
- Paltering is the active use of selective truthful statements to mislead.
- Paternalistic deception is a lie told because it is believed (possibly incorrectly) that the deceived person will benefit.
- In psychiatry, pathological lying (also called compulsive lying, pseudologia fantastica, and mythomania) is a behavior of habitual or compulsive lying. It was first described in the medical literature in 1891 by Anton Delbrueck. Although it is a controversial topic, pathological lying has been defined as "falsification entirely disproportionate to any discernible end in view, may be extensive and very complicated, and may manifest over a period of years or even a lifetime". The individual may be aware they are lying, or may believe they are telling the truth, being unaware that they are relating fantasies.
- Perjury is the act of lying or making verifiably false statements on a material matter under oath or affirmation in court, or in any of various sworn statements in writing. Perjury is a crime, because the witness has sworn to tell the truth, and for the credibility of the court to remain intact, witness testimony must be relied on as truthful.
- A polite lie is a lie that a politeness standard requires, and that usually is known to be untrue by both parties. Whether such lies are acceptable is heavily dependent on culture. A common polite lie in international etiquette may be to decline invitations because of "scheduling difficulties", or due to "diplomatic illness". Similarly, the butler lie is a small lie that usually is sent electronically and is used to terminate conversations or to save face.
- Puffery is an exaggerated claim typically found in advertising and publicity announcements, such as "the highest quality at the lowest price", or "always votes in the best interest of all the people". Such statements are unlikely to be true – but cannot be proven false and so, do not violate trade laws, especially as the consumer is expected to be able to determine that it is not the absolute truth.
- The phrase "speaking with a forked tongue" means to deliberately say one thing and mean another or, to be hypocritical, or act in a duplicitous manner. This phrase was adopted by Americans around the time of the Revolution, and may be found in abundant references from the early nineteenth century – often reporting on American officers who sought to convince the Indigenous peoples of the Americas with whom they negotiated that they "spoke with a straight and not with a forked tongue" (as for example, President Andrew Jackson told members of the Creek Nation in 1829). According to one 1859 account, the proverb that the "white man spoke with a forked tongue" originated in the 1690s, in the descriptions by the indigenous peoples of French colonials in America inviting members of the Iroquois Confederacy to attend a peace conference, but when the Iroquois arrived, the French had set an ambush and proceeded to slaughter and capture the Iroquois.
- A therapeutic fib is lying, or bending the truth, in order to avoid increased agitation from a person with dementia. The intent is not to deceive the patient, but rather to help them feel safe and secure in facing an otherwise upsetting situation or fact.
- Weasel word is an informal term for words and phrases aimed at creating an impression that a specific or meaningful statement has been made, when in fact only a vague or ambiguous claim has been communicated, enabling the specific meaning to be denied if the statement is challenged. A more formal term is equivocation.
- A white lie is a harmless or trivial lie, especially one told in order to be polite or to avoid hurting someone's feelings or stopping them from being upset by the truth. A white lie also is considered a lie to be used for greater good (pro-social behavior). It sometimes is used to shield someone from a hurtful or emotionally-damaging truth, especially when not knowing the truth is deemed by the liar as completely harmless. However, white lies can still be harmful as they can foster distrust when used in inappropriate situations.
- Vranyo is a Russian word that may refer to dishonesty in general, but can also describe a more nuanced, context-dependent phenomenon. It may describe a lie that lacks practical utility and an intent to deceive; an unserious or cynical performance where the speaker is unconcerned with whether they are believed. From the point of view of the speaker, it represents an attempt at a "better" truth. The function may range from an aspirational tall tale to a dismissive excuse. Many experts associate the term with Russian disinformation.

== Capacity to lie ==
It is asserted that the capacity to lie is a talent human beings possess universally.

The evolutionary theory proposed by Darwin states that only the fittest will survive and by lying, we aim to improve other's perception of our social image and status, capability, and desirability in general. Studies have shown that humans begin lying at a mere age of six months, through crying and laughing, to gain attention.

Stereotypically speaking, David Livingstone Smith asserts that men like to exaggerate about their sexual expertise, but shy away from topics that degrade them while women understate their sexual expertise to make themselves more respectable and loyal in the eyes of men and avoid being labelled as a 'scarlet woman'.

Those with Parkinson's disease show difficulties in deceiving others, difficulties that link to prefrontal hypometabolism. This suggests a link between the capacity for dishonesty and integrity of prefrontal functioning.

Pseudologia fantastica is a term applied by psychiatrists to the behavior of habitual or compulsive lying. Mythomania is the condition where there is an excessive or abnormal propensity for lying and exaggerating.

A recent study found that composing a lie takes longer than telling the truth. Or, as Chief Joseph succinctly put it, "It does not require many words to speak the truth."

Some people who are not convincing liars truly believe they are.

== When people lie ==
Williams et al. refer to research finding that "in an average 10-minute business conversation, most people will tell a lie 2.9 times, often using "always", "never", "nobody", or "everybody" to distance themselves from the lie.

Scientific studies have shown differences in forms of lying across gender. Although men and women lie at equal frequencies, men are more likely to lie in order to please themselves while women are more likely to lie to please others. The presumption is that humans are individuals living in a world of competition and strict social norms, where they are able to use lies and deception to enhance chances of survival and reproduction.

== Consequences ==
The potential consequences of lying are manifold; some in particular are worth considering. Typically lies aim to deceive, so the hearer may acquire a false belief (or at least something that the speaker believes to be false). When deception is unsuccessful, a lie may be discovered. The discovery of a lie may discredit other statements by the same speaker, thereby staining that speaker's reputation. In some circumstances, it may also negatively affect the social or legal standing of the speaker. Lying in a court of law, for instance, is a criminal offense (perjury).

Hannah Arendt spoke about extraordinary cases in which an entire society is being lied to consistently. She said that the consequences of such lying are "not that you believe the lies, but rather that nobody believes anything any longer. This is because lies, by their very nature, have to be changed, and a lying government has constantly to rewrite its own history. On the receiving end you get not only one lie – a lie which you could go on for the rest of your days – but you get a great number of lies, depending on how the political wind blows."

== Detection ==
The question of whether lies can be detected reliably through nonverbal behavior has been the subject of frequent study. While people in many cultures believe that deception can be indicated by behaviors such as looking away, fidgeting, or stammering, this is not supported by research. A 2019 review of research on deception and its detection through nonverbal behavior concludes that people tend to overestimate both the reliability of nonverbal behavior as an indicator of deception, and their ability to make accurate judgements about deception based on nonverbal behavior.

Polygraph "lie detector" machines measure the physiological stress a subject endures in a number of measures while giving statements or answering questions. Spikes in stress indicators are purported to reveal lying. The accuracy of this method is widely disputed. In several well-known cases, application of the technique has been shown to have given incorrect results. Nonetheless, it remains in use in many areas, primarily as a method for eliciting confessions or employment screening. The unreliability of polygraph results is the basis of the exclusion of such evaluations as admissible evidence in many courts, and the technique is generally perceived to be an example of pseudoscience.

A recent study found that composing a lie takes longer than telling the truth and thus, the time taken to answer a question may be used as a method of lie detection. Instant answers with a lie may be proof of a prepared lie. A recommendation provided to resolve that contradiction is to try to surprise the subject and find a midway answer, not too quick, nor too long.

== Ethics ==
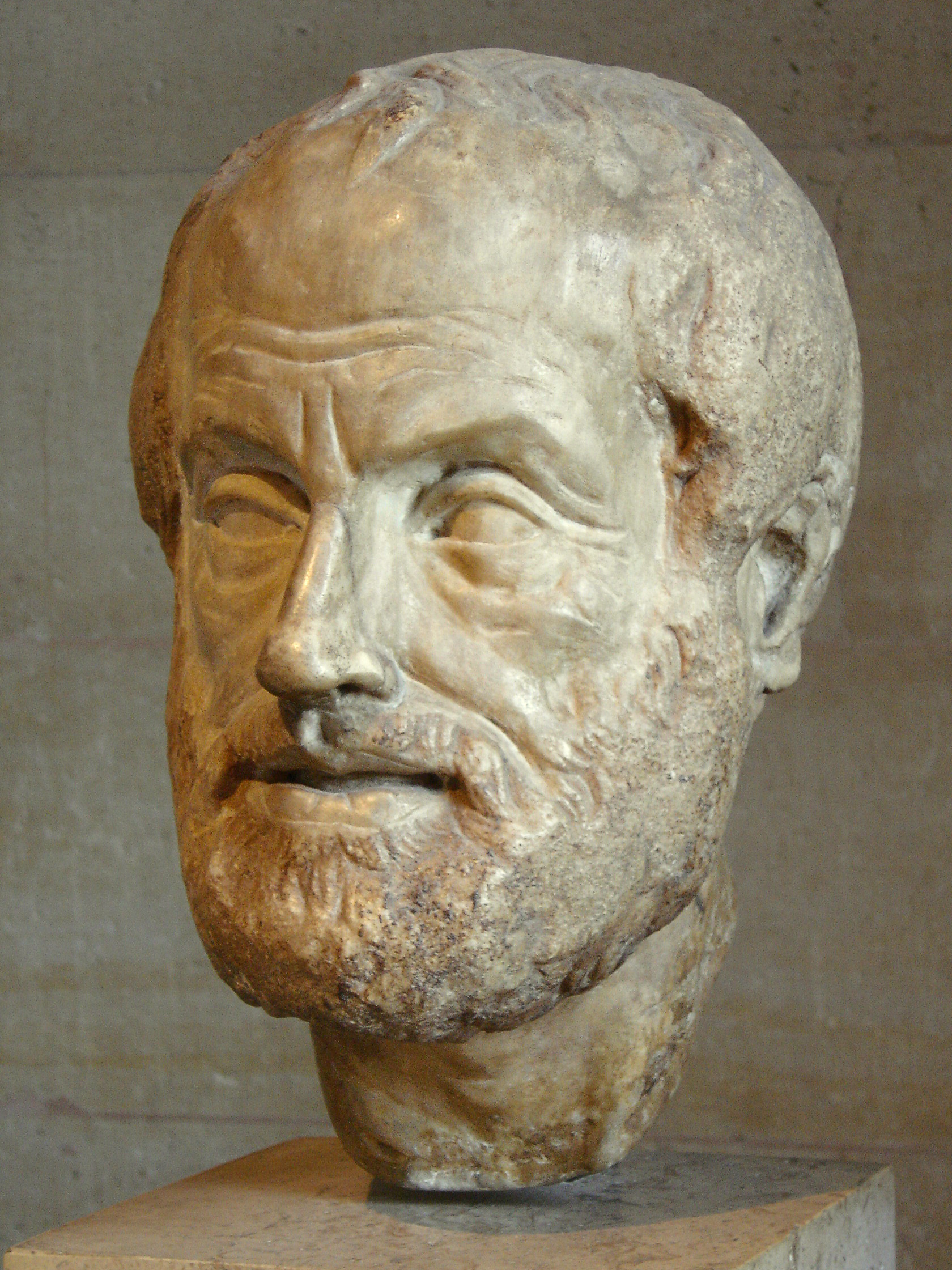
Portrait bust of Aristotle made by Lysippos

Utilitarian philosophers have supported lies that achieve good outcomes – white lies. In his 2008 book, How to Make Good Decisions and Be Right All the Time, Iain King suggested a credible rule on lying was possible, and he defined it as: "Deceive only if you can change behaviour in a way worth more than the trust you would lose, were the deception discovered (whether the deception actually is exposed or not)."

Stanford law professor Deborah L. Rhode articulated three rules she says ethicists generally agree distinguish "white lies" from harmful lies or cheating:

- A disinterested observer would conclude that the benefits outweigh the harms
- There is no alternative
- If everyone in similar circumstances acted similarly, society would be no worse off

Aristotle believed no general rule on lying was possible, because anyone who advocated lying could never be believed, he said. The philosophers St. Augustine, St. Thomas Aquinas, and Immanuel Kant, condemned all lying. According to all three, there are no circumstances in which, ethically, one may lie. Even if the only way to protect oneself is to lie, it is never ethically permissible to lie even in the face of murder, torture, or any other hardship. Each of these philosophers gave several arguments for the ethical basis against lying, all compatible with each other. Among the more important arguments are:

- Lying is a perversion of the natural faculty of speech, the natural end of which is to communicate the thoughts of the speaker.
- When one lies, one undermines trust in society.

In Lying, neuroscientist Sam Harris argues that lying is negative for the liar and the person who is being lied to. To tell lies is to deny others access to reality, and the harm of lying often cannot be anticipated. The ones lied to may fail to solve problems they could have solved only on a basis of good information. To lie also harms oneself, making the liar distrust the person who is being lied to. Liars generally feel badly about their lies and sense a loss of sincerity, authenticity, and integrity. Harris asserts that honesty allows one to have deeper relationships and to bring all dysfunction in one's life to the surface.

In Human, All Too Human, philosopher Friedrich Nietzsche suggested that those who refrain from lying may do so only because of the difficulty involved in maintaining lies. This is consistent with his general philosophy that divides (or ranks) people according to strength and ability; thus, some people tell the truth only out of weakness.

A study was conducted by the University of Nottingham, released in 2016, which utilized a dice roll test where participants could easily lie to get a bigger payout. The study found that in countries with high prevalence of rule breaking, dishonesty in people in their early 20s was more prevalent.

== Great apes and mother birds ==
Possession of the capacity to lie among non-humans has been asserted during language studies with great apes. In one instance, the gorilla Koko, when asked who tore a sink from the wall, pointed to one of her handlers and then laughed.

Deceptive body language, such as feints that mislead as to the intended direction of attack or flight, is observed in many species. A mother bird deceives when she pretends to have a broken wing to divert the attention of a perceived predator – including unwitting humans – from the eggs in her nest, instead to her, as she draws the predator away from the location of the nest, most notably a trait of the killdeer.

== Cultural references ==
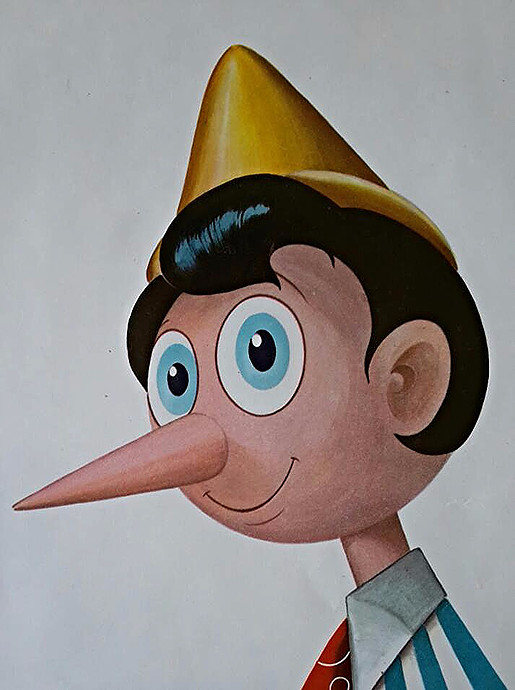
Pinocchio, a symbol of untruthfulness

- Carlo Collodi's Pinocchio is a wooden puppet character often led into trouble by his propensity to lie; his nose grows with every one. Hence, long noses have become a caricature of liars.
- The Boy Who Cried Wolf, a fable attributed to Aesop about a boy who continually lies that a wolf is coming. When a wolf does appear, nobody believes him anymore.
- A famous anecdote by Parson Weems claims that George Washington once cut at a cherry tree with a hatchet when he was a small child. His father asked him who cut the cherry tree and Washington confessed his crime with the words: "I'm sorry, father, I cannot tell a lie."
- To Tell the Truth was the originator of a genre of game shows with three contestants claiming to be a person only one of them is.
- Glenn Kessler, a journalist at The Washington Post, awards one to four Pinocchios to politicians in his Washington Post Fact Checker blog.
- Sun Tzu declared that "All warfare is based on deception."
- Machiavelli advised in The Prince that a prince must become a "great feigner and dissembler."
- Thomas Hobbes wrote in Leviathan: "In war, force and fraud are the two cardinal virtues."
- The concept of a memory hole was first popularized by George Orwell's dystopian novel, Nineteen Eighty-Four, where the Party's Ministry of Truth systematically re-created all potential historical documents, in effect re-writing all of history to match the often-changing state propaganda. These changes were complete and undetectable.
- In the film Big Fat Liar, the story producer Marty Wolf (a notorious and proud liar) steals a story from student Jason Shepard, telling of a character whose lies become out of control to the point where each lie he tells causes him to grow in size.
- In the film Liar Liar, the lawyer Fletcher Reede (Jim Carrey) cannot lie for 24 hours, due to a wish of his son that magically came true.
- In the 1985 film Max Headroom, the title character comments that one can always tell when a politician lies because "their lips move". The joke has been widely repeated and rephrased.
- Lie to Me is a television series based on behavior analysts who read lies through facial expressions and body language.
- The Invention of Lying is a 2009 movie depicting the fictitious invention of the first lie, starring Ricky Gervais, Jennifer Garner, Rob Lowe, and Tina Fey.
- The Adventures of Baron Munchausen tell the story about an eighteenth-century baron who tells outrageous, unbelievable stories, all of which he claims are true.

== Religious perspectives ==
=== In the Bible ===
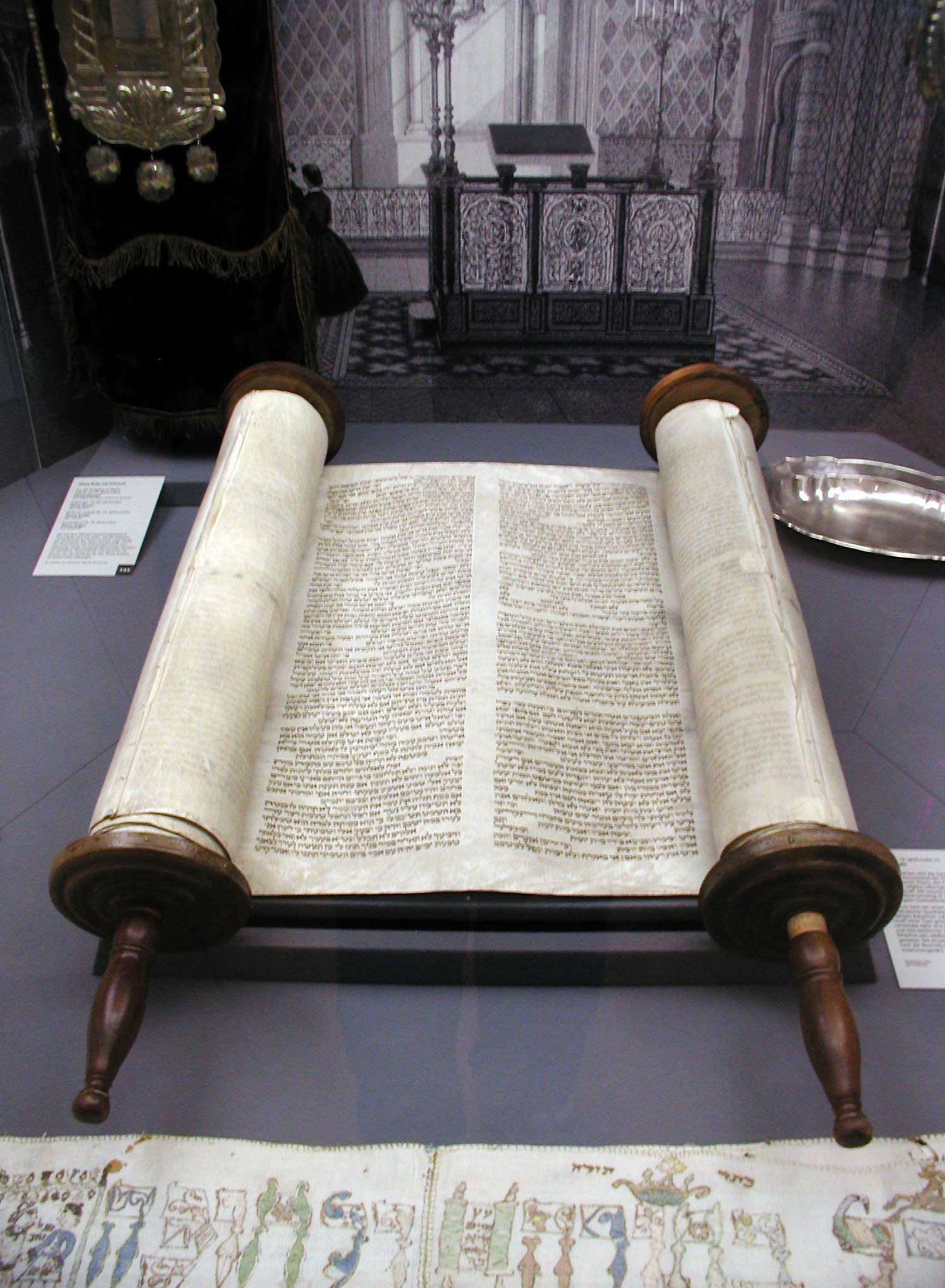
A Torah scroll recovered from Glockengasse Synagogue in Cologne

The Old Testament and New Testament of the Bible both contain statements that God cannot lie and that lying is immoral (Num. 23:19, Hab. 2:3, Heb. 6:13–18). Nevertheless, there are examples of God deliberately causing enemies to become disorientated and confused, in order to provide victory (2 Thess. 2:11; 1 Kings 22:23; Ezek. 14:9).

Various passages of the Bible feature exchanges that assert lying is immoral and wrong (Prov. 6:16–19; Ps. 5:6), (Lev. 19:11; Prov. 14:5; Prov. 30:6; Zeph. 3:13), (Isa. 28:15; Dan. 11:27), most famously, in the Ten Commandments: "Thou shalt not bear false witness" (Ex. 20:2–17; Deut. 5:6–21); Ex. 23:1; Matt. 19:18; Mark 10:19; Luke 18:20 a specific reference to perjury.

Other passages feature descriptive (not prescriptive) exchanges where lying was committed in extreme circumstances involving life and death. Most Christian philosophers might argue that lying is never acceptable, but that even those who are righteous in God's eyes sin sometimes. Old Testament accounts of lying include:

- The midwives lied about their inability to kill the Israelite children. (Ex. 1:15–21).
- Rahab lied to the king of Jericho about hiding the Hebrew spies (Josh. 2:4–5) and was not killed with those who were disobedient because of her faith (Heb. 11:31).
- Abraham instructed his wife, Sarah, to mislead the Egyptians and say that she is his sister (Gen. 12:10). Abraham's story was strictly true – Sarah was his half sister – but intentionally misleading because it was designed to lead the Egyptians to believe that Sarah was not Abraham's wife for Abraham feared that they would kill him in order to take her, for she was very beautiful.

In the New Testament, Jesus refers to the Devil as the father of lies (John 8:44) and Paul commands Christians "Do not lie to one another" (Col. 3:9; cf. Lev. 19:11). In the Day of Judgement, unrepentant liars will be punished in the lake of fire. (Rev. 21:8; 21:27).

=== Augustine's taxonomy ===
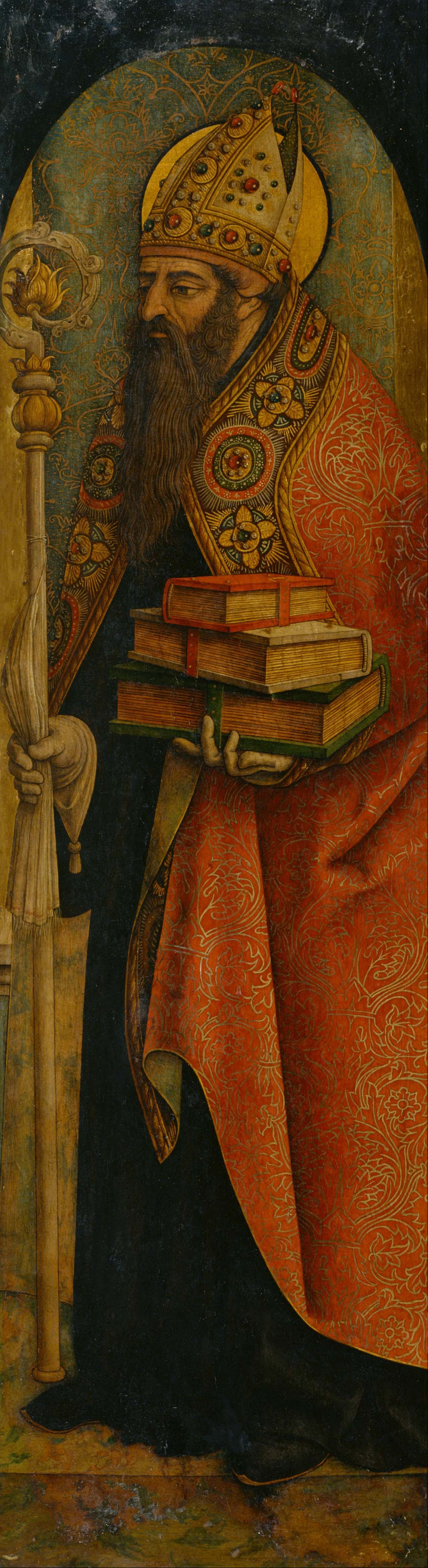
St. Augustine by Carlo Crivelli

Augustine of Hippo wrote two books about lying: On Lying (De Mendacio) and Against Lying (Contra Mendacio). He describes each book in his later work, Retractationes. Based on the location of De Mendacio in Retractationes, it appears to have been written about AD 395. The first work, On Lying, begins: "Magna quæstio est de Mendacio" ("There is a great question about Lying"). From his text, it can be derived that St. Augustine divided lies into eight categories, listed in order of descending severity:

- Lies in religious teaching
- Lies that harm others and help no one
- Lies that harm others and help someone
- Lies told for the pleasure of lying
- Lies told to "please others in smooth discourse"
- Lies that harm no one and that help someone materially
- Lies that harm no one and that help someone spiritually
- Lies that harm no one and that protect someone from "bodily defilement"

Despite distinguishing between lies according to their external severity, Augustine maintains in both treatises that all lies, defined precisely as the external communication of what one does not hold to be internally true, are categorically sinful and therefore, ethically impermissible.

Augustine wrote that lies told in jest, or by someone who believes or opines the lie to be true are not, in fact, lies.

=== In Buddhism ===
The fourth of the five Buddhist precepts involves falsehood spoken or committed to by action. Avoiding other forms of wrong speech are also considered part of this precept, consisting of malicious speech, harsh speech, and gossip. A breach of the precept is considered more serious if the falsehood is motivated by an ulterior motive (rather than, for example, "a small white lie"). The accompanying virtue is being honest and dependable, and involves honesty in work, truthfulness to others, loyalty to superiors, and gratitude to benefactors. In Buddhist texts, this precept is considered most important next to the first precept, because a lying person is regarded to have no shame, and therefore capable of many wrongs. Lying is not only to be avoided because it harms others, but also because it goes against the Buddhist ideal of finding the truth.

The fourth precept includes avoidance of lying and harmful speech. Some modern Buddhist teachers such as Thich Nhat Hanh interpret this to include avoiding spreading false news and uncertain information. Work that involves data manipulation, false advertising, or online scams can also be regarded as violations. Anthropologist Barend Terwiel reports that among Thai Buddhists, the fourth precept also is seen to be broken when people insinuate, exaggerate, or speak abusively or deceitfully.

=== In Norse paganism ===
In Gestaþáttr, one of the sections within the Eddaic poem Hávamál, Odin states that it is advisable, when dealing with "a false foe who lies", to tell lies also.

=== In ancient Persia ===
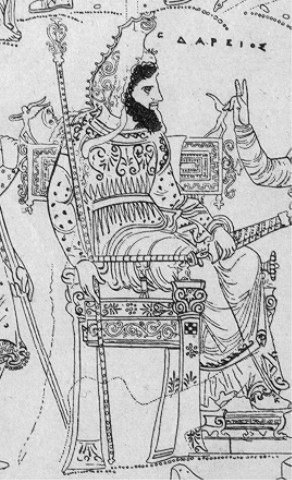
Darius I, imagined by a Greek painter, fourth century BCE

Zoroaster teaches that there are two powers in the universe; Asha, which is truth, order, and that which is real, and Druj, which is "the Lie". Later on, the Lie became personified as Angra Mainyu, a figure similar to the Christian Devil, who was portrayed as the eternal opponent of Ahura Mazda (God).

Herodotus, in his mid-fifth-century BC account of Persian residents of the Pontus, reports that Persian youths, from their fifth year to their twentieth year, were instructed in three things – "to ride a horse, to draw a bow, and to speak the Truth". He further notes that: "The most disgraceful thing in the world [the Persians] think, is to tell a lie; the next worst, to owe a debt: because, among other reasons, the debtor is obliged to tell lies."

In Achaemenid Persia, the lie, drauga (in Avestan: druj), is considered to be a cardinal sin and it was punishable by death in some extreme cases. Tablets discovered by archaeologists in the 1930s at the site of Persepolis give us adequate evidence about the love and veneration for the culture of truth during the Achaemenian period. These tablets contain the names of ordinary Persians, mainly traders and warehouse-keepers. According to Stanley Insler of Yale University, as many as 72 names of officials and petty clerks found on these tablets contain the word truth. Thus, says Insler, we have Artapana, protector of truth, Artakama, lover of truth, Artamanah, truth-minded, Artafarnah, possessing splendour of truth, Artazusta, delighting in truth, Artastuna, pillar of truth, Artafrida, prospering the truth, and Artahunara, having nobility of truth.

It was Darius the Great who laid down the "ordinance of good regulations" during his reign. Darius' testimony about his constant battle against the Lie is found in the Behistun Inscription. He testifies: "I was not a lie-follower, I was not a doer of wrong ... According to righteousness I conducted myself. Neither to the weak or to the powerful did I do wrong. The man who cooperated with my house, him I rewarded well; who so did injury, him I punished well."

He asks Ahuramazda, God, to protect the country from "a (hostile) army, from famine, from the Lie".

Darius had his hands full dealing with large-scale rebellion which broke out throughout the empire. After fighting successfully with nine traitors in a year, Darius records his battles against them for posterity and tells us how it was the Lie that made them rebel against the empire. At the Behistun inscription, Darius says: "I smote them and took prisoner nine kings. One was Gaumata by name, a Magian; he lied; thus he said: I am Smerdis, the son of Cyrus ... One, Acina by name, an Elamite; he lied; thus he said: I am king in Elam ... One, Nidintu-Bel by name, a Babylonian; he lied; thus he said: I am Nebuchadnezzar, the son of Nabonidus. ... The Lie made them rebellious, so that these men deceived the people." Then advice to his son Xerxes, who is to succeed him as the great king: "Thou who shalt be king hereafter, protect yourself vigorously from the Lie; the man who shall be a lie-follower, him do thou punish well, if thus thou shall think. May my country be secure!"

== See also ==
- Appeal to emotion
- Big Lie
- Black propaganda
- Fabrication (science)
- False analogy
- False equivalence
- False or misleading statements by Donald Trump
- Knowledge falsification
- Mental reservation
- Plausible deniability
- Post-truth politics
- Preference falsification
- Prisoner's dilemma
- Psychological manipulation
- Self-deception or self-delusion
- Sophistry
- Spin (public relations)

== General and cited sources ==
- Harvey, Peter (2000). An Introduction to Buddhist Ethics: Foundations, Values and Issues (PDF). Cambridge University Press. ISBN 978-0-511-07584-1. Archived from the original (PDF) on 12 April 2019.
- Wai, Maurice Nyunt (2002). Pañcasila and Catholic Moral Teaching: Moral Principles as Expression of Spiritual Experience in Theravada Buddhism and Christianity. Gregorian Biblical BookShop. ISBN 978-88-7652-920-7.
