= Porker =

Porker may refer to:

- Pig
- An obese person
- Porsche motor cars, sometimes known as Porkers
- A lie, known by the slang term porkie pie or porker
- A colloquial term for a great white shark
