= Upaya =

Buddhist term

Translations of Upaya
- Sanskrit: उपाय
- Chinese: 方便 (Pinyin: fāngbiàn)
- Japanese: 方便 (Rōmaji: hōben)
- Tibetan: ཐབས (thabs)
- Vietnamese: phương tiện upaya-kaushalya: phương tiện thiện xảo

In Buddhism, upaya (Sanskrit: उपाय, upāya, expedient means, pedagogy) is an aspect of guidance along paths of moksha or liberation, where a conscious, voluntary action "is driven by an incomplete reasoning" about its direction. Upaya is often used with kaushalya (कौशल्य, "cleverness"), upaya-kaushalya meaning "skill in means". In the Shantiparva of the Mahabharata, Bhishma says that moksha is only through upaya (e.g., 12266001).

Upaya-kaushalya is a concept emphasizing that practitioners may use their own specific methods or techniques that fit the situation in order to gain enlightenment. The implication is that even if a technique, view, etc., is not ultimately "true" in the highest sense, it may still be an expedient practice to perform or view to hold; i.e., it may bring the practitioner closer to the true realization in a similar way. The exercise of skill to which it refers, the ability to adapt one's message to the audience, is of enormous importance in the Pali Canon.

The Digital Dictionary of Buddhism notes that rendering the Chinese term fāngbiàn into English as 'skillful' or as 'expedient' is often difficult, because the connotations shift according to the context as (1) the teaching being something to marvel at — the fact that the Buddha can present these difficult truths in everyday language (thus, skillful), yet that (2) they are teachings of a lower order as compared to the ultimate truth, and are far removed from reflecting reality, and are a kind of 'stopgap' measure (thus, expedient).

== Role and function of Upaya ==
One consequence of this is that it is possible to endorse a form of Buddhist practice as viable while simultaneously critiquing its premises or contrasting it unfavorably to another, higher practice. In some Mahayana texts, such as the Lotus Sutra, this is used as a polemic device against prior Buddhist traditions; it is said that the Buddha gave them various upayas rather than revealing the ultimate truth, for which they were not ready.

Gregory frames the hermeneutical classification of Buddhist schools (Chinese pànjiào 判教 "doctrinal classification") as an "expedient means:"

The doctrine of expedient means provided the main hermeneutical device by which Chinese Buddhists systematically ordered the Buddha's teachings in their classificatory schemes. It enabled them to arrange the teachings in such a way that each teaching served as an expedient measure to overcome the particular shortcoming of the teaching that preceded it while, at the same time, pointing to the teaching that was to supersede it. In this fashion a hierarchical progression of teachings could be constructed, starting with the most elementary and leading to the most profound.

The most important concept in skill in means is the use, guided by wisdom and compassion, of a specific teaching (means) geared to the particular audience taught. Edward Conze, in A Short History Of Buddhism, says "'Skill in means' is the ability to bring out the spiritual potentialities of different people by statements or actions which are adjusted to their needs and adapted to their capacity for comprehension."

The concept of skillfulness is prominent in Mahayana Buddhism with regards to the actions of a bodhisattva. The idea is that a bodhisattva or practitioner may use any expedient methods in order to help ease the suffering of people, introduce them to the dharma, or help them on their road to nirvana. In chapter 25 of the Lotus Sutra, the Buddha describes how the Bodhisattva Avalokitesvara changes his form to meet the needs of the student. If a monk is needed, the Bodhisattva becomes a monk for example.

This doctrine is sometimes used to explain some of the otherwise strange or unorthodox behavior or 'crazy wisdom' (Tib.: yeshe chölwa) engaged in by some Buddhists and exemplified in the conduct of the Tibetan Mahasiddha. Skillful means may theoretically be used by different buddhist groups to make many seemingly proscribed practices, such as violence, theft, and sexuality be employed as skillful. The use of harsh violence to one's disciples has occasionally been used as a way of opening their eyes to the nature of self and suffering; an example is the story of a Zen priest who ended a conversation with a disciple by slamming shut a door on the disciple's leg, fracturing the leg and, according to the story, causing a deep insight in the disciple. There are a number of other stories of Buddhist saints and bodhisattvas taking part in fairly eccentric and unusual behaviors in the practice of skillful means.

The practices and rituals of Vajrayana Buddhism are also often interpreted as a process of skillful means. They are understood to be means whereby practitioners use the very misconceptions and properties of mundane existence to help themselves reach enlightenment.

== Images and examples ==
Buddhist texts metaphorically explain the upaya concept through illustrations such as a burning house and an empty fist.

=== Parable of the burning house ===
The Lotus Sutra contains a famous upaya story about using the expedient means of white lies to rescue children from a burning building. Note that this parable describes three yana "vehicles; carts" drawn by goats, deer, and oxen, which is a Mahayanist wordplay upon classifying the Sutrayana Schools of Buddhism into the Hearer's Vehicle (Sravakayana), Solitary Conqueror's Vehicle (Pratyekabuddhayana), and the Great Vehicle (Mahayana).

Gautama Buddha elucidates upaya to his disciple Shariputra.

"Shariputra, suppose that in a certain town in a certain country there was a very rich man. He was far along in years and his wealth was beyond measure. He had many fields, houses and menservants. His own house was big and rambling, but it had only one gate. A great many people—a hundred, two hundred, perhaps as many as five hundred—lived in the house. The halls and rooms were old and decaying, the walls crumbling, the pillars rotten at their base, and the beams and rafters crooked and aslant. At that time a fire suddenly broke out on all sides, spreading through the rooms of the house. The sons of the rich man, ten, twenty perhaps thirty, were inside the house. When the rich man saw the huge flames leaping up on every side, he was greatly alarmed and fearful and thought to himself, I can escape to safety through the flaming gate, but my sons are inside the burning house enjoying themselves and playing games, unaware, unknowing, without alarm or fear. The fire is closing in on them, suffering and pain threaten them, yet their minds have no sense of loathing or peril and they do not think of trying to escape!

"Shariputra, this rich man thought to himself, I have strength in my body and arms. I can wrap them in a robe or place them on a bench and carry them out of the house. And then again he thought, this house has only one gate, and moreover it is narrow and small. My sons are very young, they have no understanding, and they love their games, being so engrossed in them that they are likely to be burned in the fire. I must explain to them why I am fearful and alarmed. The house is already in flames and I must get them out quickly and not let them be burned up in the fire! Having thought in this way, he followed his plan and called to all his sons, saying, 'You must come out at once!" But though the father was moved by pity and gave good words of instruction, the sons were absorbed in their games and unwilling to heed them. They had no alarm, no fright, and in the end no mind to leave the house. Moreover, they did not understand what the fire was, what the house was, what the danger was. They merely raced about this way and that in play and looked at their father without heeding him.

"At that time the rich man had this thought: the house is already in flames from this huge fire. If I and my sons do not get out at once, we are certain to be burned. I must now invent some expedient means that will make it possible for the children to escape harm. The father understood his sons and knew what various toys and curious objects each child customarily liked and what would delight them. And so he said to them, 'The kind of playthings you like are rare and hard to find. If you do not take them when you can, you will surely regret it later. For example, things like these goat-carts, deer-carts and ox-carts. They are outside the gate now where you can play with them. So you must come out of this burning house at once. Then whatever ones you want, I will give them all to you!' "At that time, when the sons heard their father telling them about these rare playthings, because such things were just what they had wanted, each felt emboldened in heart and, pushing and shoving one another, they all came wildly dashing out of the burning house.

The father subsequently presents each of his sons with a large bejeweled carriage drawn by a pure white ox. When the Buddha asks Shariputra whether the father was guilty of falsehood, he answers.

"No, World-Honored One. This rich man simply made it possible for his sons to escape the peril of fire and preserve their lives. He did not commit a falsehood. Why do I say this? Because if they were able to preserve their lives, then they had already obtained a plaything of sorts. And how much more so when, through an expedient means, they are rescued from that burning house!"

The Buddha explains his similes of the father representing a compassionate Tathāgata who is like "a father to all the world", and the sons representing humans who are "born into the threefold world, a burning house, rotten, and old".

"Shariputra, that rich man first used three types of carriages to entice his sons, but later he gave them just the large carriage adorned with jewels, the safest, most comfortable kind of all. Despite this, that rich man was not guilty of falsehood. The Tathagata does the same, and he is without falsehood. First he preaches the three vehicles to attract and guide living beings, but later he employs just the Great Vehicle to save them. Why? The Tathagata possesses measureless wisdom, power, freedom from fear, the storehouse of the Dharma. He is capable of giving to all living beings the Dharma of the Great Vehicle. But not all of them are capable of receiving it. Shariputra, for this reason you should understand that the Buddhas employ the power of expedient means. And because they do so, they make distinctions in the one Buddha vehicle and preach it as three."

=== The empty fist ===
Another common metaphor for upaya is that of "the empty fist". A father holds up his empty fist saying there is something inside it to get the attention of the crying children. Sometimes the fist is holding golden leaves to give the impression that something made of gold is held inside. This is a favorite image of Zen teachers as it eloquently expresses in image the reason behind the necessity for upaya, that is, sunyata, all component things are empty. From the Zen point of view an essential teaching of Buddhism is that all assertions of any kind, even the highest concepts of Buddhism itself such as the Trikaya, are simply expedient means to bring the hearer to the realization of emptiness. But because many people are afraid of emptiness or disdain the idea of emptiness, various upaya must be used to get the student's attention to focus on the essence of mind rather than upon the distractions of mind. Here's an example from the Record of Zen master Linji Yixuan:

One asked: "What is the realm of the Three Eyes?" The master said: "I enter with you the realm of utter purity, wear the robe of purity and expound the Dharmakaya Buddha. Or we enter the realm of non-differentiation and expound the Sambhogakaya Buddha. Or again, we enter the realm of deliverance, wear the robe of radiance and speak of the Nirmanakaya Buddha. The realms of the Three Eyes depend on change. To explain it from the point of the Sutras and Treatises, the Dharmakaya is the fundamental. The Sambhogakaya and the Nirmanakaya are the functions. But as I see it, the Dharmakaya cannot expound (or comprehend) the Dharma. Thus an old master said: "The (Buddha's) bodies are set up with reference to meaning; The (Buddha's) realms are differentiated with reference to the bodies." The nature of the bodies and of the realms is clear; they are the temple of the Dharma, and so are only relative. "Yellow leaves in the empty fist to entice unweaned children." Spikes of water-chestnuts — what juice are you looking for in those dry bones? There is no Dharma outside the heart [i.e., mind], nor anything to find inside. So what are you looking for?

== In the Pali Canon ==
According to Richard Gombrich:

"It is true that the term translated 'expounding in means', upaya-kausalya, is post-canonical, but the exercise of expounding to which it refers, the ability to adapt one's message to the audience, is of enormous importance in the Pali Canon."

The Pāli term upāya-kosalla does occur in the Pāli Canon, in the Sangiti Sutta of the Digha Nikāya.

== Contemporary mindfulness-based interventions and upaya ==
The recent rise of mindfulness-based interventions has led to debates as to just how much these short-termed programs convey the essence of the Buddhist path. On the one hand, scholars like Jon Kabat-Zinn can be viewed as having secularized the practice and hence having made it accessible to a population who would never think of trying it had it been rendered in Buddhist terms. On the other hand, critics such as Glenn Wallis, Ron Purser, David Loy and others have strongly rejected the mindfulness movement in the ways that it has become a commercialized version of the practice. Mindfulness-based interventions in schools and educational institutions have also been discussed within these contexts. Some argue that these programs must be grounded in the origins of the practice's ethics.

== See also ==
- Mindstream
- Prajna
- Trikaya
- Lie-to-children
