= Dysrationalia =

Inability to think and behave rationally despite adequate intelligence

Dysrationalia is defined as the inability to think and behave rationally despite adequate intelligence. It is a concept in educational psychology and is not a clinical disorder such as a thought disorder. Dysrationalia can be a resource to help explain why smart people fall for Ponzi schemes and other fraudulent encounters.

== History ==
The concept of dysrationalia was first proposed by psychologist Keith Stanovich in the early 1990s. Stanovich originally classified dysrationalia as a learning disability and characterized it as a difficulty in belief formation, in assessing belief consistency, or in the determination of action to achieve one's goals. However, special education researcher Kenneth Kavale noted that dysrationalia may be more aptly categorized as a thinking disorder, rather than a learning disability, because it does not have a direct impact upon academic performance.

Psychologist Robert Sternberg argued that the construct of dysrationalia needed to be better conceptualized since it lacked a theoretical framework (explaining why people are dysrational and how they become this way) and operationalization (how dysrationalia could be measured). Sternberg also noted that the concept had the potential for misuse, as one may label another as dysrational simply because he or she does not agree with the other person's view: "I am afraid that Stanovich has fallen into a trap—that of labeling people as 'dysrational' who have beliefs that he does not accept. And therein lies frightening potential for misuse."

Stanovich then replied to both Kavale and Sternberg. In response to Sternberg's concern about the construct's potential for misuse, Stanovich said that in that respect it is no different from other constructs such as intelligence, which is a construct that Sternberg himself uses. Stanovich emphasized that use of the dysrationalia construct should be carefully based on rigorous standards of epistemic justification that do not depend solely on social agreement or disagreement and that refer to the process of justifying beliefs, not to the content of beliefs themselves. Stanovich and his colleagues further developed the theoretical framework for, and operationalization of, dysrationalia in later books.

In 2002 Sternberg edited a book, Why Smart People Can Be So Stupid, in which the dysrationalia concept was extensively discussed. In his 2009 book What Intelligence Tests Miss, Stanovich provided the detailed conceptualization that Sternberg called for in his earlier critique. In that book, Stanovich showed that variation in rational thinking skills is surprisingly independent of intelligence. One implication of this finding is that dysrationalia should not be rare.

== Mindware ==
Stanovich proposed two concepts related to dysrationalia: mindware gap and contaminated mindware.

A mindware gap results from gaps in education and experience. This idea focuses on the lack or limitations within a person's knowledge in logic, probability theory, or scientific method when it comes to belief orientation or decision-making. Due to these gaps, intelligent people can make seemingly irrational decisions.

Contaminated mindware focuses on how intelligent people believe irrational ideologies, conspiracy theories, pseudosciences, and/or get-rich-quick schemes. A person can be led into such contaminated mindware through heuristic trust or fallacious reasoning.

== Examples ==
One example that Stanovich related to dysrationalia centers on two former Illinois schoolteachers who pulled their children from the local public school in the area because discussions of the Holocaust are a part of the school's history curriculum. These parents, who are presumably competent due to their college education, believe that the Holocaust is a myth and should not be taught to their children. This is an example of a problem in belief formation regardless of intelligence.

A survey was given to Canadian Mensa club members on the topic of paranormal belief. Mensa members are provided membership strictly because of their high-IQ scores. The survey results showed that 44% of the members believed in astrology, 51% believed in biorhythms, and 56% believed in the existence of extraterrestrial visitors. Stanovich argued that these beliefs have no valid evidence and thus might have been an example of dysrationalia. Sternberg countered that "No one has yet conclusively proven any of these beliefs to be false", so endorsement of the beliefs should not be considered evidence of dysrationalia. Stanovich's rebuttal to Sternberg explained that the purpose of the example was to question the epistemic rationality of the process by which people arrived at their unlikely conclusions, a process of evaluating the quality of arguments and evidence for and against each conclusion, not to assume irrationality based on the content of the conclusion alone.

There are many examples of people who are famous because of their intelligence, but often display irrational behavior. Two examples cited by Stanovich were Martin Heidegger and William Crookes. Heidegger, a renowned philosopher, was also a Nazi apologist and "used the most specious of arguments to justify his beliefs". Crookes, a famous scientist who discovered the element thallium and was a Fellow of the Royal Society, "was repeatedly duped by spiritualist 'mediums' but never gave up his belief in spiritualism". Science journalist David Robson cited the example of Kary Mullis, an American biochemist and 1993 Nobel Prize winner who was also an astrology supporter and a climate change and HIV/AIDS denier.

== See also ==
- Argumentation theory – Academic field of logic and rhetoric
- Bounded rationality – Making of satisfactory, not optimal, decisions
- Cognitive development – Field of study in neuroscience and psychology
- Cognitive miser – Psychological problem-solving tendency
- Concept inventory – Knowledge assessment tool
- Double-loop learning – Learning model
- Dyscalculia – Disorder affecting learning arithmetic
- Dyslexia – Learning disability affecting reading
- Dysthymia – Psychiatric disorder defined by chronic depression
- Educational assessment – Educational evaluation method
- Great Rationality Debate – Quality of being agreeable to reason
- Ignorance – Lack of knowledge and understanding
- In Over Our Heads – Book on psychological development by Robert Kegan
- Illogicality – Fundamental concepts in philosophy
- Instructional scaffolding – Support given to a student by an instructor
- Irrationality – Thinking, talking, or acting without inclusion of rationality
- Neurathian bootstrap – Philosophical analogy about knowledge
- Predictably Irrational – 2008 book by Dan Ariely
- Reflective equilibrium – State of balance among a set of beliefs, arrived at by considering general principles
- Stupidity – Lack of intelligence
