= Noble lie =

Untruth propagated to strengthen social harmony

The concept of a noble lie (also known as useful fiction) is a myth or a lie that is prevalent in a society, and that either emerges on its own or is propagated by an elite in order to maintain social order or for the "greater good". It is argued by some to be an example of the psychological concept of groupthink.

Descriptions of it and application of terminology to it, date back as early as ancient Greece in Plato's The Republic.

== History and philosophy ==
=== Plato ===
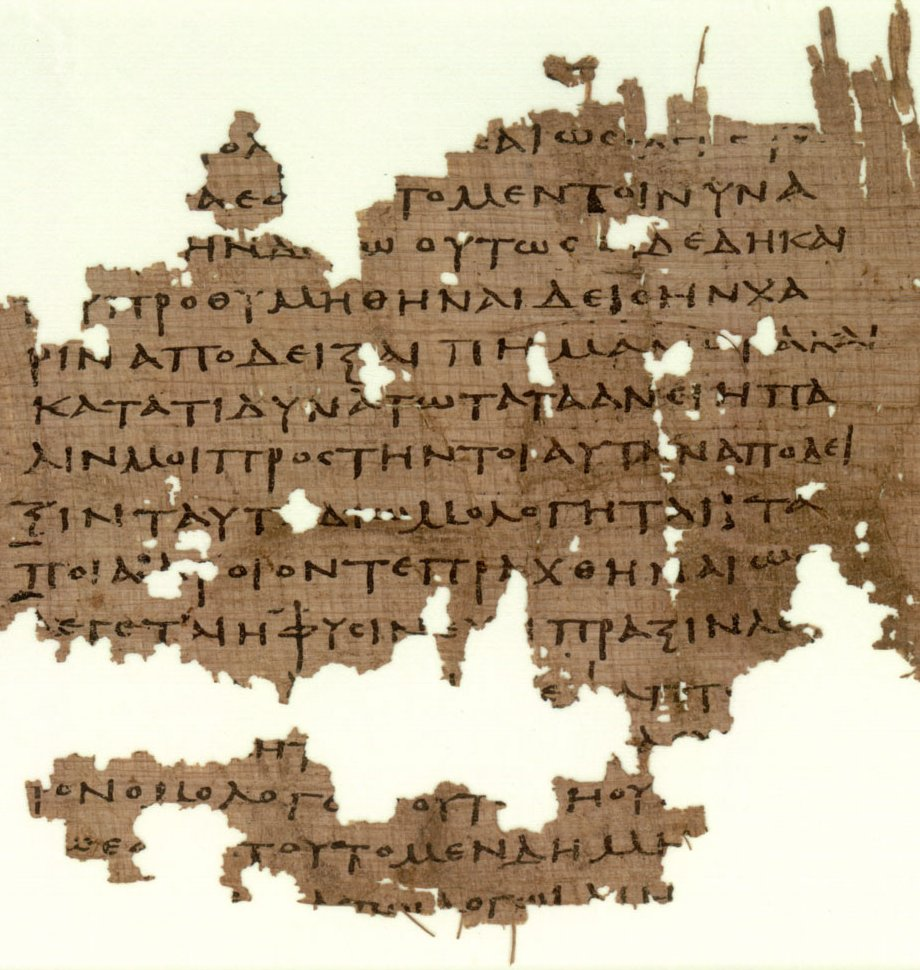
P. Oxy. 3679, a manuscript from the 3rd century AD, containing fragments of Plato's Republic

In his political philosophy work The Republic, Plato presented the noble lie (γενναῖον ψεῦδος, gennaion pseudos) in the fictional tale known as the myth or parable of the metals in Book III. In it, Socrates provides the origin of the three social classes who compose the republic proposed by Plato. Socrates proposes and claims that if the people believed "this myth...[it] would have a good effect, making them more inclined to care for the state and one another."

[Y]et God in fashioning those of you who are fitted to hold rule mingled gold in their generation, for which reason they are the most precious—but in the helpers silver, and iron and brass in the farmers and other craftsmen. (...) and if sons are born to them with an infusion of brass or iron they shall by no means give way to pity in their treatment of them, but shall assign to each the status due to his nature and thrust them out among the artisans or the farmers. And again, if from these there is born a son with unexpected gold or silver in his composition they shall honor such and bid them go up higher, some to the office of guardian, some to the assistanceship, alleging that there is an oracle that the state shall then be overthrown when the man of iron or brass is its guardian.

— Plato, Republic Book III 415a–415c

In Republic Book III, 415a–417b, Plato (or Socrates within the dialogue) seeks not merely to justify the social hierarchy through the "noble lie", but also to devise a means of preventing intensified hostility between classes and harmoniously binding different strata together, by ensuring that each class exchanges its shares and roles and that these are distributed in a balanced way.

In Plato's Republic, the “gold of the soul” does not refer to an actual metal, but rather to the nobility residing within the guardian’s inner nature. By contrast, the “gold of the earth” signifies material wealth, portrayed as a source of envy, greed, intrigue, and corruption. Accordingly, he argues that the ruling and producing classes must possess different qualifications. The ruling class, endowed with the virtues likened to “gold and silver” in the soul, should therefore be excluded from the economic qualification to accumulate worldly wealth. The producing class, by contrast, possesses a temperament likened to “bronze” and thus may form and exchange wealth and property, but must be barred from participation in politics. In his view, the ruling and producing classes should exchange the two types of qualifications—political authority and economic power. Once these two domains are intermixed, the community’s misfortune and injustice inevitably begin:

But whenever they shall acquire for themselves land of their own and houses and coin, they will be house-holders and farmers instead of guardians, and will be transformed from the helpers of their fellow citizens to their enemies and masters, and so in hating and being hated, plotting and being plotted against they will pass their days fearing far more and rather the townsmen within than the foemen without – and then even then laying the course of near shipwreck for themselves and the state.

— Plato, Republic Book III 417a–417b

Tarnopolsky argues that Plato’s "noble lie" is not authoritarian propaganda but a self-conscious civic rhetorical device that tests and educates its audience by fostering critical suspicion toward founding myths.

==== Criticism ====
The concept of the noble lie as defined by Plato has sparked controversy among modern interpreters. Although some earlier classical scholars including Francis Cornford argued that "noble lie" was a mistranslation, Allan Bloom argued for a literal translation and interpretation of Plato's expression.

In The Open Society and Its Enemies, Karl Popper remarks, "It is hard to understand why those of Plato's commentators who praise him for fighting against the subversive conventionalism of the Sophists, and for establishing a spiritual naturalism ultimately based on religion, fail to censure him for making a convention, or rather an invention, the ultimate basis of religion." Religion for Plato is a noble lie, at least if we assume that Plato meant all of this sincerely, not cynically. Popper finds Plato's conception of religion to have been very influential in subsequent thought.

Leo Strauss noted that thinkers of the first rank, going back to Plato, had raised the problem of whether good and effective politicians could be completely truthful and still achieve the necessary ends of their society. In The City and Man, Strauss discusses the myths outlined in Plato's Republic that are required for all governments. These include a belief that the state's land belongs to it even though it was likely acquired illegitimately and that citizenship is rooted in something more than the accidents of birth. By implication, Strauss asks his readers to consider whether it is true that noble lies have no role at all to play in uniting and guiding the polis. He questions whether myths are needed to give people meaning and purpose and whether they ensure a stable society in contrast to the more skeptical attitude which posits that men dedicated to the relentless examination of, in Nietzschean language, "deadly truths" can flourish freely, all the while concluding with an inquiry into whether there can be a limit to the political and epistemic absolutes.

== See also ==
- Argumentum ad populum
- Bandwagon effect
- Bokononism
- Big lie – Propaganda technique
- Consensus theory of truth
- Lie-to-children
- Morality play
- Paternalistic deception
- Social dominance theory
- Social dominance orientation
- Collective Illusions (book)
- Pious fiction
- Pious fraud
- Plato's Laws
- Shendao teachings
- White lie
- The Grand Inquisitor
