= Lie-to-children =

Teaching a complex subject via simpler models

A lie-to-children is a simplified, and often technically incorrect, explanation of technical or complex subjects employed as a teaching method. It is usually not done with an intent to deceive, but instead seek to 'meet the child/pupil/student where they are', in order to facilitate initial comprehension, which they build upon over time as the learner's intellectual capacity expands. The technique has been incorporated by academics within the fields of biology, evolution, bioinformatics and the social sciences.

== Origin and development ==
The Science of Discworld authors

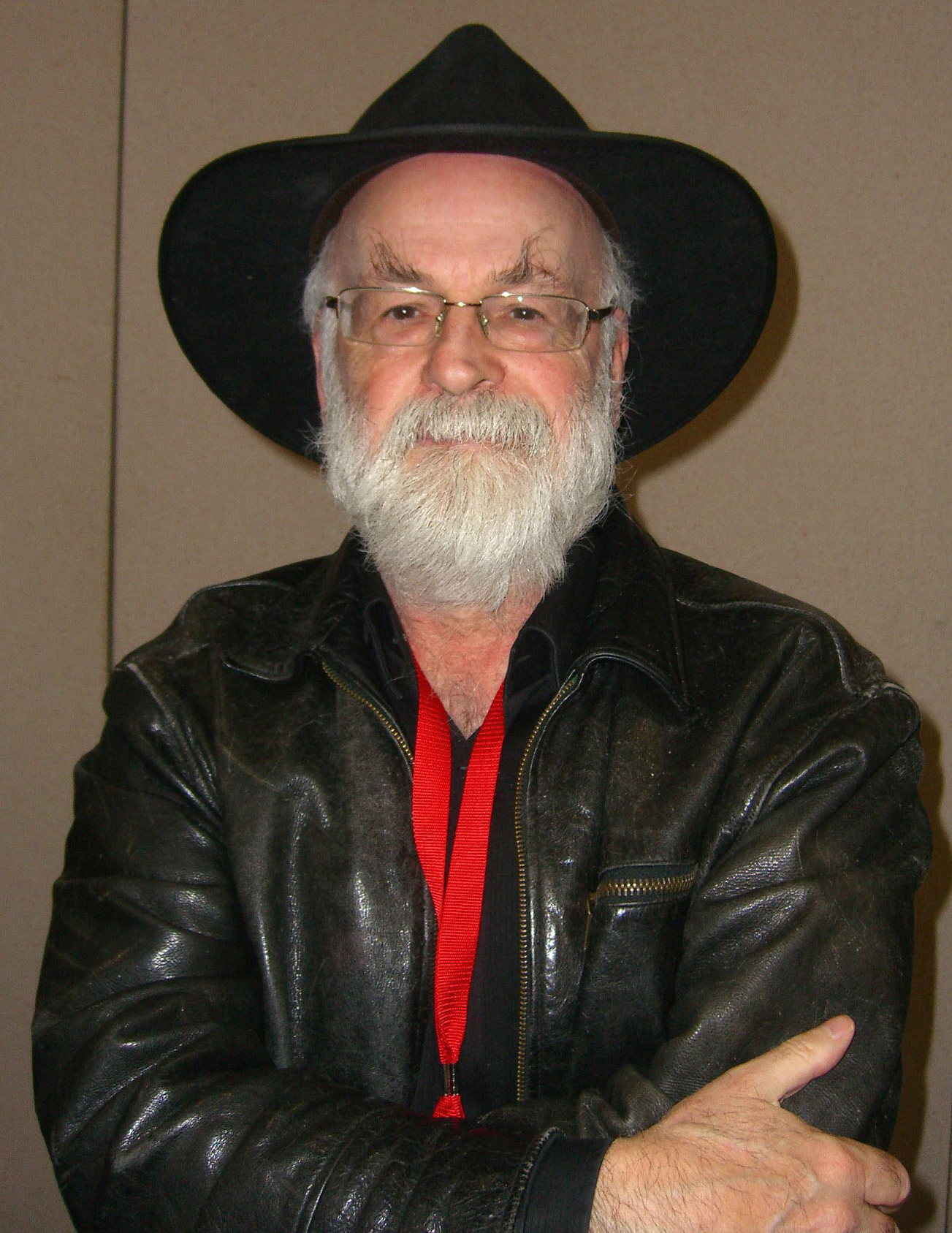
Terry Pratchett

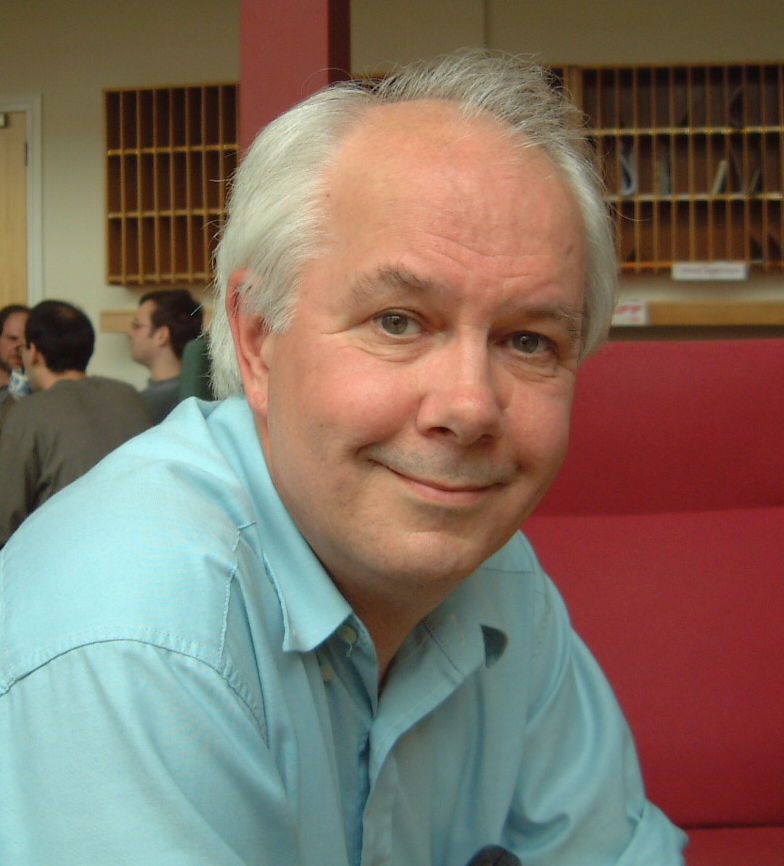
Ian Stewart

Two of the three authors of The Science of Discworld

The "lie-to-children" concept was first discussed by scientist Jack Cohen and mathematician Ian Stewart in the 1994 book The Collapse of Chaos: Discovering Simplicity in a Complex World as myths—a means of ensuring that accumulated cultural lore is passed on to future generations in a way that was sufficient but not completely true.

They further elaborated upon their views in Figments of Reality: The Evolution of the Curious Mind, stating that the lie-to-children concept reflected the difficulty inherent in reducing complex concepts during the education process. Stewart and Cohen noted that "[a]ny description suitable for human minds to grasp must be some type of lie-to-children", and that the truth is "much too complicated for our limited minds".

The concept gained greater exposure when Cohen and Stewart co-authored The Science of Discworld with author Terry Pratchett. In this book, the authors acknowledge that some people might dispute the applicability of the term lie, while defending it on the grounds that "it is for the best possible reasons, but it is still a lie". In an interview promoting the book, Pratchett cautioned: "Most of us need just 'enough' knowledge of the sciences, and it's delivered to us in metaphors and analogies that bite us in the bum if we think they're the same as the truth."

== Examples in education ==
A typical example of a lie-to-children is found in physics and chemistry, where the Bohr model (one type of planetary model) of atomic electron shells is still often used to introduce atomic structure before moving on to more complex models based on modern quantum mechanics. In a sense, these Bohr model diagrams can be better understood as a schematic illustrating how many electrons are in which shell and/or the redistribution of electrons in an ionic bond or covalent bond.

Similarly in chemistry, students are often introduced to the Arrhenius definitions of acids and bases before being taught the more technically correct but more complex Brønsted–Lowry model, followed by the Lewis model. This order of teaching chemistry concepts also reflects the historical progression in the development of these models.

High school teachers and university instructors often explain at the outset that the model they are about to present is incomplete. An example of this was given by Gerald Sussman during the 1986 video recording of the Abelson–Sussman Lectures:

If we're going to understand processes and how we control them, then we have to have a mapping from the mechanisms of this procedure into the way in which these processes behave. What we're going to have is a formal, or semi-formal, mechanical model whereby you understand how a machine could, in fact, in principle, do this. Whether or not the actual machine really does what I'm about to tell you is completely irrelevant at this moment.

In fact, this is an engineering model, in the same way that, [for an] electrical resistor, we write down a model V = IR—it's approximately true, but it's not really true; if I put enough current through the resistor, it goes boom, so the voltage is not always proportional to the current, but for some purposes the model is appropriate.

In particular, the model we're going to describe right now, which I call the substitution model, is the simplest model that we have for understanding how procedures work and how processes work—how procedures yield processes.

And that substitution model will be accurate for most of the things we'll be dealing with in the next few days. But eventually, it will become impossible to sustain the illusion that that's the way the machine works, and we'll go to other, more specific and particular models that will show more detail.

== Analysis ==
=== Comparison to other concepts ===
Andrew Sawyer compared the concept to that of science fiction in the article "Narrativium and Lies-to-children: 'Palatable Instruction' in The Science of Discworld", in which he wrote: "The 'lies-to-children' we tell ourselves about science are a different form of science fiction: one, perhaps where 'fiction' qualifies the word 'science'. They are 'fictions about science' rather than 'science fictions'."

Anthony Judge has noted that the concept itself is a lie-to-children for more complex concepts in the philosophy of science.

Writing for Forbes in 2015, physics professor and science journalist Chad Orzel explored how the University of California Museum of Paleontology initiative Understanding Science goes beyond a simple explanation of the scientific method in a lie-to-children format, and instead goes into more depth and specifics to directly inform others on how science impacts their daily quality of living.

=== Application across fields ===
Writing for Forbes, Tim Worstall commented on the lie-to-children's application in physics and music, where lessons on scales precede those on atonality, common time and half time precede syncopation. He noted that Newton's physics is a lie-to-children compared to Einstein's additions.

In Nonlinear Dynamics in the Life and Social Sciences, Jack Cohen discussed the application of lies-to-children to teaching evolution, including the notion of DNA's purpose as a "blueprint", stating that "[o]nly the search for universal features, while treasuring all the exceptional specifics, offers some hope of sketching out the general shape of the evolutionary process so that we can explain it honestly as a Lie-to-Children". Similarly, in Bioinformatics, Biocomputing and Perl, authors Michael Moorhouse and Paul Barry explained how the lie-to-children model may be utilized as a teaching technique for the concepts of protein, RNA, and DNA.

In a computer science paper on linear algebra instruction, D. J. Jeffrey and Robert M. Corless from the University of Western Ontario identified an example from early childhood mathematics instruction: "We happily teach children that 'you cannot take 3 from 2' because we are confident that someone will later introduce them to negative numbers." Corless followed up on this view in a subsequent paper, stating that "mathematics before computers was a lie to children".

=== Drawbacks ===
In Evolving the Alien: The Science of Extraterrestrial Life, Cohen and Stewart themselves warned of a potential side effect of lies-to-children in reducing complex science concepts to overly simplified explanations. In a paper published in Digital Difference, Jen Ross and Hamish Macleod wrote that lies-to-children can have a negative impact on learners by setting an unreasonable expectation for "simple and unambiguous questions and equally simple answers".

In the journal Metaphilosophy, Kirsten Walsh and Adrian Currie drew a distinction between "caricature" and "mythmaking" in the framework of lies-to-children, and concluded that mythmaking is unjustified. North Eastern Hill University economics professor Sudhanshu K. Mishra explored the use of mythology in parenting, such as the case of parents telling children that they were brought by a stork to the house, instead of providing a more adequate explanation of childbirth. In The Children's Bill of Emotional Rights, Eileen Johnson discussed the problems that childhood mythology could cause in the future during the parenting process. Johnson cautioned that the lie must eventually be revealed, and that parents "are not sure how much of this deceit is right, how far to go with it, and how and when to explain it was all a lie".

In a column for the Carleton College blog Earth and Mind, geophysicist Kim Kastens and her daughter Dana Chayes listed potential pitfalls, such as how a lie-to-children that must later be unlearned may provide a potential obstacle to subsequent teachers, or how a student may discern the lie. They also listed criteria to avoid the pitfalls, such as ensuring that the teacher understands the truth beyond the lie-to-children, and having a "master plan" of a learning progression that the lies-to-children work toward. In a contribution to Teaching Bilingual/Bicultural Children, Haroom Kharem and Genevieve Collura asserted that the revelation of lie-to-children makes educators seem disingenuous and undermines students' respect for them.

== See also ==
- Age appropriateness – Expected behaviour of a person for their age
- All models are wrong – Aphorism in statistics
- Half-truth – Deceptive statement
- Lesson – Structured period of time where learning is intended to occur
- List of common misconceptions
- Misinformation – Incorrect or misleading information
- Naïve physics – Untrained human perception of basic physical phenomena
- Neurath's boat – Philosophical analogy about knowledge
- Noble lie – Untruth propagated to strengthen social harmony
- Not even wrong – English phrase
- Paternalistic deception – Lies claimed to benefit the recipient
- Sunday school answer – Christian term for a simplistic answer
- Toy model – Deliberately simplistic scientific model
- Upaya – Buddhist term
- White lie – Intentionally false statement made to deceive
- Wittgenstein's ladder – Philosophical metaphor about learning
- Zone of proximal development – Concept in educational psychology
