= Wittgenstein's ladder =

Philosophical metaphor about learning

In philosophy, Wittgenstein's ladder is a metaphor set out by Ludwig Wittgenstein about learning. In what may be a deliberate reference to Søren Kierkegaard's Concluding Unscientific Postscript to Philosophical Fragments, and using a metaphor by Sextus Empiricus in the second or third century CE, the penultimate proposition of the Tractatus Logico-Philosophicus (translated from the original German) reads:

6.54

Meine Sätze erläutern dadurch, dass sie der, welcher mich versteht, am Ende als unsinnig erkennt, wenn er durch sie – auf ihnen – über sie hinausgestiegen ist. (Er muss sozusagen die Leiter wegwerfen, nachdem er auf ihr hinaufgestiegen ist.)
Er muss diese Sätze überwinden, dann sieht er die Welt richtig.

[My propositions serve as elucidations in the following way: anyone who understands me eventually recognizes them as nonsensical, when he has used them—as steps—to climb beyond them. (He must, so to speak, throw away the ladder after he has climbed up it.)
He must transcend these propositions, and then he will see the world aright.]

— Ludwig Wittgenstein, Tractatus Logico-Philosophicus

This passage suggests that, if a reader understands Wittgenstein's aims in the text, then those propositions the reader would have just read would be recognized as nonsense. From Proposition 6.4 to 6.54, the Tractatus shifts its focus from primarily logical considerations to what may be considered more traditionally philosophical topics (God, ethics, meta-ethics, death, the will) and, less traditionally along with these, the mystical. The philosophy presented in the Tractatus attempts to demonstrate just what the limits of language are—and what it is to run up against them. Among what can be said for Wittgenstein are the propositions of natural science, and to the nonsensical, or unsayable, those subjects associated with philosophy traditionally—ethics and metaphysics, for instance.

The penultimate proposition of the Tractatus, proposition 6.54, states that once one understands the propositions of the Tractatus, one will recognize that they are nonsensical (unsinnig), and that they must be thrown away. Proposition 6.54, then, presents a difficult interpretative problem. If the so-called picture theory of language is correct, and it is impossible to represent logical form, then the theory, by trying to say something about how language and the world must be for there to be meaning, is self-undermining. This is to say that the picture theory of language itself requires that something be said about the logical form sentences must share with reality for meaning to be possible. This requires doing precisely what the picture theory of language precludes. It would appear, then, that the metaphysics and the philosophy of language endorsed by the Tractatus give rise to a paradox: for the Tractatus to be true, it will necessarily have to be nonsense by self-application; but for this self-application to render the propositions of the Tractatus nonsense (in the Tractarian sense), then the Tractatus must be true.

Other philosophers before Wittgenstein, including Sextus Empiricus, Fritz Mauthner, Zhuang Zhou, and Arthur Schopenhauer, had used similar metaphors.

In his notes of 1930, Wittgenstein returns to the image of a ladder with a different perspective:

Ich könnte sagen: Wenn der Ort zu dem ich gelangen will nur auf einer Leiter zu ersteigen wäre, ich gäbe es auf dahin zu gelangen. Denn dort wo, ich wirklich hin muß, dort muß ich eigentlich schon sein.
Was auf einer Leiter erreichbar ist interessiert mich nicht.

[I might say: if the place I want to reach could only be climbed up to by a ladder, I would give up trying to get there. For the place to which I really have to go is one that I must actually be at already.
Anything that can be reached with a ladder does not interest me.]

— Ludwig Wittgenstein, Culture and Value: Revised Edition (1991)

== See also ==
- Kōan – Short instructive text in some Buddhist practices
- Lie-to-children – Teaching a complex subject via simpler models
- Neurath's boat – Philosophical analogy about knowledge
