= Keith Stanovich =

American psychologist (born 1950)

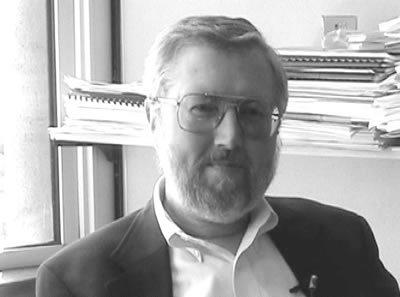
- Stanovich in 2003
- Born: December 13, 1950 (age 75); Youngstown, Ohio, US
- Known for: Study of rationality and reading development Coining the term "dysrationalia"
- Spouse: Paula Stanovich
- Awards: Albert J Harris 1988, 1992; Oscar Causey 1996; Sylvia Scribner 1997; Distinguished Scientific Contribution 2000; Grawemeyer 2010; E.L. Thorndike Career Achievement 2012

Academic background
- Education: Ohio State University (BA, 1973); University of Michigan (MA, PhD, 1977)
- Thesis: Word Recognition in Reaction Time and Tachistoscopic Tasks (1977)

Academic work
- Discipline: Psychology
- Institutions: University of Toronto; Oakland University
- Website: keithstanovich.com

Keith Edward Stanovich (born December 13, 1950) is an American psychologist. He is an Emeritus Professor of Applied Psychology and Human Development at the University of Toronto and former Canada Research Chair of Applied Cognitive Science. His primary research areas are the psychology of reasoning and the psychology of reading. Stanovich has been acknowledged by his peers as one of the most influential cognitive psychologists in the world. His 2009 book What Intelligence Tests Miss won the 2010 Grawemeyer Award in Education. In 2012, Stanovich received the E. L. Thorndike Career Achievement Award from the American Psychological Association (APA). He is a fellow at the APA, the American Psychological Society, and the Committee for Skeptical Inquiry.

== Education ==
Stanovich initially studied physics in university and only became drawn to psychology when he earned money serving as a paid subject in psychology experiments. He went on to obtain a bachelor of arts from Ohio State University as well as an MA and PhD from the University of Michigan.

== Academic career ==
Stanovich is an Emeritus Professor of Applied Psychology and Human Development at the University of Toronto and former Canada Research Chair of Applied Cognitive Science. His primary research areas are the psychology of reasoning and the psychology of reading. He has been acknowledged by his peers as one of the most influential cognitive psychologists in the world. His research in the field of reading was "fundamental to the emergence of today's scientific consensus about what reading is, how it works, and what it does for the mind", according to author David Boulton. His research on the cognitive basis of rationality has been featured in the journal Behavioral and Brain Sciences. Boulton purports that Stanovich is "a scientist's scientist and a man whose pioneering work has contributed substantially to both the cognitive science and reading science fields".

Stanovich has done extensive research on reading, language disabilities, and the psychology of rational thought. His article on the Matthew effect in education has been cited over 2,700 times in scientific literature. The Matthew Effect, with respect to education, refers to a research phenomenon regarding how new readers acquire the skills to read. Stanovich has explored the concept as well as the relationship between rationality and intelligence. He is the author of over 200 scientific articles, some of which have become Current Contents Citation Classics. In a 1993 article in the Journal of Learning Disabilities, Stanovich coined the term dysrationalia to refer to the tendency toward irrational thinking and action despite adequate intelligence.

In his 2016 book, The Rationality Quotient: Toward a Test of Rational Thinking, Stanovich and colleagues followed through on the claim that a comprehensive test of rational thinking is scientifically possible, given current knowledge. Stanovich researched people's scores on rationality tests, comparing them with their scores on conventional intelligence tests, and revealed a low correlation between them; on some tasks, he found a near-complete dissociation between rational thinking and intelligence.

Stanovich theorizes that the thinking mind consists of three parts:

- the "autonomous mind", which engages in problematic cognitive shortcuts. Stanovich calls this "type 1 processing": it happens quickly, automatically, and without conscious control.
- the algorithmic mind, which engages in "type 2 processing": the slow, laborious, logical thinking that intelligence tests measure.
- the reflective mind, which decides when the judgments of the autonomous mind will suffice versus when to employ the algorithmic mind. The reflective mind determines how rational a person is.

In a three-year survey of citation rates during the mid-1990s, Stanovich was listed as one of the fifty most cited developmental psychologists. He has also been named one of the 25 most productive educational psychologists. In a citation survey of the period 1982–1992, he was designated the most cited reading disability researcher in the world.

=== Other achievements ===
Stanovich is a fellow of the American Psychological Association (APA), the American Psychological Society, and the Committee for Skeptical Inquiry. From 1986 to 2000, he was the associate editor of Merrill-Palmer Quarterly, a human development journal.

== Awards ==
Stanovich is the only two-time winner of the Albert J. Harris Award (1988 and 1992) from the International Reading Association, for influential articles on reading. In 1995, he was elected to the Reading Hall of Fame as the youngest member of that honorary society. In 1996, he was given the Oscar Causey Award from the National Reading Conference for contributions to research, and in 1997, he received the Sylvia Scribner Award from the American Educational Research Association. In 2000, he received the Distinguished Scientific Contribution Award from the Society for the Scientific Study of Reading. He was awarded the 2010 Grawemeyer Award for Education from the University of Louisville for his 2009 book, What Intelligence Tests Miss: The Psychology of Rational Thought. He received the E. L. Thorndike Career Achievement Award from the APA in 2012.

== Publications ==
Stanovich has written nine books, six essays, and authored, or co-authored, over 200 research papers on reasoning and reading.

Books

- — (March 1, 1999). Who Is Rational?: Studies of individual Differences in Reasoning (1 ed.). Lawrence Erlbaum. ISBN 0-8058-2473-1.
- — (April 21, 2000). Progress in Understanding Reading: Scientific Foundations and New Frontiers (1 ed.). Guilford Press. ISBN 1-57230-565-7.
- — (May 15, 2004). The Robot's Rebellion: Finding Meaning in the Age of Darwin (1 ed.). University of Chicago Press. ISBN 0-226-77089-3.
- — (January 27, 2009). What Intelligence Tests Miss: The Psychology of Rational Thought (1 ed.). Yale University Press. ISBN 978-0-300-12385-2.
- — (July 30, 2009). Decision Making and Rationality in the Modern World. Oxford University Press. ISBN 978-0-19-532812-7.
- — (2011). Rationality and the Reflective Mind (1 ed.). Oxford University Press. ISBN 978-0-19-534114-0.
- — (September 29, 2012). How to Think Straight About Psychology (10 ed.). Pearson. ISBN 978-0-205-91412-8.
- — (2016). The Rationality Quotient: Toward a Test of Rational Thinking (1 ed.). MIT Press. ISBN 978-0-262-03484-5.
- — (2021). The Bias That Divides Us: The Science and Politics of Myside Bias (1 ed.). MIT Press. ISBN 978-0-262-04575-9.

== See also ==
- Cognitive miser
- Neurath's boat
