= Neurath's boat =

Philosophical analogy about knowledge

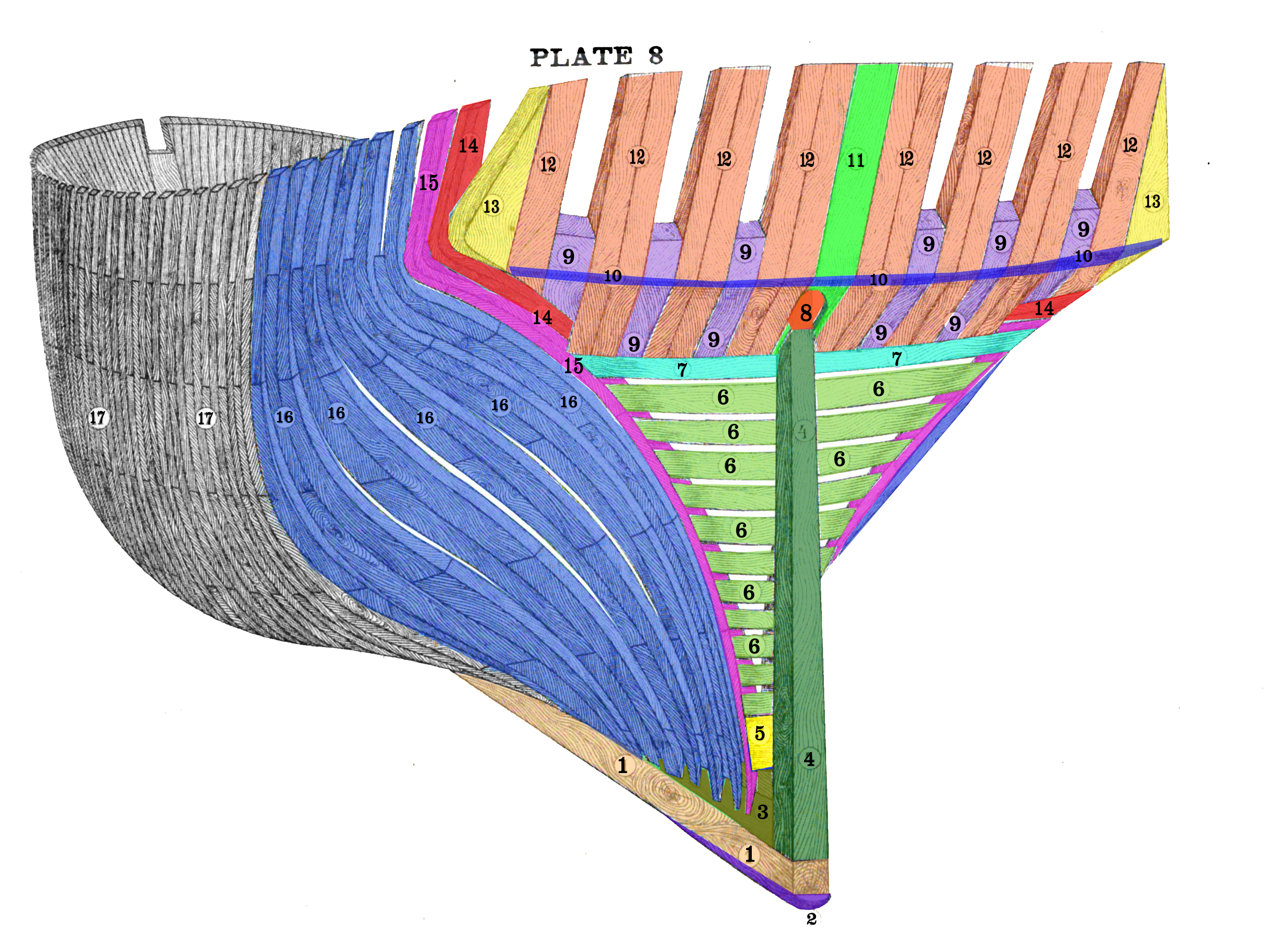
Stern view of a wooden ship, from Heinrich Paasch's Illustrated Marine Encyclopedia, 1890

Neurath's boat (or Neurath's ship) is a simile used in anti-foundational accounts of knowledge, especially in the philosophy of science. It was first formulated by Otto Neurath. It is based in part on the Ship of Theseus which, however, is standardly used to illustrate other philosophical questions, to do with problems of identity. It was popularised by Willard Van Orman Quine in Word and Object (1960).

Neurath used the simile in several occasions, first in "Problems in War Economics" (1913). In "Anti-Spengler" (1921), he wrote:

We are like sailors who on the open sea must reconstruct their ship but are never able to start afresh from the bottom. Where a beam is taken away a new one must at once be put there, and for this the rest of the ship is used as support. In this way, by using the old beams and driftwood the ship can be shaped entirely anew, but only by gradual reconstruction.

Neurath's non-foundational analogy of reconstructing piecemeal a ship at sea contrasts with Descartes's much earlier foundationalist analogy—in Discourse on the Method (1637) and Meditations on First Philosophy (1641)—of demolishing a building all at once and rebuilding from the ground up. Neurath himself pointed out this contrast.

The boat was replaced by a raft in discussions by some philosophers, such as Paul Lorenzen in 1968, Susan Haack in 1974, and Ernest Sosa in 1980. Lorenzen's use of the simile of the raft was a kind of foundationalist modification of Neurath's original, disagreeing with Neurath by asserting that it is possible to jump into the water and to build a new raft while swimming, i.e., to "start from scratch" to build a new system of knowledge.

Prior to Neurath's simile, Charles Sanders Peirce had used with similar purpose the metaphor of walking on a bog: one only takes another step when the ground beneath one's feet begins to give way.

== Neurathian bootstrap ==
Keith Stanovich, in his book The Robot's Rebellion, refers to it as a Neurathian bootstrap, using bootstrapping as an analogy to the recursive nature of revising one's beliefs. A "rotten plank" on the ship, for instance, might represent a meme virus or a junk meme (i.e., a meme that is either maladaptive to the individual, or serves no beneficial purpose for the realization of an individual's life goals). It may be impossible to bring the ship to shore for repairs, therefore one may stand on planks that are not rotten in order to repair or replace the ones that are. At a later time, the planks previously used for support may be tested by standing on other planks that are not rotten:

We can conduct certain tests assuming that certain memeplexes (e.g., science, logic, rationality) are foundational, but at a later time we might want to bring these latter memeplexes into question too. The more comprehensively we have tested our interlocking memeplexes, the more confident we can be that we have not let a meme virus enter into our mindware ...

In this way, people might proceed to examine and revise their beliefs so as to become more rational.

== See also ==
- Belief revision
- Cognitive development
- Falsificationism
- Foundherentism
- Double-loop learning
- Learning cycle
- Lie-to-children
- Rational reconstruction
- Reason maintenance
- Reflective practice
- Wide reflective equilibrium
- Wittgenstein's ladder
