= Paternalistic deception =

Lies claimed to benefit the recipient

Paternalistic deception is a type of deception that is ostensibly performed for the deceived individual's good by a person assuming a paternalistic role, whether they are their actual parent or not. The most used form of paternalistic deception are paternalist lies. They are told by an individual, a group, or an institution with the intent of benefitting the target lied to by sparing their feelings or preventing them from experiencing psychological harm. As they are justified by the assumption that they are in the target's best interest, they are a subset of prosocial lies. They can occur through omissions, half-truths, or white lies. Paternalistic lies can be manipulative, however their key feature involves the interference with the target's autonomy. This is induced by denying them access to accurate information and by limiting their behaviour choices. Confrontations with paternalistic lies can begin in early childhood and continue throughout an individual's life.

== Issues ==
Paternalistic lies are rooted in subjective assumptions, which can solely predict the target's preferences. Several studies show that targets judge paternalistic lies harshly because they perceive their autonomy to have been violated. The underlying reason is the belief in the right to know the truth. Instead, targets see paternalistic lies as an attempt to influence or coerce them through trust, as they may not have chosen the outcome for themselves or to impose an assumed superior framework of the world to the reality shaped by the truth. The lie-teller always overestimates beneficial aspects and minimizes the potential harm of the lie, resulting in a more favourable attitude. Targets, however, end up questioning the underlying benevolent intentions of the lie-teller because of the liars' subjective judgements and the consequent interference with their autonomy.

Moreover, if the deceived individual discovers they have been lied to, it can induce emotional responses such as mild disappointment, hurt, anger, or complete betrayal. Since paternalistic liars are perceived as inaccurately predicting the target's preferences, this can lead to reactance such as the derogation of the deceiver or a decrease in the outcomes' attractiveness due to the nature of it being a lie. The target can shift their preferences, as the process of being lied to becomes more important than the outcome itself.

The responses to lies depend on the desirability of outcomes and the perceived fairness by which those outcomes are obtained. If outcomes are desirable, targets will respond favourably regardless of the fairness in the process involved. However, if the outcome is undesirable, their response will account for the unfairness in the outcome's process. Since paternalistic lies are not objectively desirable compared to honesty, the targets will be less satisfied with the resulting outcome than when the same outcome is obtained via honesty.

== Risks ==
Lie-tellers are also affected by the lie. They establish an ego-protective mechanism that generates a normalization belief through comparison to equally blameworthy activities by others to try and minimize their self-discrepancy. This can be traced back to the conflict between internal values, such as protecting loved ones, and social norms around truth-telling.

Besides, studies have shown that people who have been intensely or often lied to tend to increase their frequency of deception. This finding is in line with the negative reciprocity norm, as it involves a set of beliefs favouring retribution as a counteract to being unfavourably treated. This implies that people reciprocate equally when receiving negative treatment.

== Occurrence ==
=== Parenting ===
Parents are the key figures children rely on in their developmental years. They represent their role models, which greatly influence and ground their social learning. Numerous studies indicate that parents commonly use paternalistic lies to control emotions and influence behaviour of their children. This has been found to occur cross-culturally. Tzeltal-speaking Mayans, who live in a rural community in southern Mexico, frequently lie to their children. They do not consider these lies as morally problematic and encourage their children to adopt the same practice. However, this can create an honesty paradox where parents live in a society where honesty is promoted as a social value.

A study which looked at parental lying in the U.S. and China showed that while lying by parents in both countries was widespread, a larger proportion of parents in China employed and approved of the practice in order to promote behavioral compliance in comparison to parents in the U.S. Researchers ascribed this variation to differences in cultural values.

Other findings revealed that paternalistic lies negatively influence the parent-child relationship through distrust. Furthermore, a negative correlation has been observed between the perceived frequency of lies told and parental involvement, autonomy support, and warmth.

=== Healthcare ===
Controversially, paternalistic lies are sometimes also used in physician-patient relationships. Doctors may give patients an overly optimistic prognosis to provide hope, or they occasionally use placebos on patients to prevent them from feeling disappointed if no alternative cure option is available. These practices call into question the ethics behind them. Potential problems that can arise are:

- patients' deception, which can later induce negative repercussions after finding out about the lie
- the patient's autonomy being threatened as a result not seeking a second professional opinion.
- the potential damage to the crucial trust between the professional physician, patient relationship. (and between the medical profession and patients as a whole).
- opportunity for early intervention lost for good prognosis, treatment and referral due to misdiagnosis.

== See also ==
- Lies-to-children
- Noble lie
