= Latter Rain Movement =

Latter Rain Movement may refer to:

- "Latter Rain" is a term used in Holiness and Pentecostal movements in reference to Joel 2:23.
- Latter Rain (1880s movement) was a precursor to modern Pentecostalism.
- Latter Rain (post–World War II movement) originated within Pentecostalism during the late 1940s.
