= Charismania =

Term criticising charismatic Christianity

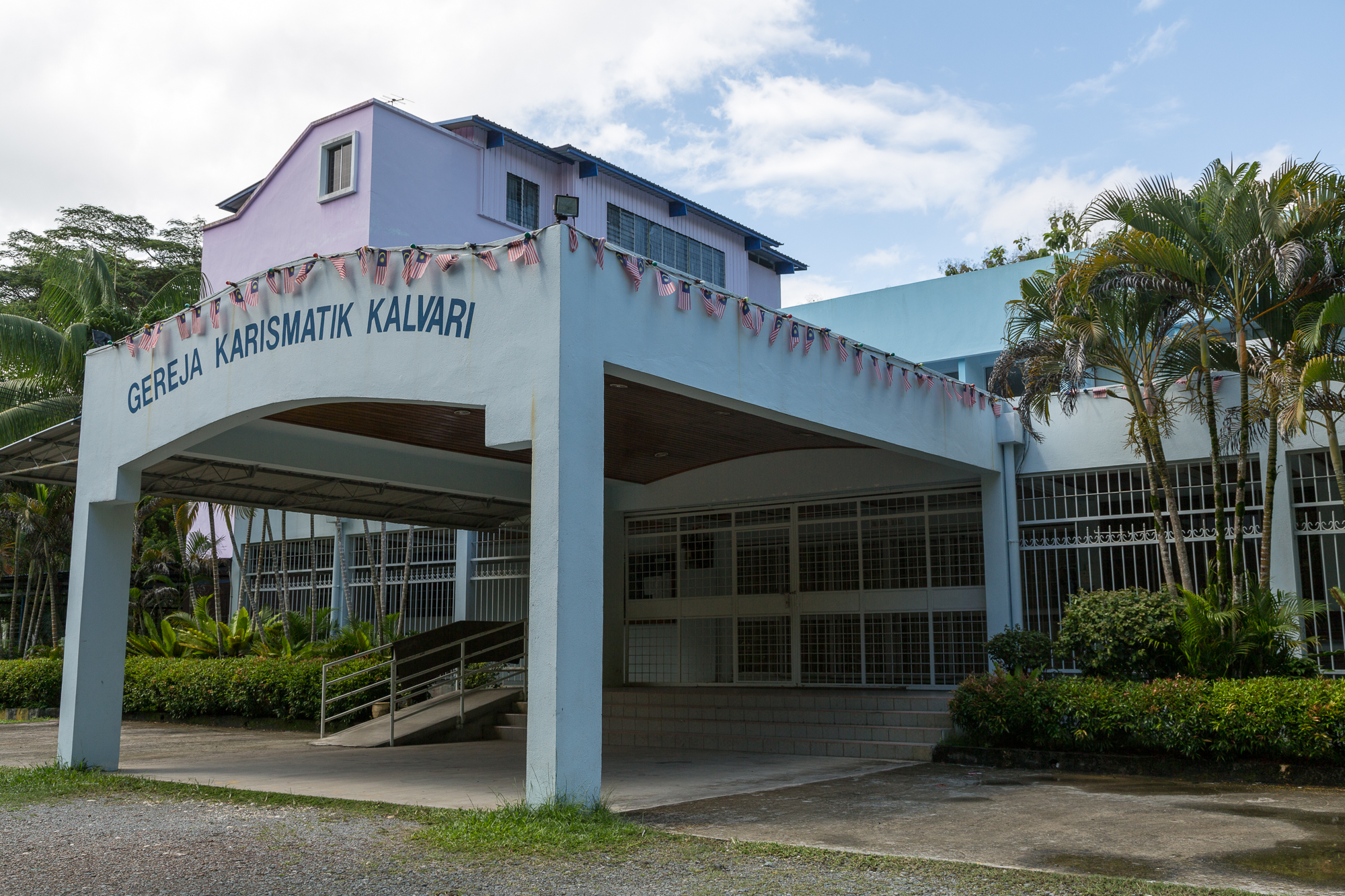
An American Charismatic church

Charismania is a term used in criticism of the charismatic movement and the prosperity gospel. It is commonly used by more conservative Christians and Evangelicalism. It criticizes and compares what the charismatics believe are gifts of the holy spirit to mania or behavior characteristic of mental illness.
