= Hugh Lupton =

British storyteller

- Born: 1952 (age 73–74)
- Occupation: Storyteller

Hugh Michael Lupton is a British storyteller, one of the most prominent figures in the tradition of oral storytelling.

== Early life and career ==
Lupton was born in 1952, the eldest child of Francis G. H. Lupton and Mary Gee/Lupton. He is the great nephew of Arthur Ransome (1884–1967) whom, as a boy, he often visited. Lupton can recall hearing his great uncle's classic children's stories set in Norfolk and the Lake District. "He (Ransome) was very old by then, in his dotage, but I remember him and stories were very important as I grew up." Lupton was born in Cambridgeshire, where there was much family heritage, and educated at the King's College School, Cambridge, Radley College.He studied to become a teacher in Norwich. As of 2013 he was based at Spratt's Green near Aylsham.

Lupton co-founded the Company of Storytellers (with Ben Haggarty and Sally Pomme Clayton) in 1985, and for a while ran a branch of The Crick Crack Club in Norfolk. Lupton tells a wide variety of stories, including epics such as Iliad and Odyssey, but also collections of shorter stories such as I become part of it (tales from the pre-world) and folktales such as The Three Snake Leaves (tales from the Grimm Forest).

== Children's books ==
- Freaky Tales from Far and Wide (1999)
- Norfolk Songline: Walking the Peddars Way (2000)
- The Songs of Birds: Poems and Stories from Many Cultures (2000)
- Tales of Wisdom and Wonder (2000), ill. Niamh Sharkey
- Pirican Pic and Pirican Mor (2003)
- The Gingerbread Man (2003)
- The Story Tree: Tales to Read Aloud (2005), ill. Sophie Fatus
- Riddle Me this: Riddles and Stories to Sharpen Your Wits (2007), ill. Sophie Fatus
- Tales of Mystery and Magic (2010), ill. Agnese Baruzzi
- la voz de los sueñosy otros cuentos(2003)

With Daniel Morden

Lupton and the Welsh storyteller Daniel Morden have written several volumes retelling ancient Greek stories.

- The Adventures of Odysseus (2006), illustrated by Christina Balit
- The Adventures of Achilles (2012), ill. Carole Hénaff
- Theseus and the Minotaur (2013), ill. Hénaff
- Orpheus and Eurydice (2013), ill. Hénaff
- Demeter and Persephone (2013), ill. Hénaff
- Greek Myths: Three Heroic Tales (2017), ill. Carole Hénaff

== Awards ==
Lupton won the "Hodja Cup" (named for the Mulla Nasreddin: "The truth is something I have never spoken.") at The Crick Crack Club's renowned Grand Lying Contest in 2010.
