= Collective Illusions (book) =

2022 book by Todd Rose

- Author: Todd Rose
- Language: English
- Publication place: United States
- English publication date: 2022
- Media type: Print (Hardcover, Paperback) and Audio CD
- ISBN: 978-0306925689

Collective Illusions: Conformity, Complicity, and the Science of Why We Make Bad Decisions is a 2022 book by author Todd Rose. The book illustrates that human thinking about one another is based on false assumptions that leads to bad decisions, and this makes the society mistrustful and individuals unhappy.

== Summary ==
According to Rose, collective illusions can be deemed as deceptive social constructs. Such phenomena occur when the majority of individuals within a group conform to something they do not genuinely support, based on the mistaken assumption that it aligns with the majority's wishes. Consequently, entire groups may engage in activities that are not genuinely desired by nearly anyone within the group.

Rose draws on examples from history, politics, and everyday life to illustrate how collective illusions can have a significant impact on society. The author also explores the psychological and sociological factors that contribute to the formation of collective illusions, such as social proof, group polarization, and cognitive dissonance. For instance, voters tend to align their voting behaviors with the perceived electability of a candidate, rather than their actual preference for the individual. This conformity bias often disadvantages nonwhite and female candidates, as there exists a collective illusion that white men are more likely to be elected. He argues that by understanding these phenomena, we can become more aware of the potential for groupthink and take steps to avoid it.

== Reception ==
The book was featured in the Wall Street Journal’s bestselling list and was also listed in the top national nonfiction bestseller by Seattle Times.
