= The Crick Crack Club =

The Crick Crack Club is a UK-based performance storytelling promoter, founded in 1987. It programs and tours public performances in theatres and art centers nationally, trains and mentors storytellers, undertakes research and advises on the use of oral storytelling in museums and educational settings.

== Programming ==
Crick Crack Club events have taken place at The British Museum, The British Library, Soho Theatre, The Barbican, Northern Stage, the Unicorn Theatre, Cheltenham Literature Festival, The Cube Microplex (Bristol), York Theatre Royal, Rich Mix Cultural Foundation and Aberystwyth Arts Centre.

The Crick Crack Club works with a core of around a dozen UK-based established performance storytellers (plus additional international artists from Northern Europe, the US and the wider world) and between five and ten emerging artists. The repertoire of each storyteller is different, and artists continually produce new work, alongside continuing to perform shows that are in their permanent repertoire. The Crick Crack Club is primarily interested in the performance and oral retelling of traditional narrative material – fairy tales, folklore mythology, legends and epics – and the content of the vast majority of performances it promotes is based on traditional stories to a greater or lesser extent.

The Crick Crack Club is the operating name of The Centre for International Storytelling which is a registered Charity. It receives funding from grant-giving organisations such as Arts Council England and The Paul Hamlyn Foundation.

== History ==
The Crick Crack Club was the first performance storytelling club to be established in the UK. From 1988–1995 26 weekly events took place every autumn and winter. Artists received fees to entertain an audience who had paid an entry fee. Unlike folk clubs there were no 'floorspots'; from the outset, the Crick Crack Club only promoted professional artists and did not encourage amateur participation. It was founded in 1987 by performance storyteller Ben Haggarty with assistance during the first year from Jenny Pearson. In January 1985 Ben Haggarty organised Britain's first storytelling festival at Battersea Arts Centre. A second festival at Watermans Art Centre in 1987 prompted an invitation for him to stage a third, 16-day-long, international storytelling festival at London's South Bank Centre in 1989. A list of international artists was drawn up, including Louise Bennett, Vi Hilbert, Abbi Patrix, Eamon Kelly, Seref Tasliova and Punaram Nishad. However, questions arose as to whether there would be enough performance storytellers in the UK with the experience and stage presence to hold large adult audiences for a whole evening with appropriate material. This concern led Ben Haggarty to found the Crick Crack Club. Many of today's leading British storytellers' first performances for adult audiences were at the Crick Crack Club. In the autumn of 1988, the first season of 26 weekly events was launched in a pub theatre in Ladbroke Grove, with the expressed aim of trying out new artists and providing an opportunity for established artists (who mainly worked in educational contexts) to develop their skills and repertoire for adult audiences.

Between 1988 and 1995, The Crick Crack Club promoted weekly events in several venues in London. From 1995 to 2001, the club organised monthly events at The Spitz, in Spitalfields, including its renowned 'Grand Lying Contest'. During this time it also organised numerous monthly events and mini-festivals in regional arts venues throughout England and elsewhere in London, including at Battersea Arts Centre, The South Bank Centre and Hoxton Hall. In addition, the Norfolk storyteller, Hugh Lupton, ran a successful monthly branch of the club during this time at the King of Hearts Arts Centre in Norwich.

From 1991–1993 Ben Haggarty was assisted by storyteller Daniel Morden, and in one year they put on 125 events across England and Wales. In 1993, in partnership with David Ambrose of St. Donats Arts Centre in Wales, the Crick Crack Club created what was to become one of the most celebrated and festive annual storytelling festivals: the Beyond the Border International Festival of Storytelling and Epic Singing. Ben Haggarty, the Crick Crack Club's Artistic Director co-directed Beyond the Border from 1993 to 2005 with specific responsibility for choosing the storytellers, while David Ambrose selected the musicians, puppeteers and other theatrical entertainers.

The Crick Crack Club entered into a partnership with Barbican Education at Barbican Arts Centre in 2003 and programmed nine events a year in the Barbican Pit Theatre for the next 9 years. In 2009 the Crick Crack Club began running monthly events at the Soho Theatre and in 2010 it began running regular events at Rich Mix. Between 2010 and 2012 The Crick Crack Club developed a circuit of regional venues.

== Origins of the name ==
In the francophone islands of the Caribbean, storytellers who want to tell a story called 'Cric?’ and those who want to hear respond with the affirmation 'Crac!’. Given the Northern British usage of Crack (Irish: Craic) to denote a story, Ben Haggarty coined the name Crick Crack Club in 1988. (Variations of the name have been subsequently used by independent groups in Edinburgh 'The Guid Craic Club', in Newcastle, 'A Bit Crack' and in Stockholm ‘ The Crick Crack Café').

== Audio archive ==
The Crick Crack Club holds the Heritage Lottery Fund funded LCIS audio archive of performance storytelling, which totals over 900 individual recordings, each with its own annotated record. It features over 220 voices and spans a period from 1983 to 2007. As a study of a reviving art form based on the oral tradition, the material ranges from the raw and experimental to the polished and formally presented. The archive includes recordings from the experimental club-nights run by The West London Storytelling Unit in London in the early 1980s; material collected by The Company of Storytellers dating from their first tour in 1985 and onwards; recordings collected at the first three UK International Storytelling Festivals in London in 1985, 87 and 89; from Beyond the Border Festival over the years and some more recent recordings from Festival at the Edge, the Barbican Arts Centre and the Unicorn Theatre. It features over 220 voices, including that of Hugh Lupton, TUUP, Sally Pomme Clayton, Ben Haggarty, Abbi Patrix and Laura Simms, as well as superb examples of some of the world's greatest surviving epic singing traditions such as Central Indian Pandavani, Rajasthani Pabuji Ki Phad, Kyrgyz Manas singing (singers of the epic of Manas), the work of Turkish Ashiks and Bangladeshi Palagan and Patuagan performers.
