= Mutual deceit =

Social situation

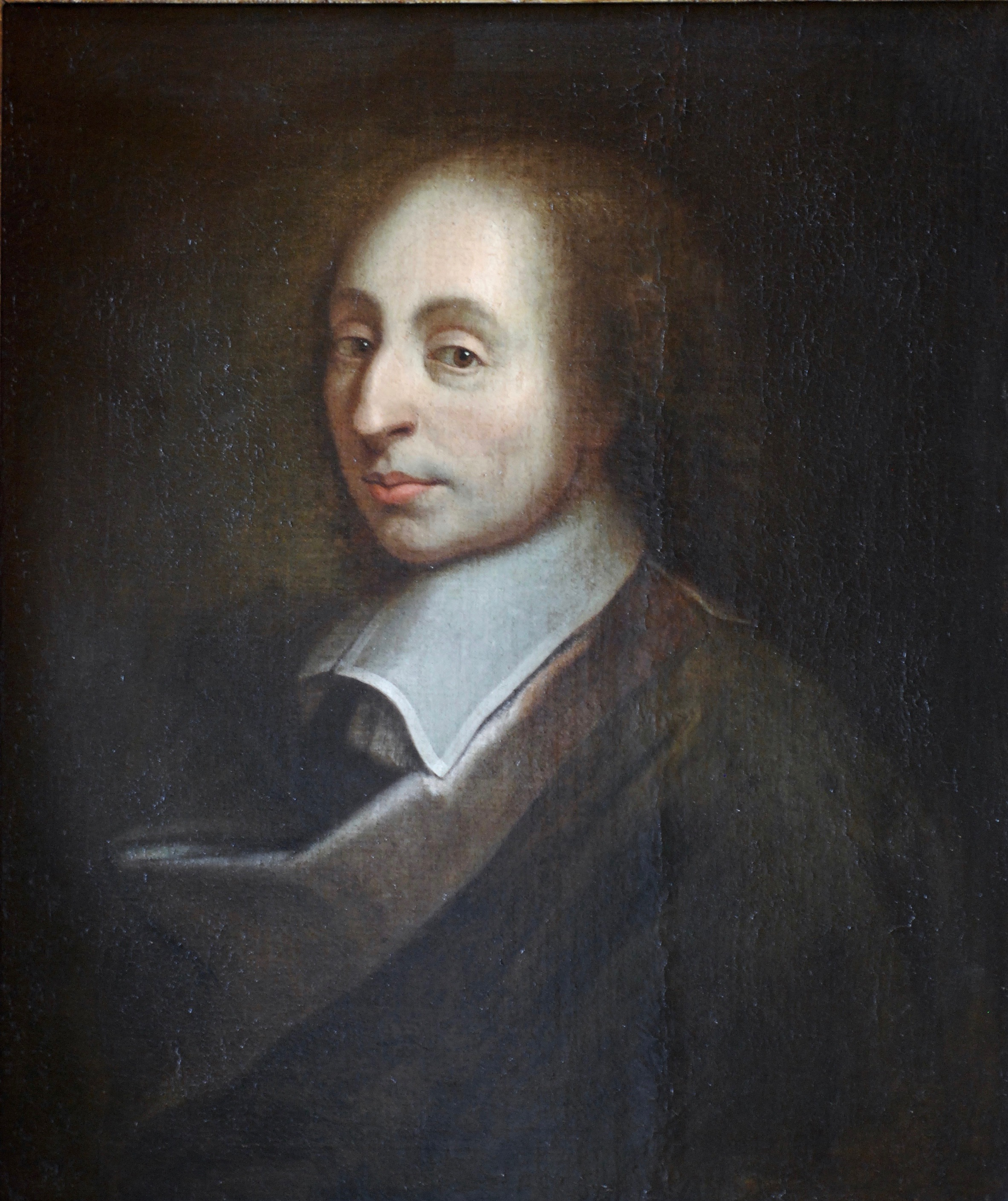
Blaise Pascal – in his description of human life as a perpetual delusion – stated that the union among men is founded upon mutual deception.

Mutual deceit is a situation wherein lying is both accepted and expected or that the parties mutually accept the deceit in question. This can be demonstrated in the case of a poker game wherein the strategies rely on deception and bluffing to win.

== Concept ==
The idea of mutual deceit has been used during the ancient times. Homer and Hesiod, for example, cited it along with theft and adultery to describe the attributes of the Greek gods that men found reproachful. These were evident in the way the gods mistreated each other, a position that was also noted by Plato as part of his criticism of the poets in the Republic.

Blaise Pascal also used mutual deceit to describe human society, citing man's capability for "disguise, falsehood, and hypocrisy both in himself and in regard to others".

Mutual deceit today is considered one of the most cited exception to telling the truth, particularly when the receiver of the information recognizes that the message being communicated is untrue. Mutuality, however, is essential and that if the participants do not know the rules or do not accept them, then it is not considered mutual deceit.

== Applications ==
Mutual deceit can be demonstrated in a film when an actor assumes a role. For example, if he plays Romeo in Romeo and Juliet, the audience watching understands what is happening – that the actor is not what he claims to be. Here, the untruth is given because everyone understands the fiction.

In business, mutual deceit is phrased as a form of collusion that constructs a double reality for those inside of or participating in it. It is aligned with the notion that truthfulness does not have an intrinsic value in business. It is distinguished from the notion of dual morality, which holds that personal values, particularly on the part of managers, must be set aside in order to focus on generating profits for shareholders. In mutual deceit, the untruths are permissible because they do not constitute lies. The reason is that if the source of information knows that those who receive it understands that it is untrue, then, no deception occurs. The spot exchange market also has some mutual deceit characteristics. Participants understand and accept that the seller underreport their true willingness-to-accept while buyers do the same for their true willingness-to-pay. In some cases, even if the buyer does not accept that the seller lies, he is implicitly doing so by entering or participating in the market.

Karl Marx, in his criticism of capitalism, cited mutual deceit as an offshoot of every new product created within the bourgeois society. The idea is that when such economic system creates a new need, man is willing to offer a new sacrifice in order to satisfy his own ego. This theme has been explored further in Marx's discourse of the power of money and its relationship with man's needs.
