= Justitia civilis =

Aspect of Christian ethics

Justitia civilis or "things external" is defined by Christian theologians as the class of acts in which fallen man retains his ability to perform both good and evil moral acts. This means that he can be kind and just, and fulfill his social duties in a manner to secure the approbation of his fellow-men. It is not meant that the state of mind in which these acts are performed, or the motives by which they are determined, are such as to meet the approbation of God; but simply that these acts, as to the matter of them, are prescribed by the moral law.
