= Sunday school answer =

Christian term for a simplistic answer

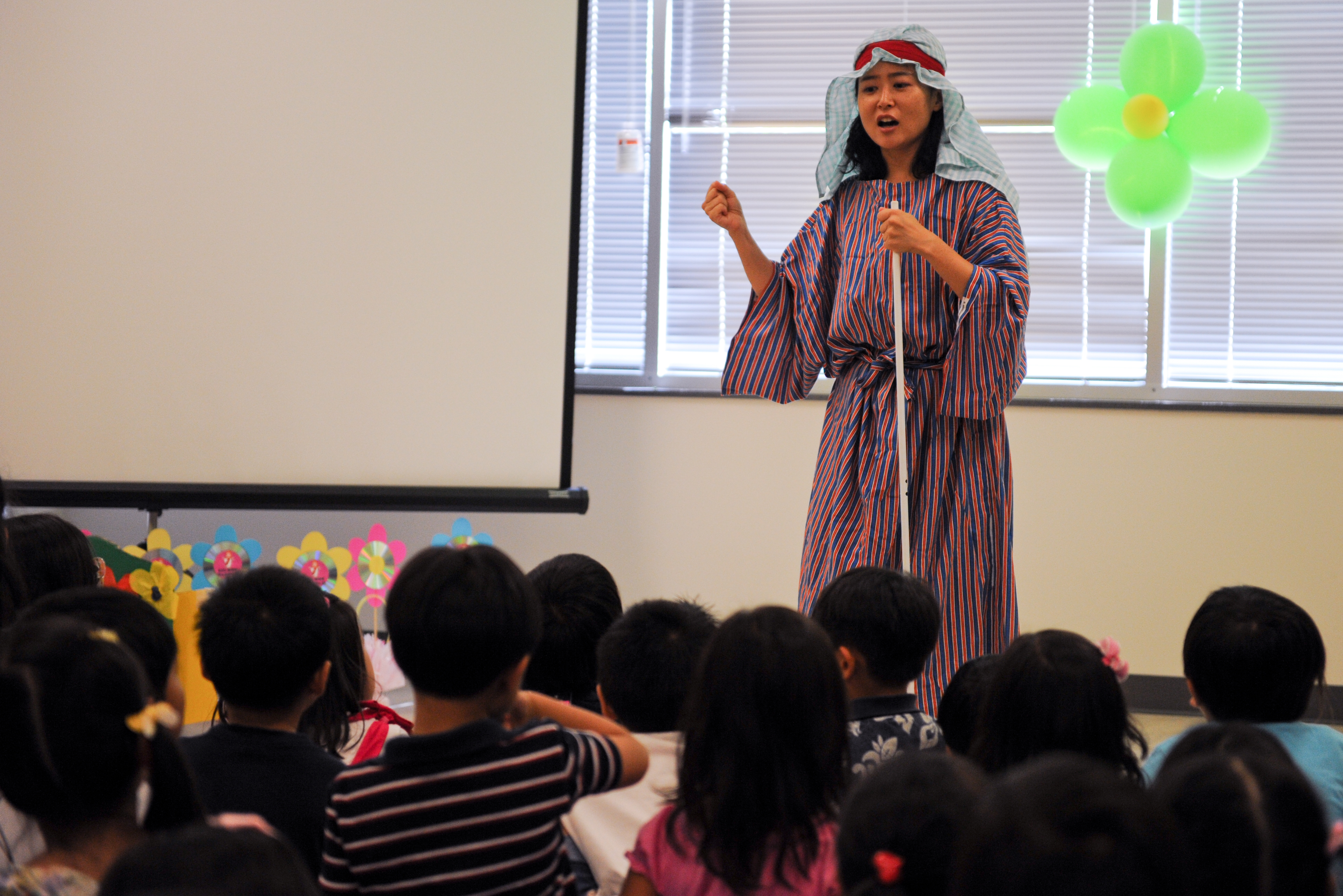
To call an answer a "Sunday school answer" is to suggest that the answer could have been provided at a Sunday school by a child who was not even listening to the question.

"Sunday school answer" is a pejorative used within Evangelical Christianity to refer to an answer as being the kind of answer one might give to a child. The phrase derives its name from the concept that certain answers are likely to be an appropriate answer to a question asked in a Sunday school even if one has not heard the question. These answers include Jesus, sin, and the cross.

For example, if a Sunday school teacher were to ask the question, "Now class, what is brown and furry and collects nuts for the winter?", a student might respond, "It sure sounds like a squirrel, but... is it Jesus?" The term "Sunday school answer" is commonly used to criticize someone for attempting to answer a complex question with an answer that is simplistic, that has not been thought out well, or that is not connected with reality. It can also be used to criticize someone for boastfully trying to call attention to their knowledge of the Bible.

According to James W. Fowler's stages of faith development, people who are in Stage 4, the "Individuative-Reflective" stage, find such answers an impediment to addressing new questions that they wish to ask.

In her book Love Letters to Miscarried Moms, Samantha Evans argues that answers dismissed as Sunday school answers "for being obvious, corny and surface-level answers... are most often the right answers".

Some Christian educators raise the concern that kids are getting too much Sunday School, eventually leading to spiritual burnout.

National Basketball Association player Jeremy Lin said in a 2013 interview that, although he "knew the Sunday school answers" while he was growing up, it was not until he became a high school freshman and joined a youth group where he experienced "radical love" that he felt like he wanted to commit to Christianity.

== In Mormonism ==
"Sunday school answer" is also used in the culture of the Church of Jesus Christ of Latter-day Saints (LDS Church) to refer to trite answers that one might provide to a question posed during the church's Sunday School classes. Such answers include "reading the scriptures, praying daily, serving ... family and others, and attending the temple and ... Sunday meetings". Church members sometimes argue that if the Sunday School answers are truly implemented in one's life, they are the answers to life's challenges.

== Bibliography ==
- Evans, Samantha (2011). Love Letters to Miscarried Moms. Thomas Nelson. ISBN 1449710034.
- Galindo, Israel (2004). The Hidden Lives of Congregations: Discerning Church Dynamics. Rowman & Littlefield. ISBN 1566996562.
- Hunt, Josh (1997). You Can Double Your Class in Two Years or Less. Group Publishing. ISBN 0764420194.
- Lawrence, Michael (2010). Biblical Theology in the Life of the Church: A Guide for Ministry. Good News Publishers. ISBN 1433524635.
- Moore, Richard G. (2006). 12 Keys to Developing Spiritual Maturity: Achieving Our Divine Potential. Cedar Fort, Inc. ISBN 1555179428.
- Putman, David (2010). Detox for the Overly Religious. B&H Publishing Group. ISBN 1433669641.
- Sanders, Brian (2009). Life After Church: God's Call to Disillusioned Christians. InterVarsity Press. ISBN 0830876162.
- Wax, Trevin (2013). Gospel-Centered Teaching: Showing Christ in All the Scripture. B&H Publishing Group. ISBN 1433681722.
- Weibel, Suzy (2007). Secret Diary Unlocked Companion Guide: My Struggle to Like Me. Moody Publishers. ISBN 1575674459.
