= Capitalism as Religion =

Walter Benjamin's unfinished work

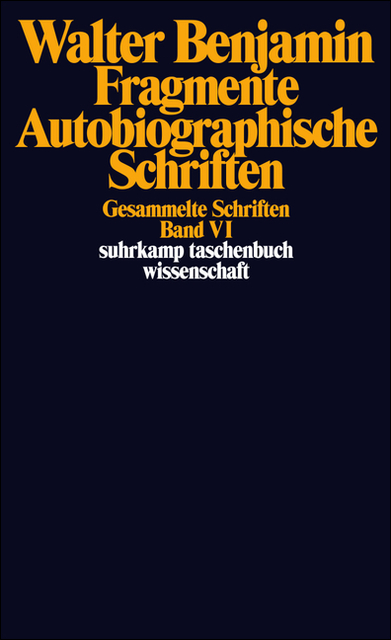
- Cover of the first edition, Volume VI of Collected Works (1985)
- Author: Walter Benjamin
- Original title: Kapitalismus als Religion
- Language: German
- Genre: Philosophy of history Sociology Political philosophy
- Publisher: Suhrkamp
- Publication date: 1985

"Capitalism as Religion" (German: Kapitalismus als Religion) is Walter Benjamin's (1892–1940) unfinished work, written in 1921. It was published in 1985 and forms part of Benjamin's early sketches on social and political theory, religion, and the theory of history.

In this fragment, (Note: The publishers categorized this text as "mixed content fragments".) Benjamin argues that capitalism should be understood as a religion. This thesis reinterprets Max Weber's view of the Protestant work ethic as a condition for capitalism’s emergence. Rather than viewing capitalism as influenced by religious origins, Benjamin argues it is itself a religious phenomenon. He identifies three key features: its nature as a pure cult without dogma, its continuous duration, and its emphasis on guilt rather than atonement. Rather than directly opposing Weber, Benjamin radicalizes and extends his ideas.

The text employs allegory and metaphor, particularly the term Schuld, which can mean both guilt and debt. Capitalism, according to Benjamin, creates an escalating cycle of guilt, ultimately implicating even God and leading to despair and world-destruction. He critiques thinkers such as Friedrich Nietzsche, Karl Marx, and Sigmund Freud for replicating capitalist logic in their theories. It remains unclear whether Benjamin envisions a way to escape this system of guilt.

This fragment marks the first instance in Benjamin’s work of a theological interpretation of capitalist modernity. It anticipates later themes in his Arcades Project and related writings. Scholarly interest in the text grew in the early 21st century, particularly in the context of post-secular thought. The Italian philosopher Giorgio Agamben further developed its ideas on capitalism as a religious formation.

== Summary ==
In Capitalism as Religion, Walter Benjamin argues that capitalism functions as a religious system. Unlike Max Weber, who saw capitalism as shaped by religious origins, Benjamin contends that capitalism is itself a religious phenomenon, replacing traditional religions by offering answers to existential anxieties such as "cares, torments, worries." He avoids offering definitive proof, claiming the time for such analysis has not yet arrived.

The author identifies three characteristics of capitalism as a religion. First, capitalism is a "pure religion of the cult," probably the most radical religion that has ever existed. Every element of the cult makes sense only in direct relation to the cult; utilitarianism takes on a religious connotation. The cult has no dogma or theology of its own. Second, the capitalist cult is never interrupted, it continues permanently, "sans rêve et sans merci"; in capitalism, both weekdays and holidays disappear, resulting in "an extreme tension of joy". Third, the cult bestows guilt, so it is probably the first cult not aimed at redemption but at accusation.

Benjamin describes this religious system as "destructive and monstrous." Rather than offering salvation, it leads to despair, where ruin is mistaken for hope. Capitalism secularizes and internalizes guilt, stripping religion of transcendence and turning it into immanent human destiny. Nietzsche’s Übermensch exemplifies this ethos—a figure not of salvation but of intensified human power and guilt.

Benjamin sees parallels between capitalist logic and the thought systems of Nietzsche, Freud, and Marx. Freud's unconscious mirrors capitalism's repressed forces, Nietzsche’s doctrine intensifies guilt rather than resolving it; and Marx’s socialism inherits the guilt-driven structure of capitalism. Each replicates the moral economy of the capitalist cult.

Benjamin further argues that Christianity, especially post-Reformation, became intertwined with capitalism. Rather than merely enabling capitalism, Christianity was transformed into it. He compares the veneration of saints with the symbolism of money, noting how spiritual "preoccupations" evolve into social symptoms of guilt. The essay concludes with a methodological proposal to study the mythological function of money throughout history. Benjamin draws a final comparison between capitalism and ancient paganism, suggesting that both treat religion as practical and immediate, rather than ideal or transcendental.

== Creation ==
=== Manuscript characteristics ===
The fragment Capitalism as Religion is an unfinished draft by Walter Benjamin, written as a working note rather than a completed text. It consists of three manuscript sheets containing a coherent but untitled text, followed by notes, bibliographic references, and annotations. German scholar Uwe Steiner identifies three parts: (1) an untitled main body across two sheets; (2) an inserted passage titled Money and Weather on the third sheet; and (3) a final section comprising isolated theses and keywords. The phrase Capitalism as Religion appears only above the final section, on the reverse of the last page.

The fragment can be dated to mid- to late 1921, based on the presence of a bibliographic list that includes Erich Unger's book (published in January 1921), works by Weber, Ernst Tröltsch, Georges Sorel, Gustav Landauer, and Adam Müller. Editors Rolf Tiedemann and Hermann Schweppenhäuser, analyzing the references—particularly Müller’s inclusion in the second part—suggest a date no earlier than mid-1921. Scholars Michael Levi and Joachim von Soosten favor late 1921.

The Money and Weather section, excluded from the published version, was instead included in the notes to Benjamin’s One-Way Street (1928), where it links to an unrealized critique of Paul Scheerbart's novel Lesabéndio (1913). Although Benjamin had engaged with this text during the First World War, his full treatment of it has not survived. Some of these ideas later appeared in the aphorism “Tax Advice” in One-Way Street.

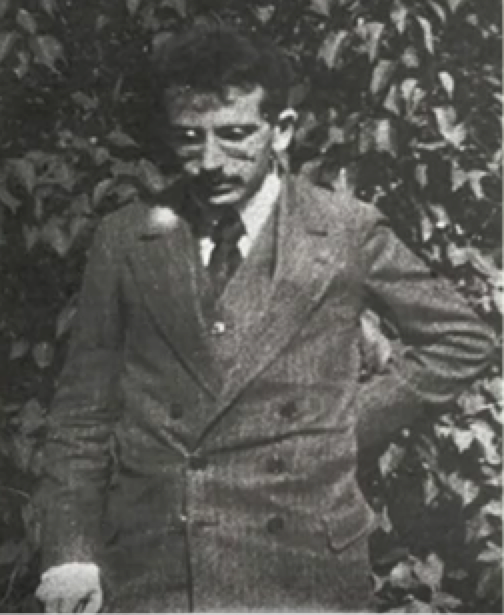
Walter Benjamin in Bern in 1917

The fragment belongs to Benjamin’s pre-Marxist phase and forms part of his early investigations into myth, religion, and aesthetics. It is stylistically typical: lacking formal structure, paragraph divisions, and a linear argument. Alongside Towards a Critique of Violence (1919) and the Theologico-Political Fragment (1921), it represents an early formulation of Benjamin’s theory of history and political thought. Steiner suggests that Benjamin planned to include all three texts, as well as a further critique of Scheerbart’s work, in a larger, unrealized political project titled Genuine Politics and the Genuine Politician.

=== Title problem ===
The title Capitalism as Religion appears only on the reverse of the last manuscript page, written above the final set of notes. Scholar Daniel Weidner argues that the title was likely added later, as there was sufficient space on the front page for a title. This suggests it may not have been part of the original composition.

Some commentators, notably Michael Löwy, argue that the title may have been inspired by Ernst Bloch's book Thomas Münzer: Theologian of the Revolution (1921), where the phrase appears. If this influence is confirmed, the text could not have been written before late 1921. Benjamin and Bloch had a close intellectual relationship, having spent time together in Switzerland during World War I. In a letter to Gershom Scholem dated November 27, 1921, Benjamin mentioned receiving a proof of Bloch’s book, supporting the view that he had read it shortly after its completion.

Conversely, some scholars, including Werner Hamacher, suggest that Bloch may have borrowed the phrase from Benjamin, rather than the reverse.

According to Weidner, the title is not a declarative statement ("Capitalism is a Religion") nor a simple conjunction ("Capitalism and Religion"). Rather, it is performative: it instructs the reader to consider capitalism as if it were a religion. The text itself does not define the title but opens with the proposition that capitalism can be interpreted in religious terms.

== Analysis ==
=== Christianity and Capitalism: Benjamin and Weber ===
Walter Benjamin’s Capitalism as Religion is deeply informed by Max Weber’s The Protestant Ethic and the Spirit of Capitalism (1904). At the outset, Benjamin cites Weber’s thesis that capitalism emerged as a religiously conditioned formation. Later, he returns to the idea, asserting that Reformed Christianity did not merely influence capitalism but ultimately transformed into it. Benjamin references Weber twice—once in the text and once in the bibliography—alongside other figures such as Ernst Troeltsch, whose The Social Doctrine of the Christian Churches (1912) is also cited. (Note: Trölch took positions similar to Weber's on the emergence of capitalism. In addition to Weber and Trölch, the religious basis of capitalism was discussed, according to the Italian commentator Carlo Salzani, in the Bruno Archibald Fuchs and Adam Müller's works included in the bibliography, and possibly in the texts of the 19th century German economist Gustav von Schönberg (Benjamin mentions his works). As Levy notes, Weber's now-forgotten opponent, B. A. Fuchs, tried unsuccessfully to argue in The Spirit of Bourgeois-Capitalist Society (1914) that the origins of capitalism lay in the Middle Ages-in the asceticism of medieval monastic orders and the papal centralization of the Catholic Church.)

Weber argued that the ascetic Protestant ethic, particularly among Puritans, fostered a mentality conducive to capitalist development: salvation anxiety was alleviated through diligent work and frugality, turning material success into a secularized moral indicator. Over time, this ethic lost its religious telos and became self-perpetuating, fueling the rise of modern capitalist society. Weber’s thesis challenged the Marxist view that social being determines consciousness, framing capitalism as arising from religious ideals rather than purely economic conditions.

Benjamin’s intervention is widely seen as a radical inversion of Weber’s position. While Weber saw capitalism as shaped by religion, Benjamin asserts that capitalism is a religion—an autonomous, theological structure. As Uwe Steiner notes, Benjamin “returns Weber’s discourse on the irresistible power of capitalism to the religious level from which, according to Weber himself, it emerged. For Benjamin, capitalism is not merely enabled by religious ideas—it functions as a cultic system of guilt, without redemption.

Judith Mormann and Samuel Weber argue that Benjamin rejects the possibility of external critique: we do not “get caught” in the net of capitalism—we stand in it. Thus, Benjamin avoids comprehensive polemics that might reproduce capitalist structures, choosing instead a fragmentary, allegorical method. The text critiques from within the immanent system, addressing the impossibility of critical distance. Some scholars, like Michael Löwy, argue that Benjamin’s position replaces Weber’s “axiologically neutral” account with an explicit anti-capitalist critique.

Others, including Daniel Weidner, suggest that Benjamin does not aim to overcome Weber, but uses his thesis allegorically. Benjamin’s approach emphasizes the mimetic and symbolic, portraying capitalism and Christianity as structurally linked in a parasitic relationship—mirroring and distorting one another.

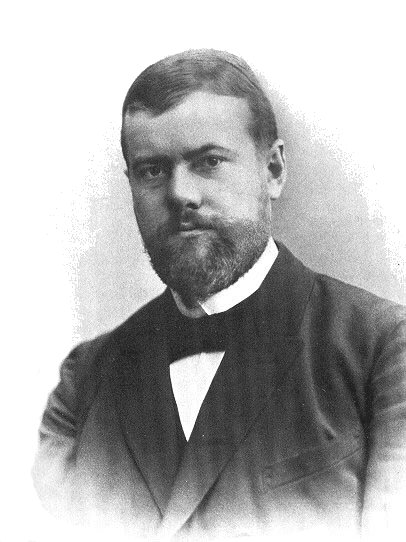
Max Weber

German sociologist Christoph Deutschmann contends that any comparison between capitalism and religion presupposes a general theory of religion—something even Weber avoided. Following Niklas Luhmann, Deutschmann argues that religion defies generic definition, being both conceptually elusive and structurally paradoxical. Capitalism, like religion, cannot be defined in abstract terms but only through the aporias it generates.

Benjamin’s notion of capitalism departs from both Weber and Marx by treating it not strictly as a modern economic system, but as a transhistorical, spiritual structure. William Rasch describes it as a “collapsing and monstrous movement” of guilt. From this view, all of Western history reflects the unfolding of the capitalism–Christianity relationship. Theologian Joachim von Soosten claims that Christianity becomes capitalism’s original sin, and vice versa. Norbert Bolz frames this relationship within a theological anthropology: capitalism, like myth, offers a totalizing structure that absorbs Christianity, transforming it from a liberating force into a closed system. Benjamin, drawing on Hermann Cohen’s critique of fate, opposes capitalism’s mythic immanence to religion's promise of transcendence. Hence, capitalism is not truly religion—it is myth in the guise of religion.

Some interpretations suggest that Benjamin, especially in his comparison of capitalism to paganism, saw both Christianity and capitalism as forms of neo-paganism—“so-called” religions. According to Werner Hamacher, Benjamin understood paganism not as ancient polytheism but as a condition of fallen existence extended to thought and behavior. From this view, Benjamin may have seen monotheistic Judaism as the only truly redemptive religious form. Steiner, however, maintains that Benjamin distinguished between religious consciousness and political consciousness, the latter oriented toward secular happiness. Nathan Ross critiques this, noting that Benjamin treats capitalism as a questionable and perverse form of religion. For Rasch, capitalism represents religion in its Urform—its original, unredeemed state. The dialectic of secularization collapses into immanence, and transcendence re-emerges only through this collapse. This position distances Benjamin from both secularization theory and political theology. Bolz notes that, unlike Weber, who retained a vocational-spiritual dimension in work, Benjamin's critique holds onto the possibility of repentance and catharsis, positioning him as a theologian of history rather than of religion per se.

The influence of Ernst Bloch is also notable. In Thomas Münzer: Theologian of the Revolution (1921), Bloch described capitalism as a satanic inversion of Christianity, realized through Calvinism. While Bloch saw Calvin’s reforms as an apostasy from true Christianity, Benjamin went further: capitalism is not a corruption of Christianity, but its theological essence.

Benjamin’s fragment is often grouped with other anti-capitalist appropriations of Weber by thinkers like Bloch, Lukács, and Fromm. However, Benjamin’s return to Weber in his Theses on the Philosophy of History (1940), specifically in Thesis XI, suggests a persistent concern with the theological underpinnings of capitalist modernity—even when Weber's name is not explicitly mentioned.

=== Absence of dogmatism and perpetuity ===
In Capitalism as Religion, Walter Benjamin radicalizes Max Weber’s ideas, even as he refrains from citing him directly. While Weber’s thesis of secularization emphasized the transition from religious to rational forms of life, Benjamin’s fragment recasts capitalism as a uniquely modern cult, more radical and exceptional than any traditional religion. He presents capitalism as a theological structure without transcendence—a total, all-encompassing system of meaning.

A defining feature of this capitalist cult is the absence of dogma or theology. Meaning is always immediate—unmittelbar, in Benjamin’s words—arising directly from cultic activity. This distinguishes capitalism from historical religions, where ritual is mediated by belief or doctrine. In capitalism, however, all meaning flows from action itself, dissolving the distance between belief and practice. This immediacy of meaning introduces a utilitarian theology, in which practical actions—investment, speculation, financial transactions—become sacred rituals. As Michael Löwy notes, even mundane economic practices like commodity exchange or stock speculation take on a religious character. Samuel Weber further argues that utilitarianism, in this context, implies the quantification and even deification of number: "the greatest happiness for the greatest number" becomes a theological maxim. Benjamin’s vision replaces doctrine with ritualized behavior—a perpetually enacted cult. This cult saturates everyday life, synchronizing means and ends, money and meaning, the signifier and the signified. In place of reflective belief, capitalism offers rituals that trap individuals within an ever-expanding network of values from which there is no external vantage point.

Norbert Bolz describes this as a “daily festival of commodity fetishism,” where exchange value is experienced with religious ecstasy. According to Bolz, this view prefigures Benjamin’s later concept of “phantasmagoria”, central to his critique of capitalist modernity. The absence of dogma aligns capitalism with paganism or pantheism. Wolfgang Palaver compares Benjamin’s formulation to Alexander Rüstow's interpretation of Spinoza’s Deus sive natura as an economic theology: the invisible hand of the market as a divine, self-regulating force. This pantheistic capitalism deifies nature and the market alike, reducing divine agency to mechanistic self-correction^{.} Yet Benjamin’s cult is not a Weberian “sect” based on shared moral ideals or a conscious community. Rather, it is an ineluctable system of participation. As William Rasch points out, no one is excluded from the cult—not atheists, the unemployed, or even Marxist critics. Salaries, pensions, mortgages, and consumer debt are the rites through which all participate in the capitalist liturgy.

Judith Mormann emphasizes that this non-repressive participation distinguishes Benjamin from Marxist frameworks based on domination or ideological control. Benjamin anticipates the argument of Luc Boltanski and Ève Chiapello, who in The New Spirit of Capitalism (1999) reject the Weberian ethic in favor of motivational incentives and diffuse modes of inclusion. However, unlike Boltanski and Chiapello, Benjamin sees participation not as motivational but structural: compulsory, not voluntary.

Despite its lack of theology, the capitalist cult regulates time and space with totalizing force. Traditional religious festivals were cyclic, confined to specific times and places. In contrast, capitalism’s cult is ceaseless—it has no beginning or end, no holidays, no sabbath. Every day is holy, every moment demands "extreme tension of joy"—a paradoxical celebration without respite. This abolition of temporal differentiation collapses the sacred and the profane. Hamacher notes that the distinction between these domains is compressed into a single point of immediate co-presence; the present loses all depth, becoming undifferentiated. In von Soosten’s reading, this cult is not merely spectacle in the Marxist sense, but an ongoing theological drama that cannot conclude until the cult has exhausted itself.

Benjamin’s formulation—"the permanent duration of the cult"—is a critical inversion of Weber’s analysis of Calvinist morality. Weber noted how the Reformation abolished ecclesiastical feast days, replacing them with continuous labor and psychological discipline. What was once heroic self-restraint has, by the 20th century, become obligatory self-exploitation. In Benjamin’s vision, this process is complete: the capitalist subject becomes a mechanical professional, a being condemned to perform the cult indefinitely. This continuity also echoes Ernst Bloch’s critique of Calvinism in Thomas Münzer: Theologian of the Revolution, where God is reduced to a celestial accountant, and divine grace becomes an impersonal ledger of economic behavior".

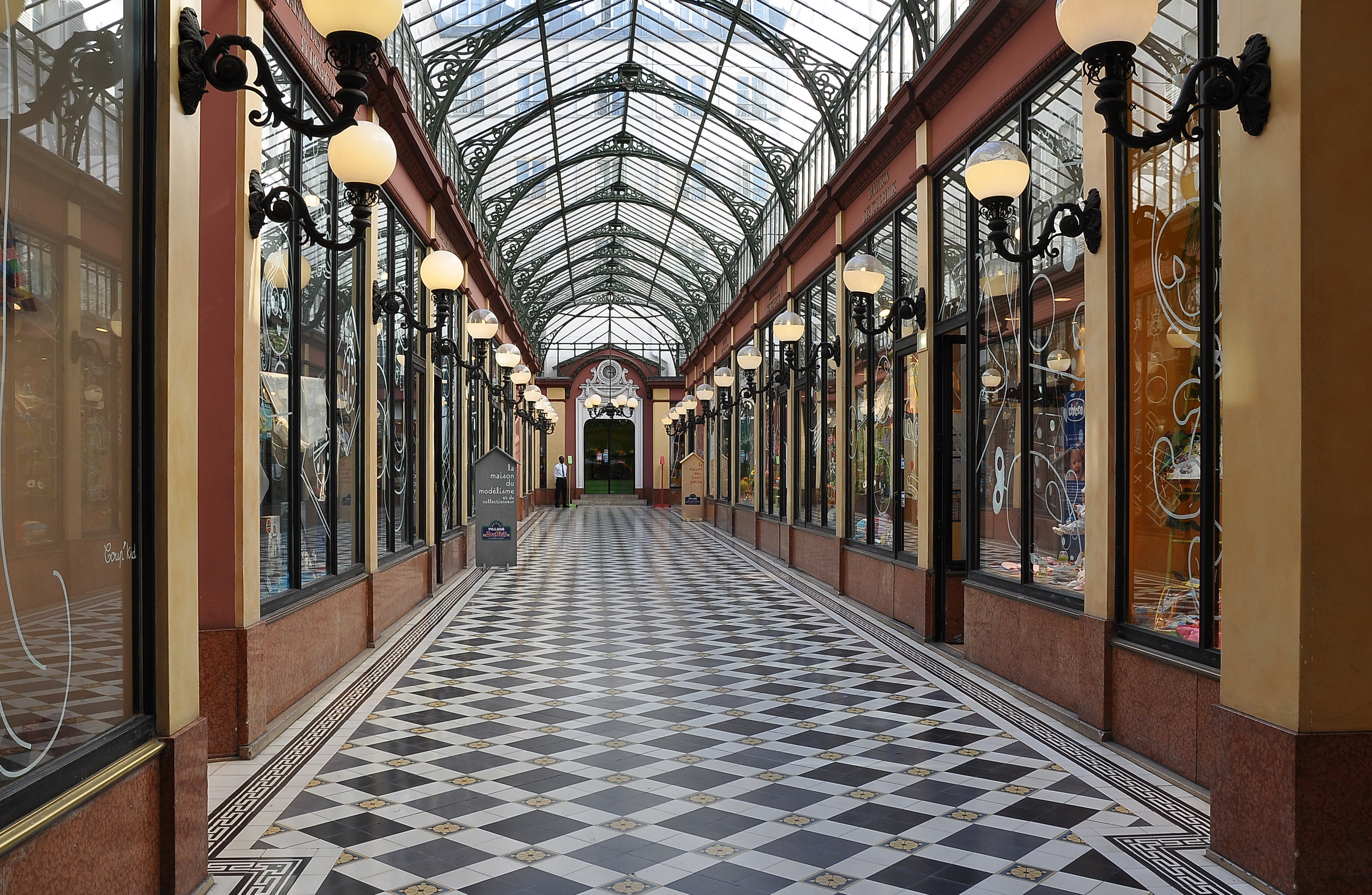
Princes' Passage (1860), modern reconstruction

To illustrate the unrelenting nature of this cult, Benjamin employs the French phrase “sans rêve et sans merci” (literally “without sleep and without mercy”). Many scholars believe this contains a typographical error, and that Benjamin intended trêve (“truce”), rendering the phrase: “without respite and without mercy. The phrase likely alludes to Baudelaire’s poem “Evening Twilight” from Les Fleurs du mal, which Benjamin was translating in 1921. (Note: And the thieves who show no respite or mercy, Will soon be setting to work, as they tenderly, They too, toil at forcing safes and doorways, To live, clothe their girls, for a few more days. (Translated by A. S. Kline)) Whether referencing Baudelaire or medieval chivalric codes (as per Léon Gautier’s Ten Commandments of Chivalry), the image conveys an unending, merciless rhythm that invades even night and rest. As S. Weber notes, Benjamin elsewhere laments that in Paris, artificial light erases the natural twilight: even the night is subsumed into capitalist productivity. The rhythm of sleep, like holidays, is abolished. Italian philosopher Carlo Salzani observes that Benjamin’s fascination with the theme of sleep—as symbolic resistance to capitalist time—emerges more fully in the 1930s, particularly in the Arcades Project.

Finally, the concept of perpetual ritual creates a paradox: cultic practices must occur in a particular space and time, yet capitalism claims infinite, total reach. Benjamin resolves this paradox through the theatrical logic of fashion. Drawing on his own theory of allegory from The Origin of German Tragic Drama, Benjamin shows how modernity transforms time into spatialized spectacle. Fashion, with its merging of repetition and novelty, becomes the medium through which capitalism captures and disciplines both time and identity.

=== Schuld: "debt-as-guilt" ===
At the core of Walter Benjamin’s Capitalism as Religion is the figurative notion of Schuld, the German word that connotes both debt and guilt. (Note: The noun Schuld (the earliest form is Sculd) is derived from the abstract verb sculan (the modern form is soll, to be owed). Originally the word denoted a financial obligation, something owed to someone, but today this meaning is restricted to debt. The semantic shift towards guilt and culpability was connected with the decline of the ancient Germanic legal institution of Wergild (a fine paid for certain crimes) and with the influence of Christian doctrine — the word acquired connotations of compulsory repentance for atonement, and then of wrongdoing, crime, sin. Vergeld is one of the key words recorded by Benjamin in the last part of the fragment. The multiple meanings present a difficulty in translating the fragment, Schuld is translated both as "duty" and "guilt", sometimes both are used; S. Weber suggested the phrase "debt-as-guilt".) This semantic ambiguity encapsulates capitalism’s “demonic ambiguity”—its third defining characteristic—wherein economic debt inevitably implies moral, legal, or emotional guilt. According to Norbert Bolz, Benjamin’s identification of guilt as universal within capitalism critiques two dominant traditions: Max Weber’s justification of Western rationality through Protestant ethics, and Sigmund Freud’s psychological-religious theories of guilt. Christoph Menke and George Steiner have pointed out that Benjamin uses guilt where Weber used rationality—as a structuring force of modern society. In doing so, Benjamin reveals a practical and magical rationality underlying both economic and religious life, predating modern distinctions between religion and irrationality.

In Western theology, guilt is closely tied to the concept of original sin. However, guilt, unlike sin, implies the possibility of forgiveness, including the forgiveness of debt. This ambiguity—between moral culpability and economic obligation—is not unique to Benjamin. As Weidner notes, this interweaving of economic and moral discourses was common in early 20th-century German thought, particularly among figures like Heinrich Rickert, Georg Simmel, and Max Weber. For these thinkers, the notion of value was not purely economic; it bore spiritual, cultural, even eternal dimensions, and its opposite—Schuld—could similarly transcend mere financial debt. Michael Löwy connects Benjamin's argument to Weber’s depiction of Puritanism, in which the individual is burdened with responsibility for wealth received as a sign of divine election. Similarly, Hermann Cohen, in The Ethics of Pure Will (1904), viewed guilt and fate as mythic origins of poetry and religion—an influence visible in Benjamin’s writings.

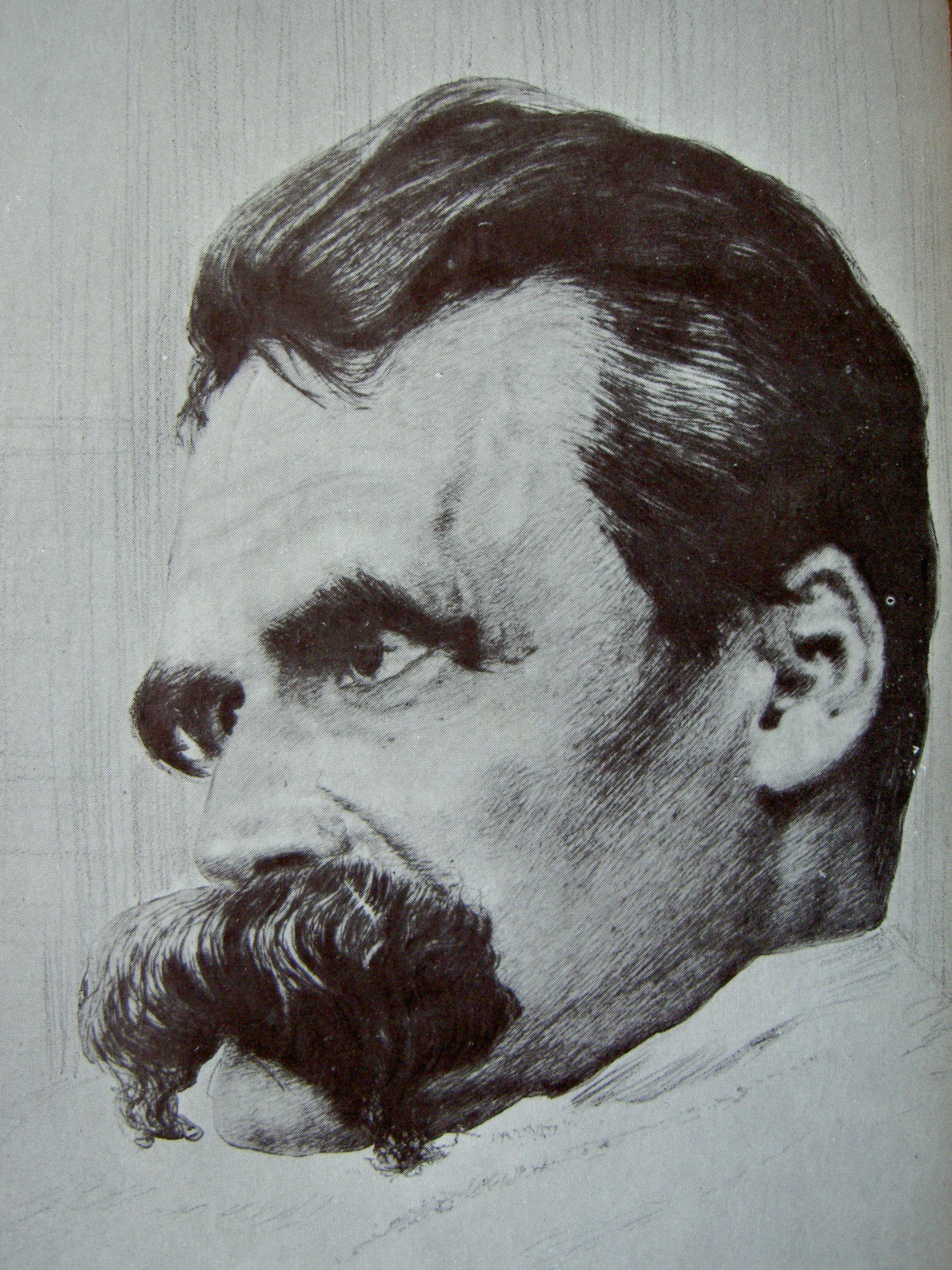
Friedrich Nietzsche

The primary philosophical source of Benjamin’s notion of “demonic guilt” is Friedrich Nietzsche. In On the Genealogy of Morality, Nietzsche traces the moral concept of guilt (Schuld) back to its material origin in debt (Schulden)". Guilt, he writes, arises from the ancient “contractual relationship between creditor and debtor”, rooted in trade, repayment, and enforcement. This moral economy culminates in punishment, and ultimately, in the ascent of the Christian God, whose moral omnipotence reflects the maximum guilt borne by humanity.

Benjamin appropriates Nietzsche’s theory, applying it to capitalism’s internal logic. However, he resists Nietzsche’s linear causality between debt and guilt. Instead, Benjamin maintains an oscillating tension between these meanings. Guilt is not reducible to economic debt, nor is it wholly theological—it is a site of demonic ambiguity. Weidner likens this ambiguity to Michel Riffaterre's idea of the double sign, where a symbol carries two conflicting semiotic codes. (Note: In Riffater's terms, the double sign refers to and thus superdetermines different and even contradictory semiotic codes, it cannot be paraphrased through these codes; an example would be a pun.) Thus, Benjamin’s claim that capitalism is a religion reveals itself as a contradiction: it is both religion and not religion, but rather a demonic system of control. As Hamacher notes, this indeterminacy abolishes the possibility of liberation, subordinating the individual to economic forces that appear mythically fated.

The “demonic”, in Benjamin’s early work, refers to a blurring of categories—especially the entanglement of law, guilt, and fate. In Fate and Character and Toward the Critique of Violence, Benjamin argues that law does not abolish the order of fate, but preserves it: the subject is condemned not to punishment, but to guilt. In Fate and Character, Benjamin contrasts fate, rooted in myth and guilt, with character, a singular, comic principle associated with theater. Law, derived from myth, operates through generalization and guilt, whereas comedy interrupts this logic.

The fragment also references Georges Sorel’s “Discourse on Violence”, emphasizing the link between law and mythical violence. (Note: The pair of concepts corresponds to the political strike and the general proletarian strike in Sorel.) In Critique of Violence, Benjamin distinguishes between mythical violence, which sustains law through guilt and punishment, and divine violence, which destroys law without reproducing guilt. This opposition implies a theological critique of capitalism, which operates through a mythical regime of unredeemable guilt.

The notion of guilt is tied to naked life (das bloße Leben)— (Note: Giorgio Agamben drew attention to this concept. In a series of works, he developed the concept of the naked life (Italian: la nuda vita).) life stripped of political and ethical agency. As Benjamin argues in Critique of Violence, guilt adheres to biological existence when human beings are reduced to their mere survival under legal and economic systems. As Samuel Weber explains, the naturalization of life within the order of law enables its inclusion in the network of guilt. Under capitalism, this guilt becomes ontological. Debt is interiorized, no longer based on action or belief, but inscribed in the very structure of existence. As Weber puts it, fate becomes the appropriation of life by the logic of guilt. This structure mimics paganism and Christianity, which also revolve around infinite guilt and redemption, but capitalism severs the possibility of grace or forgiveness. Instead, guilt is made profitable—increasing indefinitely as capital expands.

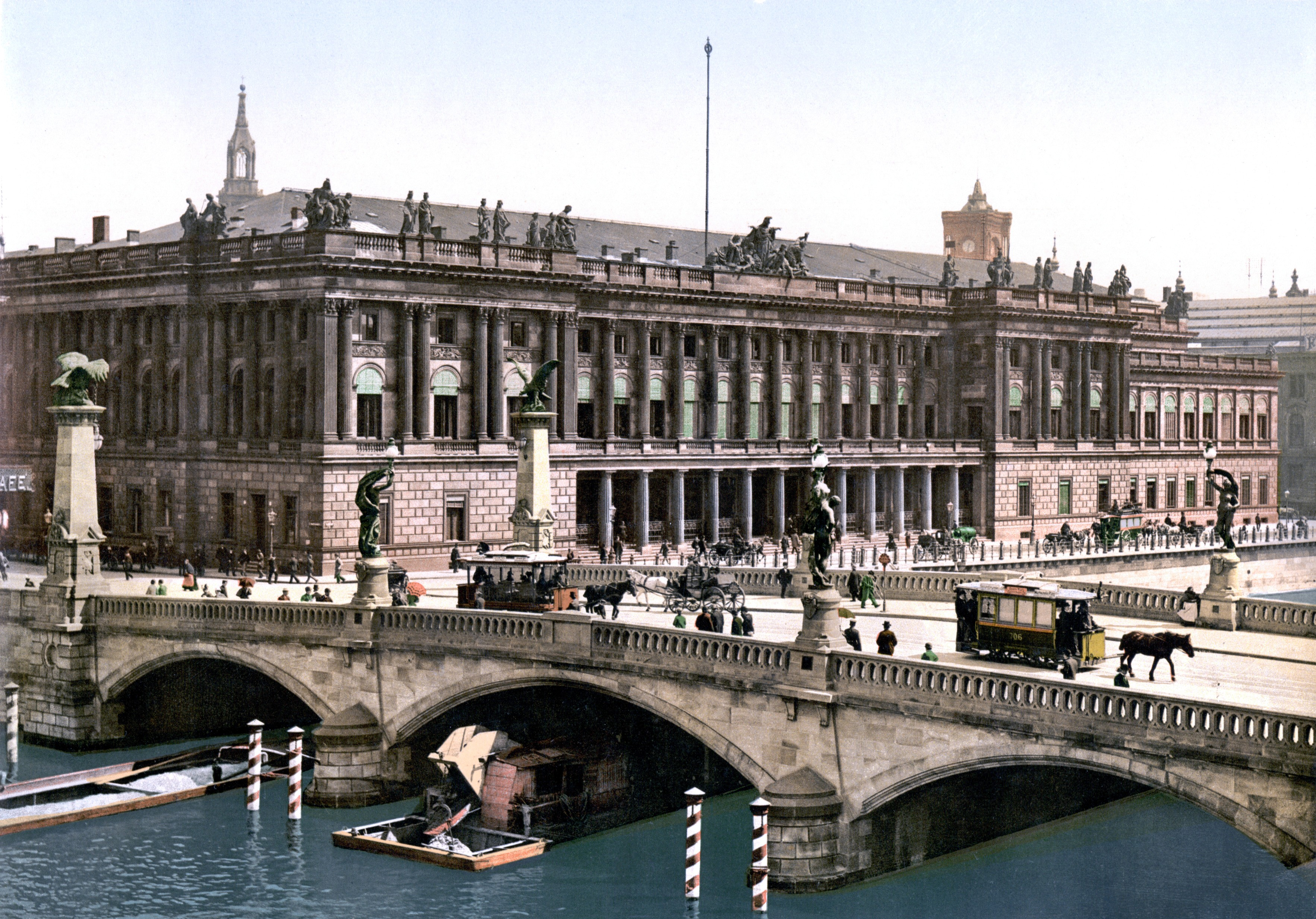
Berlin Stock Exchange, about 1900

According to William Rasch, in the absence of theology or dogma, capitalism unifies society through a universal and inescapable logic of guilt and duty. Duty is not chosen, but arises structurally, as a function of indebtedness. For Ross, guilt becomes capitalism’s founding principle, the inverse of profit: capital not only exploits labor, but subsumes consciousness, time, and desire under the imperative of repayment. Unlike the Christian God, who could forgive, capitalism recognizes no creditor and no debtor—only guilt. As Benjamin shows in his reading of Kafka, guilt no longer derives from transgression or divine will; it arises from the inscrutable logic of the system itself, as exemplified in The Trial, where Josef K. is guilty without cause or resolution.

Guilt in capitalism is not only personal or ethical—it is historical. In Hamacher’s reading, the capitalist system synchronizes all time under the sign of guilt, eliminating historical experience in favor of causal determinism. Time becomes static and repetitive, echoing the logic of myth. In this view, Christianity and capitalism are not opposites but successive stages in a religion of guilt and duty. Following Hamacher, the Australian philosopher Andrew Benjamin contrasted two modulations of historical time: religion, which, like capitalism, creates subject positions and subordinates the space of experience, and theology, which refers to the messianic interruption of history ("ethical time," in Hamacher's phrase, also identified with political time). Religion, destiny and guilt represent the temporal logic of the endless repetition of the same; this logic is also reproduced in the permanent duration of the capitalist cult.

In Hamacher’s view, guilt is genealogical, grounded in origin (αιτία in Greek), but not mechanistically causal. It is a moral and historical structure, producing lack, failure, and deficiency. As Soosten explains, this total guilt nullifies innocence, hope, and redemption—there is no paradise (past) and no progress (future). Schuld is non-repayable—it cannot be settled, exchanged, or forgiven.

As Alexander Priddat notes, Benjamin links guilt to human impotence in capitalist modernity, echoing Marx’s theory of alienation, but translated into theological terms. In this reading, capitalism is not merely a system of labor exploitation but a historico-theological fall, a “second expulsion from paradise. Unlike the first fall, which introduced work and transformation of nature, the second fall introduces total guilt, no longer anchored in sin but in bourgeois inequality and the severing of society from economy.

=== The guilty God ===
In Walter Benjamin’s theological-political critique of capitalism, the concept of guilt does not merely govern humanity—it implicates and ultimately subordinates even God. The capitalist system, in its "monstrous" (ungeheuren) movement, produces not only an immense consciousness of guilt, but also suspends existence itself, according to S. Weber, leaving us standing over the void. What results is not a mere psychological disturbance, but a Sturz, a cosmic fall—an abyssal collapse in which not only humankind but the entire universe, including the Creator, is caught. In this vision, creation ceases to be God’s creation, ceases to reflect divine image or intention, and instead becomes a closed, unredeemable cycle of guilt and despair. As Hamacher emphasizes, this fall of God is deeper than the fall of Adam: whereas Adam retained a relation to God, God has now fallen away from Himself, entering into a state of apostasy, disunity, loneliness, and despair that renders innocence no longer possible. The divine becomes immanent, entangled within the network of guilt that rules over bare life (bloßes Leben). The collapse of transcendence means that even God is now subject to the law of guilt., As S. Weber notes, referencing Benjamin’s unpublished notes from 1918, this network defines guilt as natural and inevitable, with death as its punishment:

As with most heathen faiths, so with most ideas of natural guilt.

Life is always guilty in one way or another, and its punishment is death.

One form of natural guilt is sexuality as pleasure and the production of life.

Another is money as a mere possibility [bloße Möglichkeit] of existence.

These aphoristic lines define pleasure, reproduction, and economic life itself as forms of natural guilt. Under capitalism, this logic becomes totalizing—even God, like “mere life,” is subject to death. In contrast to religious death that promises resurrection or renewal, the capitalist cult seeks to avoid death, to perpetuate itself indefinitely, and in doing so requires a new anthropological image: man is deified, while God is humanized and stripped of transcendence. According to S. Weber, the capitalist cult requires a “hidden God”, one who is imperfect, immature, and withheld from revelation. This constitutes the fourth characteristic of capitalism, following guilt, permanence, and absence of dogma. God does not appear to forgive or redeem but can only be invoked at the zenith of guilt—at the terminal point of indebtedness and biological life before death.

For Hamacher, this fourth trait of capitalism—the guilt of God himself—is pivotal. It reveals the mystery of God's non-existence, failure, and deferred presence. In this context, God becomes a name not for presence or salvation, but for absence and failure, a mediator of postponement rather than immediacy. As Priddat interprets it, Benjamin inserts a period of deferral, a waiting space before human beings can attain political or spiritual maturity. From a semiotic perspective, Weidner reads the sudden introduction of the hidden God as a formal rupture in the fragment. The original three features of capitalism (permanence, guilt, no dogma) are disrupted by this unexpected fourth, which creates what Michel Riffaterre would call an “ungrammaticality”—a semantic violence against structural expectation. Weidner also draws a parallel between this depiction and Karl Barth’s dialectical theology, particularly the tension between the hidden and revealed God (deus absconditus and deus revelatus). As in Barth, the hidden God in Benjamin’s fragment is not a theological resolution but an open question, reflecting the incoherence and instability of capitalism-as-religion.

As Hamacher summarizes, the thesis of the guilt of God rejects three possible alternatives. The first: within this religion it is impossible to liberate or redeem the system of guilt (despite all the promises), it only constitutes guilt and duty. The second: it is impossible to reform religion; any reform (e.g. Protestant reform), like any social-democratic or socialist policy, must start from something free of guilt, but there is no such element. The third: it is impossible to renounce this cult, because any renunciation would remain within the logic of guilt — it would be an accusation or a guilty verdict. Proclaiming independence from the myth does not get rid of it. Hamacher concludes that liberation is impossible either inside or outside the system.

=== Despair, worries. Capitalism as the ruin of being ===
The structural consequence of capitalism’s universal system of guilt and debt is a condition of despair and loneliness. Following the "accusation of God," capitalism culminates in a "world state of despair", which Benjamin describes as the religious condition of the modern world. In this system, absolute despair becomes the prevailing mode of existence, and any hope for liberation is redirected back into despair itself. As Hamacher notes, this condition reflects broader historical and philosophical influences: the emotional desolation produced by Calvinism (Weber), the anguish of conscience driven by ascetic ideals (Nietzsche), and existential despair as articulated by Kierkegaard). While Nietzsche viewed religion as a kind of sick medicine, for Benjamin capitalism is the sickness itself, one that leads directly to despair.

Benjamin connects this state of despair to Weber’s "iron cage", where capitalism appears inescapable, irresistible as fate. He employs an astrological metaphor—humanity passing through the "house" of despair—drawing from Nietzsche’s imagery of the overman, the eternal return, and the celestial logic of cycles. (Note: In astrology, houses denote the position of the planets.) (Note: As Priddat writes, Martin Heidegger was addressing Nietzsche in a similar way in his “Letter on Humanism” when he used the metaphor of rotation to describe the lack of reflection in thinking about human existence.) In Priddat’s reading, capitalism introduces a new dimension of alienation: man is estranged both from God and from himself. The cyclical motion implies that while despair is only one phase, the path remains solitary. S. Weber further emphasizes that loneliness is not individual, but part of a broader constellation—a structural and relational condition.

This universal guilt, combined with despair and the loss of transcendence, produces an unprecedented situation: religion no longer reforms being—it destroys it. Benjamin identifies this as a radical break, a fragmentation of existence ("Zertrümmerung"), whereby capitalism dismembers being, transforming it into ruins. Capitalism replaces being with having, human qualities with commodity forms, and moral values with monetary ones (Löwy). Though not developed fully in the fragment, this critique aligns with the views of contemporary anti-capitalist thinkers in Benjamin's orbit, such as Landauer, Sorel, and Müller. This imagery anticipates Benjamin’s Thesis IX in On the Concept of History, where the “pile of ruins” (Trümmern) is not human progress, but capitalism as a religious catastrophe (Bolz).

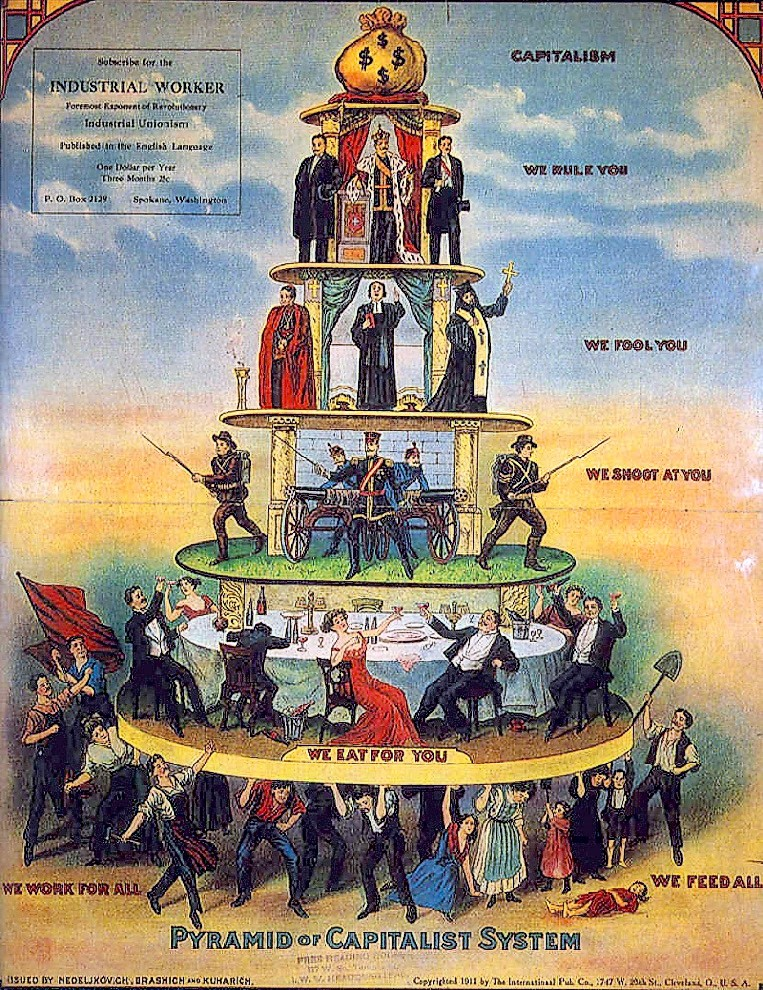
"Pyramid of Capitalist System". Famous cartoon from the American trade union newspaper of the IWW "Industrial Worker" (1911)

The aesthetic dimension of this decay corresponds to Benjamin’s theory of allegory in The Origin of German Tragic Drama, where ruin is the natural state of history. Yet, in his soteriological thought, decay may contain within it the possibility of redemption (One-Way Street"). As Hamacher suggests, the destruction of being may paradoxically open the possibility of history itself.

Toward the end of the fragment, Benjamin refers to “indications” of guilt that manifest as “worries”—not individual anxieties, but deeply social symptoms of a shared historical and existential condition. According to Witte, these concerns reflect a collective psychology, where endless economic activity becomes a way of evading the finitude of human aspiration. Yet, Benjamin ultimately concludes that individual spiritual practices are powerless against capitalism’s religious structure; collective solutions are blocked by the cult itself (Löwy). As S. Weber points out, Benjamin does not define "worries" at the outset. Their content emerges from capitalism’s operation: by universalizing guilt, capitalism generates “worries, torments, and anxieties” while eliminating alternatives—whether a transcendent God or a different social order. Initially broader in scope, “worries” are appropriated by capitalism, becoming both the individual's burden and proof of their indebtedness. Thus, debt-as-guilt perpetually reproduces the very "indications" of its own necessity.

This thesis of worries as signs of guilt recalls Heidegger’s analysis in Being and Time, where guilt is not moral but ontological, inherent to human existence. According to Heidegger's formulation, primordial guilt "lies in the being of presence as such". Benjamin’s “man of worries” stands in contrast to the “destructive character”, who always sees a way forward. This echoes Heidegger’s contrast between “care” (Sorge)—the existential structure of Dasein—and the everyday concealment of authentic being. Both Heidegger and Benjamin draw on Augustine’s notion of non posse non peccare ("not able not to sin"). Yet, while Heidegger sees freedom in the understanding of guilt, Benjamin envisions a possible cessation of guilt itself.

=== The god of money, the god of capital ===
Walter Benjamin does not explicitly name the hidden god that replaces the Judeo-Christian God in the capitalist cult. However, many commentators agree that for Benjamin, this deity is money. As Soosten observes, Benjamin draws on a long tradition of religious critique of money, dating back to the Old Testament story of the golden calf, where idolatry replaces monotheism. (Note: As Soosten notes, the parallel between God and money is a rather late phenomenon; in the Middle Ages, money was understood in a rigid and substantialist way, with Aristotle and Thomas Aquinas's formula "money does not give birth to money" ("Nummus non parit nummos"). A similarity in form between God and money appears in the nominalism of the 14th and 15th centuries (in this sense, Soosten notes, a revision of Weber's thesis is long overdue) and is affirmed in Calvinism — money acquires the functions of God insofar as it gains power over future possibilities, power over time; Calvin rejected Aquinas's thought".) In this framework, money is framed in religious terms, a position supported by the fragment’s bibliography, which references figures like Sorel, Adam Müller, and Landauer, all of whom described capital or money as a guilty, accusatory god. This line of thought aligns with Marx, Nietzsche, and Georg Simmel, whom Fredric Jameson calls Benjamin’s “intellectual precursor". Steiner also identifies a reference to Pluto, the Greek god of wealth, via Goethe’s Faust, where Faust, in Pluto’s mask, creates paper money—a symbol of debt over value.

Marx, in his 1844 Notes on James Mill, compares money to Christ—as both alienated god and alienated man. (Note: Published in 1932.) In capitalism, the intermediary becomes the true god, and its cult an end in itself. In later works, Marx identifies money as capital in motion, equating it with power, wealth, and divinity. Nietzsche, meanwhile, describes God as a divine creditor, who owes only to himself in order to exist—a formulation that resonates with the self-referential logic of capital (Hamacher). Landauer’s critique is direct: money becomes a devouring deity, at once artificial and alive, not generating wealth but being wealth itself. Soosten notes that for Landauer (and possibly Benjamin), even the rich are mere functions of money, as it erases class distinctions, replacing them with universal debt and “immortal” money".

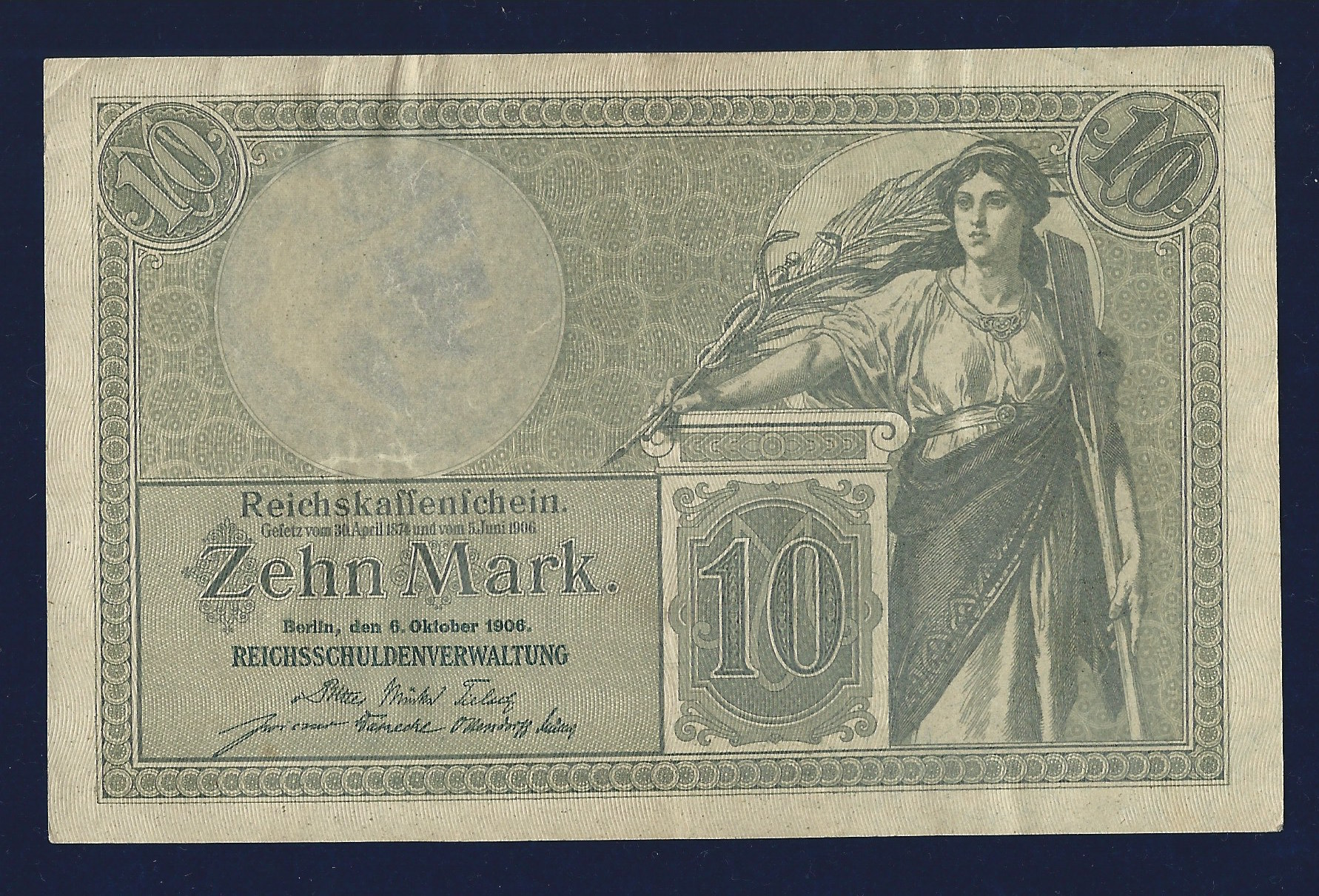
Early 20th century German banknotes

Simmel, in The Philosophy of Money (1900), analyzes how money penetrates all spheres of life, rationalizes society, and assumes the functions of religion: uniting the material and spiritual, subsuming space, time, and value itself. For Simmel, capitalism deepens social divisions, while for Benjamin, it re-sacralizes money in a cultic framework. Keynes, without knowledge of Benjamin, similarly wrote that money offers security against the future, thus fulfilling a religious role. He warned that its idolatry—notably through "liquidity preference"—leads to speculation, high interest rates, and unemployment.

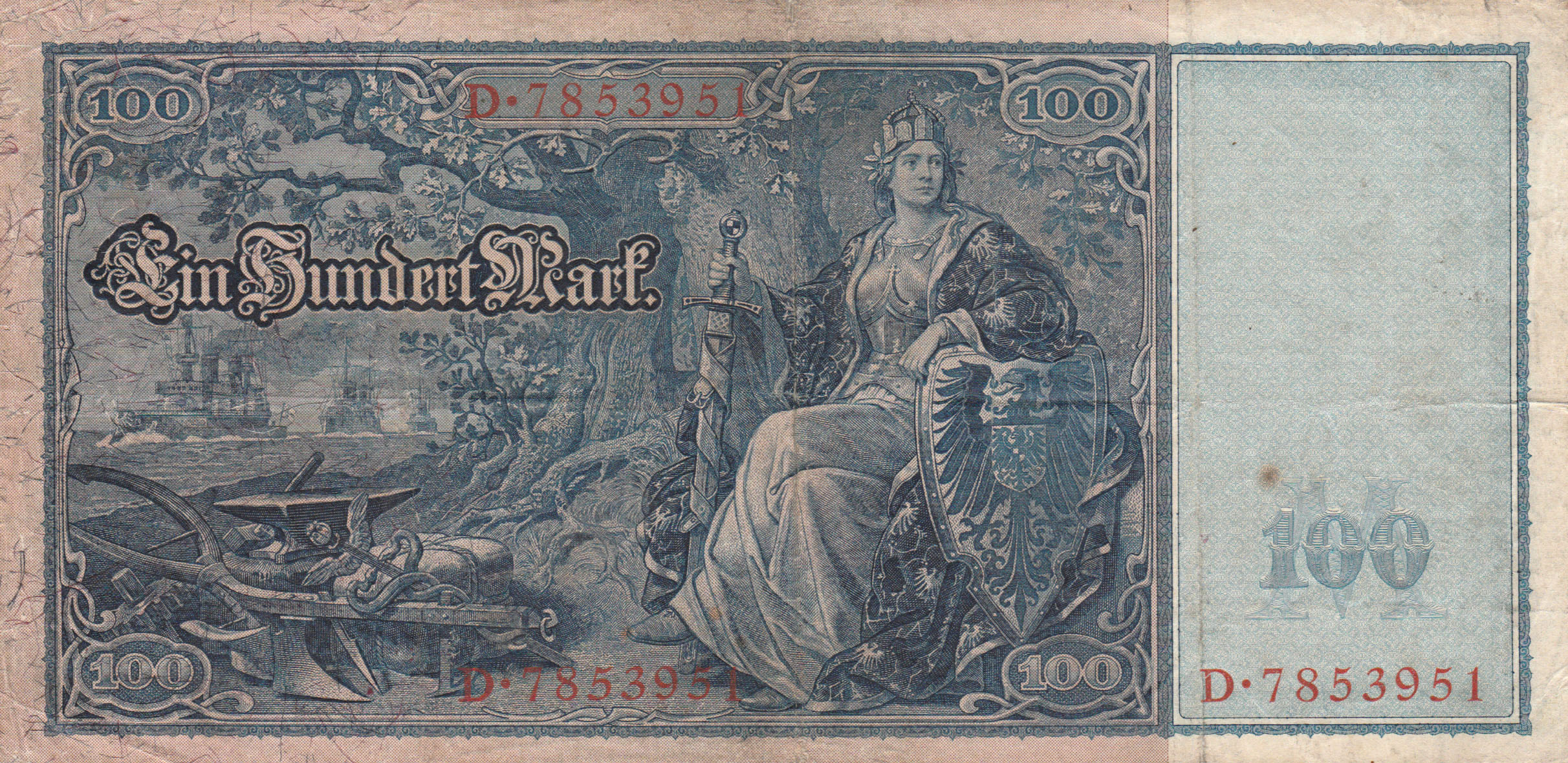
Early 20th century German banknotes

Benjamin reinforces this interpretation by inviting a comparison between icons of saints in traditional religions and the ornamentation of banknotes. As Löwy notes, money assumes the status of cultic image, its design reflecting a new mythology. Benjamin writes of a “spirit” speaking through the decoration of money—a capitalist spirit, distinct from the transcendent promise of religious icons. In One-Way Street, this reappears: banknotes are treated with “sacred seriousness”, resembling the “façade of the underworld”, an allusion to Dante's "Inferno and Marx’s critique of capitalist exploitation.

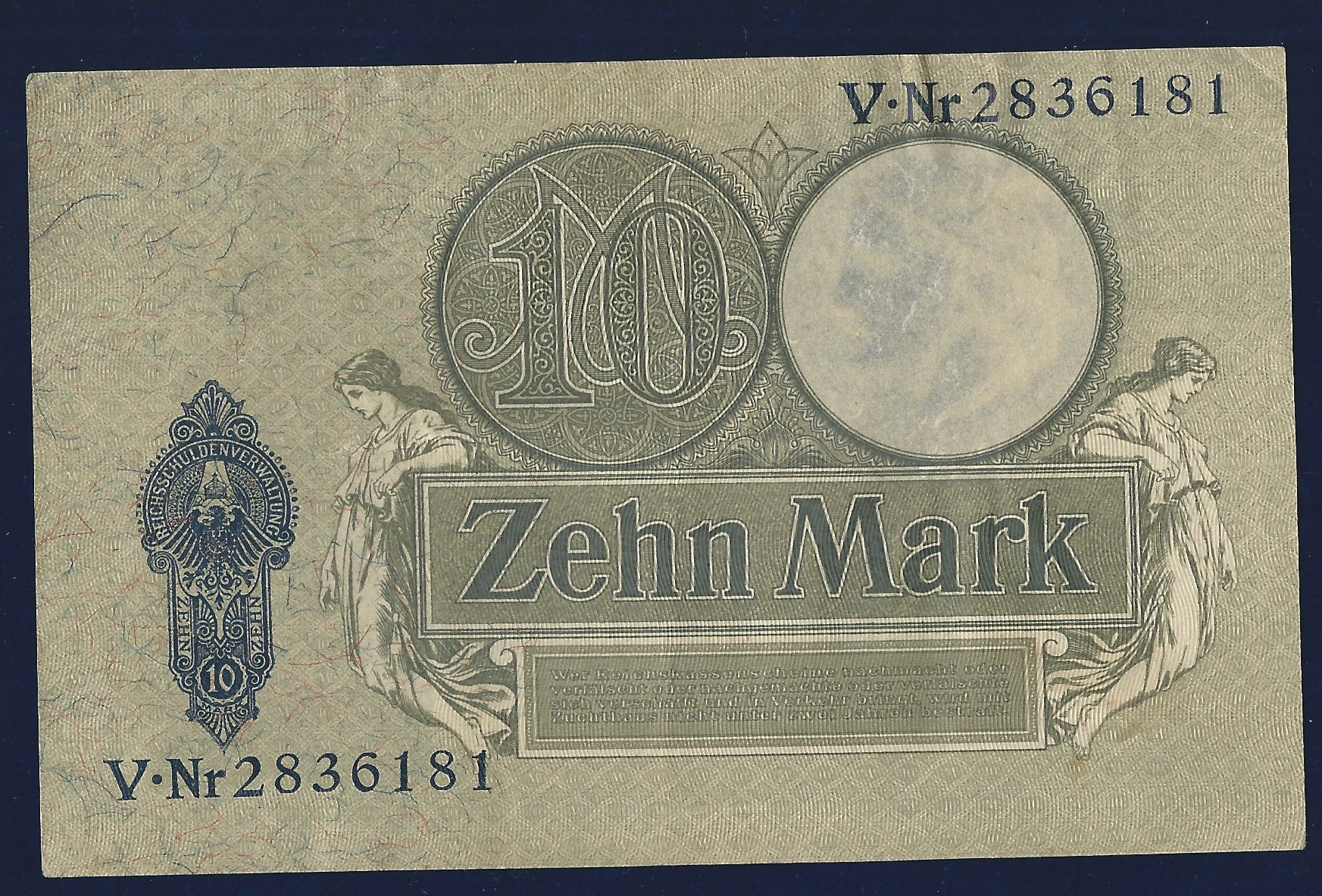
Early 20th century German banknotes

Marx’s Capital (especially Chapter 24) frames primitive accumulation in theological terms, showing how surplus value and credit arise from unpaid labor, colonialism, and violence. (Note: Marx is known to have made frequent use of biblical metaphors.) This process resembles creation ex nihilo: capital arises from nothing but debt, producing itself endlessly from its own unpayable credit. As Ponzi notes, Marx parallels original sin with the foundational injustice of capitalism, exposing the myth of the “thrifty elect” and the “lazy poor”.

Capitalism becomes a vicious circle: credit-debt cycles reproduce indefinitely, severed from real value. According to Hamacher, this culminates in the “faith of capital”—not belief in something real, but a self-referential belief in its own divinity, where capital owes itself to itself in order to exist. Whether Benjamin had read Capital’s Chapter 24 is unclear, but Steiner suggests he may have encountered it through Sorel, whose Reflections on Violence develops a similar theology of primordial accumulation.

=== "The three priests of capitalism": Freud, Nietzsche, Marx ===
Walter Benjamin refers to Freud, Nietzsche, and Marx as the “three priests” of capitalism-as-religion. While this grouping may seem unexpected, their work reflects the religious structure of capitalism, which they each critique from within, yet also unwittingly replicate. Paul Ricoeur's designation of these thinkers as the "masters of suspicion" supports Benjamin’s view of them as theorists of modernity who, despite their critical aims, systematize the capitalist cult rather than transcend it.

Freud's psychoanalysis parallels capitalist religion through its central concept of repression, (Note: According to Scholem's memory, Benjamin spoke disparagingly of Freud's theory of instincts at one of the seminars (1917/1918), where he gave a report on that subject.) which he calls a foundational mechanism of the psyche. In Totem and Taboo, Freud locates the origins of society, morality, and religion in Urschuld (original guilt)—the murder of the primal father. Religion, in this view, is a ritualized response to repressed guilt. (Note: Freud concluded in Totem and Taboo: "Society is now based on complicity in a jointly committed crime, religion on consciousness of guilt and remorse, morality partly on the needs of this society, partly on the remorse demanded by the consciousness of guilt".) Benjamin sees this framework as complicit in capitalism’s logic: by absolutizing guilt, Freud’s theory cannot liberate humanity but rather confirms its endless indebtedness. The economic dimension of psychoanalysis thus aligns it with the capitalist cult of guilt and duty.

The analogy between repression (Freud) and capital (Marx), Benjamin writes, is structural. Both involve self-reproducing processes that operate through concealment and growth. Repressed content and surplus value are alike in that they cannot be directly represented, yet exert real effects. Hamacher points to Pluto—god of the underworld and wealth—as a symbolic fusion of the unconscious and prosperity.

Freud himself noted Nietzsche’s influence, seeing the father figure of human prehistory as akin to Nietzsche’s Übermensch. Benjamin’s reading of Nietzsche is ambivalent. While Nietzsche’s elitism and individualism contrast with Benjamin’s political orientation, Nietzsche’s nihilism and critique of morality are central to the fragment. (Note: It's a critique of the constant resurgence of blame and guilt as an internally negative and nihilistic madness that denies humanity's vital instincts and creates an irrational and fundamentally nihilistic and purposeless system closed in on itself.)

Nietzsche’s Zarathustra becomes the ultimate figure of capitalist religiosity. The Übermensch does not seek redemption but embraces hubris and steigerung—a concept Benjamin uses to describe both the increase of capital and the escalation of guilt. Rather than resolve guilt, Nietzsche’s figure intensifies it, echoing capitalism’s logic of infinite growth and domination.

Benjamin interprets Nietzsche’s project as a metaphysical extension of capitalism, in which the Übermensch replaces God and sanctifies immanence and expansion. Though some, like Derrida, view Nietzsche’s Übermensch as a dancer who escapes metaphysics, Benjamin sees him as the apotheosis of capitalist religion.

Marx’s theory, too, is seen by Benjamin as entangled in capitalist logic. Although Marx criticizes capitalism as a system of unpaid labor and surplus value, his vision of socialism as capitalism’s successor inscribes it in the same trajectory. Socialism, according to Benjamin, does not escape the debt structure of capitalism but inherits it, collecting “interest” on its guilt. Even revolution cannot absolve this debt, because humanity itself remains immature—an “immature god” trapped in a cycle of guilt and hubris. Palaver, drawing on René Girard, suggests Benjamin views socialism as part of a universal scapegoating mechanism: the expropriation of the ruling class becomes a pagan sacrifice, promising a secular paradise through violence. González Faus notes, however, that Benjamin’s critique of Marx is the weakest of the three, as Marx himself described capital as apocalyptic in Capital. (Note: Marx quoted the revelation of the Evangelist John: "They have one mind, and will give their power and authority to the beast." (Rev. 17:13), "...and that no man should be bought or sold, save he that hath the mark, or the name of the beast, or the number of his name" (Rev. 13:17).)

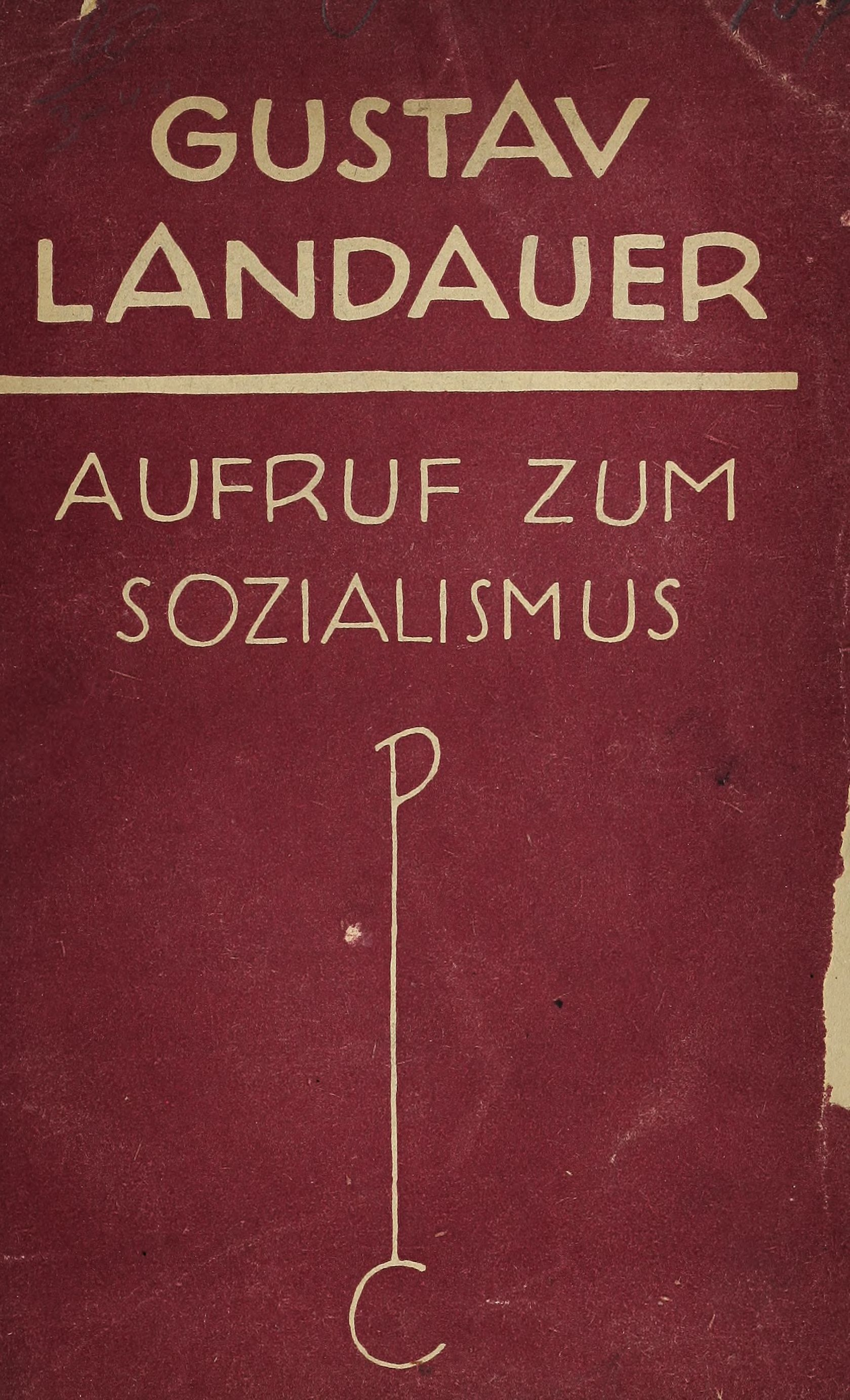
“A Call to Socialism,” G. Landauer, 1919

Benjamin’s position echoes the religious anarchism of Gustav Landauer, who criticized Marxism as an extension of capitalism, calling it “a paper flower on capitalism’s favorite thorn bush". While Benjamin's early stance was skeptical of Marx, his later work was influenced by Lukács’ History and Class Consciousness, which deepened his engagement with Marxist theory. According to Steiner and Weber, Benjamin's critique aligns with Weber’s view that socialism and capitalism are structurally similar, both rooted in the rationalization of labor unique to the West. Socialism, too, becomes a form of secularized religious rationality, not a genuine rupture.

=== Umkehr, salvation and the limit of capitalism ===
Walter Benjamin offers no explicit pathway for escaping capitalism, and interpretations of his stance vary. In his fragment Capitalism as Religion, he alludes only vaguely to "waiting for healing." Central to the possibility of overcoming capitalism is the concept of Umkehr—a turning, reversal, or conversion—used three times in the text but never fully defined. The term Umkehr draws on multiple sources. Nietzsche uses Umkehrung in On the Genealogy of Morals to describe the slave morality's reversal of values, while the German Romantic poet Hölderlin and the anarchist Gustav Landauer use it in more spiritual and political senses. Landauer, in particular, described socialism as conversion, a spiritual renewal preceding social change—a return to authentic human relations and nature. Although Benjamin may not have shared Landauer's idealization of nature, he likely borrowed the term from him. In this framework, Umkehr implies a radical break with the logic of Steigerung (growth, escalation), which characterizes capitalism.

Benjamin’s indirect engagement with thinkers like Unger and Sorel also informs interpretations of Umkehr. Unger proposed an exodus from capitalism, rather than direct opposition, which only reinforces the system. Sorel, in turn, critiqued bourgeois institutions while promoting the myth of the general strike as a revolutionary rupture.

Benjamin’s own sympathies at the time leaned toward anarchism, as reflected in his favorable comments on Unger's "metaphysical anarchism" and engagement with Sorel. However, unlike Unger, Benjamin locates the potential break not in spatial movement (migration), but in eschatological temporality—a messianic interruption of history.

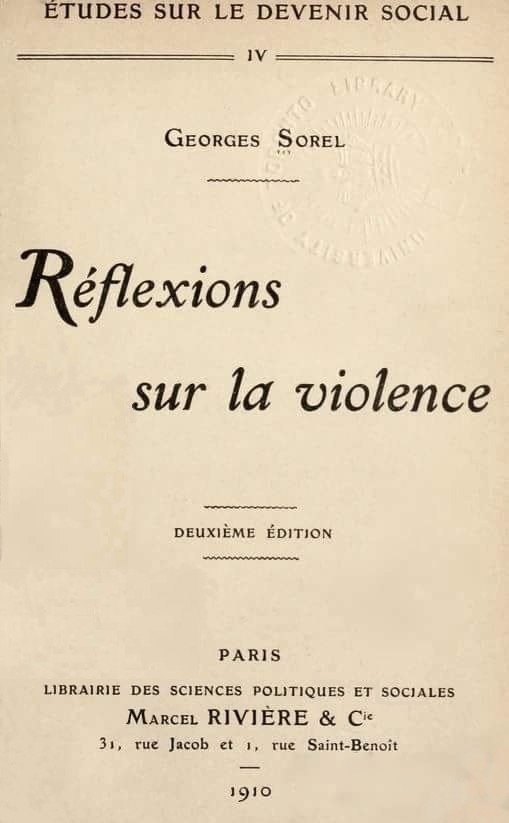
“Reflections on Violence,” J. Sorel, 1910

Benjamin uses Umkehr to criticize Nietzsche, Freud, and Marx for remaining within the logic of capitalist escalation. For some scholars (e.g., Steiner), Umkehr represents a profane, political rupture, a new beginning beyond capitalism’s guilt-debt system. It is not a return to religion, but a form of secular redemption grounded in action rather than faith. This interpretation aligns Umkehr with Sorel’s general strike, as described in Benjamin’s Critique of Violence: a political break with mythical violence and the logic of retribution that defines capitalism. Others emphasize the religious dimension of Umkehr—as conversion, repentance, or metanoia. Hamacher and Priddat understand it as a rupture with guilt, a re-volutio, or crisis. Benjamin offers two implicit alternatives: a Marxist revolution, which he suggests is futile; or Umkehr, a movement away from growth toward radical change.

According to Soosten, Benjamin proposes an alternative to Nietzsche’s superhuma: not expansion, but deceleration, even annihilation. Liberation, in this view, stems from forgetting and destroying the fallen world rather than remembering. Bolz reads Umkehr as an amalgam of repentance, purification, revolution, and the end of history.

Benjamin links salvation to universal despair, suggesting that healing arises only from the depths of ruin. According to Weidner, the messianic dynamic emerges when capitalism exhausts itself—the totalization of guilt leads to collapse, and God reappears as the final apocalyptic reversal. (Note: As Weidner writes, in the notes to "One-way Street", Benjamin specified the apocalyptic “logic of disclosure”: “Having forgotten to reveal its mechanisms, capitalism will collapse”.) However, Benjamin rejects teleological views shared by Nietzsche and Marx, in which liberation follows despair. For him, such beliefs remain trapped in religious logic, expecting salvation as a reward for suffering. In contrast, he detaches despair from redemption; their connection is not guaranteed.

Ryklin argues that Benjamin sees no political solution: capitalism is so total that only God—negatively conceived—can redeem humanity. Yet this is not the God of doctrine, but one who returns precisely in man's inability to bear guilt alone. What happens when this God returns remains unclear.

According to Hamacher and Mormann, Benjamin hints at a post-capitalist time, but without defining its content. His critique is ethical and apolitical; the cost of methodological precision is a refusal to offer programmatic solutions. Rush sees only one hope: the total destruction of the world through divine violence. Hamacher sees in Benjamin’s thought a paradox: the judgment that capitalism passes on itself is already embedded in its structure. Forgiveness, therefore, has always been latent in history—present as the counterpart to guilt, though never actualized.

In this light, Umkehr is not repentance in a moral sense, but the reversal of guilt itself—a movement ex nihilo, akin to Cohen’s logic of pure knowledge, where the annihilation of guilt is the annihilation of the mythical economy of debt. In this reversal, capitalism turns back to its source, making way for a messianic time of forgiveness and non-guilt. (Note: Heidegger's word from "Being and Time".) Hamacher concludes with a radical formulation: God, at the apex of the capitalist cult, is guilty before himself. He lacks completion, is not yet God—his guilt is the source of nothingness, and thus he is not cause or guilt, but the insignificant cause of emptiness. The self-annihilation of guilt thus becomes the hidden logic of history.

== History of researches ==
Walter Benjamin’s fragment Capitalism as Religion was first published posthumously in 1985 in Volume VI of his Gesammelte Schriften (Suhrkamp Verlag), where it appeared as "Fragment 74" alongside a diverse selection of texts largely unrelated to his major works. Initially, the publication attracted little attention. The first significant scholarly engagement came from Norbert Bolz (1989), who examined the fragment in the context of Max Weber’s legacy, treating it as an independent contribution rather than a marginal note. Bolz outlined its historical-philosophical implications and later (2000; 2003) applied Benjamin’s insights to modern phenomena such as marketing and advertising, though he dismissed the fragment’s political-theological dimension as outdated. A philological analysis was undertaken by Hermann Schweppenhäuser (1992), while Uwe Steiner (1998, 2003) situated the fragment within Benjamin’s broader reflections on philosophy and politics. Steiner was the first to emphasize the depth and systematic scope of Benjamin’s considerations in the fragment.

For years, scholarly discussion remained confined to Benjamin specialists. In 1996, the fragment was translated into English and published by Harvard University Press in Selected Writings, Vol. 1, marking a turning point in its international reception. From the early 2000s, interest expanded across disciplines—German studies, cultural theory, philosophy, sociology, and economics. A key moment in the fragment’s reception was the 2003 publication of the anthology Kapitalismus als Religion (Kulturverlag Kadmos, ed. Dirk Baecker), which brought together both academic studies and interpretative essays contextualizing the text philosophically and historically. In 2005, Giorgio Agamben's discussion of the fragment in Profanations gave it further prominence, helping to catalyze broader international interest. Other interpretations include Werner Hamacher's (2002) analysis of the underlying category of guilt, Samuel Weber's (2008) detailed examination of the fragment, and several works by Michael Löwy (2006; 2010; etc.). In 2014, a collective of Italian scholars published The Cult of Capital, further deepening the interdisciplinary discussion.

The fragment has since been translated into English, French, Italian, Spanish, Portuguese, Russian, Swedish, and Danish, with various unofficial translations—particularly in Spanish—circulating online.

In 2008, the fragment became the focus of a multidisciplinary conference entitled Capitalism as Religion? hosted by the National Centre for Contemporary Arts in Moscow, organized by Russian art critics, philosophers, and political activists.

== Perceptions and critics ==
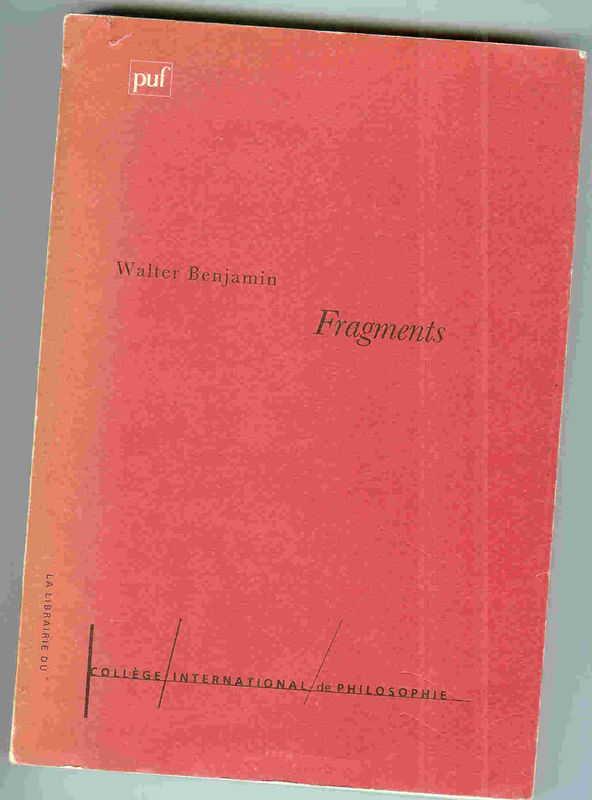
Cover of the 2000 French edition, in which the excerpt was included

The "religious turn" in late 20th- and early 21st-century philosophy and social science, which challenged classical theories of secularization and reasserted the centrality of religion in modern life, shaped the reception of Benjamin’s Capitalism as Religion. (Note: In Weidner's assessment, religion almost disappeared from the academic agenda in the 1980s, in part due to theoretical shifts toward deconstruction, postcolonialism, and discourse analysis, although debates about secularization took place in the 1960s and 1970s. Weidner notes that classical conceptions of secularization in the first half of the twentieth century were more complex than they might seem and were not limited to the "loss of the sacred".) Benjamin analyzed modernity by deconstructing dominant myths such as progress, which he viewed not as false in itself, but as ideologically loaded and historically constructed. His critique led him to describe capitalism as a religion — perhaps “the most radical religion” — founded on guilt and debt, endlessly reproducing itself through cycles of accumulation.

The fragment resists systematic interpretation. It presents a constellation of concepts — guilt, hopelessness, destruction, healing — that lack linear coherence. Benjamin develops his thesis through observations and aphorisms, rather than structured argument. Economist and theologian Friedhelm Hengsbach notes that Benjamin’s ideas scatter like sparks, defying precise interpretation. As S. Weber observes, the text remains forever incomplete. According to Baecker, its fragmentary and ambiguous nature is precisely what makes it compelling — its openness invites multiple interpretations, though it poses challenges for translation and coherence.

Benjamin’s method combines allegory and symptomatology. As Soosten argues, he seeks not surface analysis but "epiphanies of truth," while also drawing from theological and sociological diagnostics. This dual method risks becoming rigid or dogmatic, subordinating interpretation to an overarching dramaturgy of impending catastrophe.

Due to its late and understated publication, few interpretations existed before 2010. Weidner identifies two main interpretive approaches, exemplified in the 2003 Capitalism as Religion anthology.

The first approach emphasizes the title and treats capitalism as a literal religion. Baecker notes that this collapses the distinction between money and spirit, reflecting modern society’s eroded boundaries between economic and spiritual life. Influenced by Niklas Luhmann's systems theory, this perspective sees capitalism as a functionally differentiated system devoid of ideology. However, critics argue this interpretation neglects Benjamin’s messianism and the essentialist critiques typical of critical theory. As Steiner points out, many contributors in this camp aimed to offer an alternative to Weber’s analysis of modernity.

The second approach situates the fragment within Benjamin’s broader corpus. Commentators link it to the Theses on the Philosophy of History (Löwy), to the Arcades Project (Schöttker), and to Benjamin’s later historical-political concepts such as constellation and discontinuity (Bolz). Yet Weidner warns that this method risks overextending — making the fragment stand in for all of Benjamin’s thinking, while simultaneously becoming overly hermeneutic and citation-heavy. Salzani adds that the increased attention to the fragment reflects the commodification of Benjamin studies itself — a trend Benjamin might have criticized as the “cult of capitalism” within academia.

Two main aspects of the criticism can be distinguished. First, the comparison between capitalism and religion seems to be an exaggeration or even a deliberate distortion. As Hengsbach suggests, the use of the word "religion" is by no means justified: Benjamin cannot prove the religious nature of capitalism, but only avoids a "comprehensive polemic. His method is based on the overuse of analogies, allegories, and critical metaphors (e.g., the allegorical association of money with Christian soteriology). Analogies show the differences between phenomena rather than their similarities, so Benjamin uses the method of comparison unsuccessfully: the definitions of capitalism and religion remain extremely blurred, as does the relationship between them, defined by the vague notion of Verschuldung. Benjamin does not unfold a clear line of argument: metaphors belonging to the sphere of religion are transformed without internal justification into "socio-philosophical, theological-dogmatic assertions. Images of saints in non-Christian religions, Hengsbach argues, have nothing to do with the emergence of capitalism; the banknotes of the first nation-states did not depict Christian saints, but ancient goddesses of luck and symbols of fertility.

Second, the text's false, narrow understanding of religion, which overlooks essential aspects of religious experience, is also criticized. Religion is defined exclusively as a cult aimed at salvation. However, Hengsbach objects, Christianity is not reduced to a cult — to silent rituals and symbolic actions, but always includes explanation, interpretation and reflection[288]. Moreover, religion is exclusively associated with human vice. Guilt becomes a total network with no outlet: guilt does not result from individual irresponsible mistakes, but from the collective fate of humanity - the original finitude of man. This approach, Hengsbach notes, excludes the possibility of historical action as well as individual responsibility and political resistance.

Benjamin’s views on secularization also provoke debate. Rush, drawing on Agamben, suggests Benjamin envisions emancipation through a return to a pre-theological condition — a world before gods and guilt. In this reading, secularization becomes not the end of history but its negation, and redemption is possible only through radical destruction.

Some critics argue that Benjamin’s ideas are difficult to apply to contemporary capitalism, which differs markedly from the early 20th-century context. As Priddat notes, Benjamin's concept reflects Marxian capitalism, not today's global neoliberal system. The notion of guilt is tied to theological Marxism and early 20th-century eschatology (Sorel, Bloch, Lukács), which no longer resonate with current discourse. Others see Benjamin’s God of the economy in the tradition of Enlightenment-era critiques of bourgeois society and aesthetic transcendence.

Nevertheless, some scholars maintain that Benjamin’s theological-political framework remains insightful for analyzing modern culture and communication. Baecker argues that capitalism, more than ever, functions as a religion: (Note: Among others, this was pointed out by Carl Schmitt, who believed that socialism had the same meaning in the 19th-20th centuries as Christianity had for two millennia.) after the fall of socialism, capitalism has become the last utopia, the dominant discourse, and the only horizon of meaning. Modern society, Baecker writes, sees capitalism as its destiny. Capitalist values thus acquire religious significance. Yet critics contend that neoliberal capitalism, which conceals coercion behind the illusion of freedom, lacks core religious features like forgiveness or redemption.

Despite its ambiguities, the fragment continues to fascinate. Philosopher Stefano Micali calls the text "hypnotic," while Agamben considers it one of Benjamin’s most profound posthumous works. Löwy and Lindner affirm its ongoing relevance, especially in light of global crises such as 9/11. Weidner suggests that while the fragment offers few direct answers, it raises urgent questions about how we interpret modernity. Salzani frames its relevance in Benjamin’s own terms: each moment in history offers a unique constellation in which the past can be read anew.

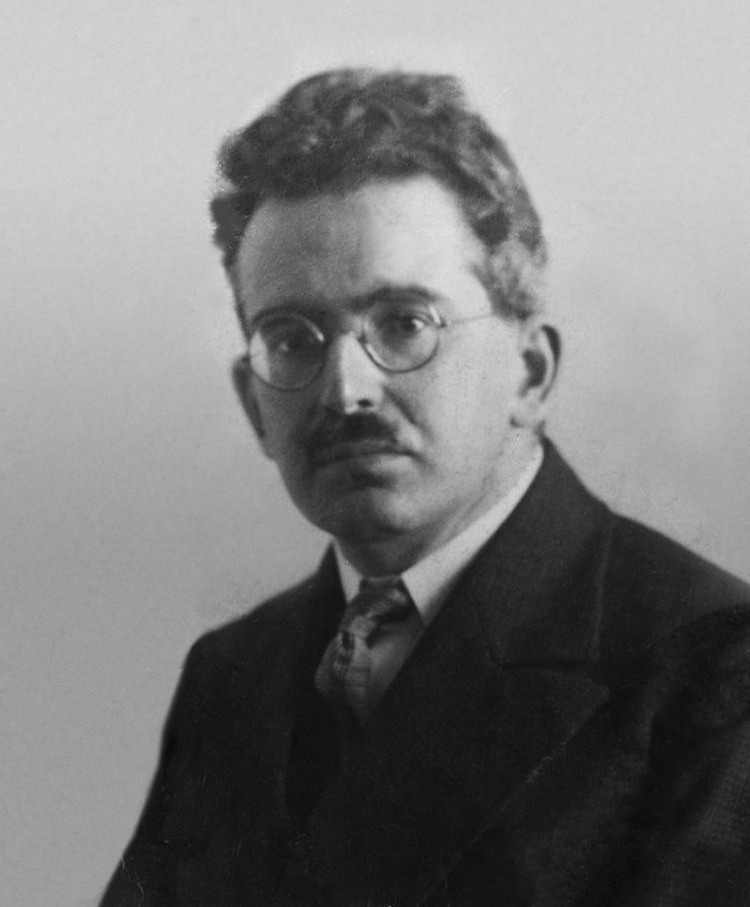
Walter Benjamin in 1928

Benjamin’s holistic approach — viewing capitalism as permeating all aspects of life — has also been contested. Critics such as Luhmann and Habermas argue that capitalism is only one functional system among many, not a total structure. Bolz notes that modern society’s search for unity often leads to esoteric or theological metaphors, which fail to provide accurate external critiques of society. Radical criticism, he argues, risks becoming theology in disguise. He sees Benjamin’s messianism as belonging to a specific historical-philosophical context, no longer applicable today.

Other theorists, however, offer counterarguments. Soosten, invoking Luhmann, points to the symbolic differentiation between money and God, which undercuts Benjamin’s thesis. Bourdieu, conversely, supports Benjamin’s idea of capital as a transcendental structure, shaping even domains far removed from the economy. Robert Kurz connects the fragment to the Frankfurt School’s critique of capital as a metaphysical a priori — the "fetish of capital" — thus rejecting Bolz’s limited interpretation.

Some link Benjamin’s critique to Keynes, who also condemned the idolization of money and advocated state intervention to humanize capitalism. Christoph Deutschmann offers a modern take: capitalist myths, unlike religious ones, are cyclical and constantly reinvented. Because capitalism dissolves the distinction between the transcendent and the immanent, its cultic nature is expressed through perpetual boundary-shifting — a process of "creative destruction" in Schumpeter’s terms. In this sense, the capitalist cult remains enduring.

== Ideas' development ==
=== Theological economy and profanation: Agamben ===
Giorgio Agamben significantly develops the thesis of capitalism’s religious nature, building on Benjamin's fragment. Agamben situates modern capitalism within a broader theological genealogy, arguing that after the "death of God," modernity found its culmination in the total economization and biopolitical control of life — all encompassed within what he terms the theological economy. Although Agamben directly comments on Benjamin’s fragment only briefly — in Profanations (2005) and a 2013 article — his major work Kingdom and Glory: Toward a Theological Genealogy of Economy and Government (2007) offers a comprehensive and nuanced elaboration of Benjamin's thesis.

Agamben traces the roots of modern economic rationality to Christian theology, particularly the concept of oikonomia (household management), which underlies Trinitarian dogma and differentiates Christianity from Judaism. For Agamben, Benjamin’s idea of capitalism as a parasite on Christianity is not merely metaphorical but reveals the deeper theological foundations of the modern economic order. In Agamben’s view, capitalism fully realized its religious form when U.S. President Richard Nixon abolished the gold standard (1971). Detaching money from both sovereign authority and material backing (gold), currency became abstract, self-referential, and purely faith-based — a perverse theological entity. Drawing on the Apostle Paul's formulation that "faith is the substance of things hoped for" (Hebrews 11:1), Agamben argues that credit has replaced religious faith in the capitalist cult.

Agamben also draws on Michel Foucault’s concept of the dispositif (apparatus) to interpret capitalism as a structure that universalizes guilt and captures all spheres of life. In Profanations, he claims that Benjamin’s fragment reveals a central dispositif of modern society — one in which the boundaries between the sacred and the profane become blurred and unstable. As Christianity begins to internalize sacrifice — making God the object of sacrifice — the distinction between human and divine collapses. Capitalism radicalizes this process, extending it to all domains of life:

Capitalism, taking to the extreme a tendency already present in Christianity, extends to all spheres and absolutizes in them the structure of isolation that defines every religion. Where sacrifice meant the transition from the profane to the sacred and from the sacred to the profane, there is now a single, multiple and endless process of isolation that embraces every thing, every place, every human activity in order to separate them from themselves, with total indifference to the caesura sacral/profane, divine/human.

This endless process of separation leads to what Agamben calls absolute profanation, wherein everything — commodities, language, sexuality — is transformed into a cultic fetish. This dynamic renders things unusable (inoperable) in the original sense: they are no longer accessible for common or everyday use (uso). The resulting culture of spectacle and consumption reflects the triumph of this religious-economic dispositif. Agamben identifies the museum — not the temple — as the contemporary site of sacrifice: a place where objects are removed from life and preserved in sacred detachment.

=== Other approaches ===
Beyond Agamben, several scholars have expanded on Benjamin’s thesis of capitalism as religion from diverse perspectives in sociology, philosophy, and cultural theory. Christoph Deutschmann has developed a detailed interpretation of capitalism’s religious dimension, arguing that existing functionalist definitions of money — as a medium of exchange (economics) or communication (Luhmannian sociology) — fail to capture its deeper essence. Drawing on Benjamin, Simmel, and Marx, Deutschmann sees money not merely as an economic tool but as a symbol of a utopian project. In this view, capitalism transforms money into an “absolute means” (Simmel), enabling humanity to replace God with the pursuit of infinite wealth. For Deutschmann, capitalism is not driven solely by rationalization (as in Weber’s sociology), but by the promise of salvation through capital — a promise that remains unfulfilled. Money in the form of capital becomes a hidden religion, promising redemption from guilt and the realization of human potential. The relentless self-expansion of capital (Marx’s "inexorable movement") traps society in a cultic cycle of accumulation. He concludes:

Benjamin may be right in asserting that after the decline of traditional religions, society has yet to experience a real loss of illusions: the break with capitalist religion.

Norbert Bolz argues that Benjamin's scenario has materialized within modern marketing and advertising. For Bolz, the fragment holds diagnostic rather than critical power — describing, rather than condemning, a market system that ritualizes consumption. In a world disoriented by scientific rationalism and political complexity, cults and rituals — particularly those crafted by advertising — reintroduce meaning and enchantment.

Bolz coins the term “cult marketing”, where brands serve as modern totems and consumption becomes a ritual. Marketing appropriates religious forms — offering "heaven," "eternity," and "freedom" through commodities. Nike store, for example, becomes not just a retail space, but a site of ritual participation. These modern cults, unlike monotheistic religions, are pagan, pluralistic, and brand-driven. According to Bolz, they satisfy the contemporary need for identity and community in an atomized society.

The concept of Schuld (guilt/debt) has been applied to contemporary contexts by Hermann Herlinghaus and others in the anthology Violence without Guilt: Ethical Narratives of the Global South (2008). Using Latin American cultural materials — including narcocorridos, literature, and cinema — contributors explore how capitalism embeds economic, psychological, and legal guilt into social life. Herlinghaus interprets Schuld as a transcendental structure that drives both violence and indebtedness. Modern capitalism, he argues, cannot operate without guilt, which is simultaneously moral burden and economic obligation — reinforcing Benjamin's thesis of a cultic system based on continuous self-reproach.

Australian researcher Martijn Konings engages Benjamin in the context of affective capitalism — examining how emotional investments shape economic behavior. Drawing from Weber and Benjamin, Konings analyzes how capitalism mobilizes belief and desire, rather than rational utility, making emotional and moral engagement central to its functioning.

Philosopher Stefano Micali links Benjamin's analysis of guilt and divinity to modern psychosocial theories, notably those of Alain Ehrenberg, Gilles Deleuze, and Zygmunt Bauman. Ehrenberg, for instance, sees depression as the pathology of a performance-driven society where the individual must embody omnipotence and constant productivity. This secularized godlike self becomes overwhelmed by failure, leading to chronic guilt and anxiety. Deleuze's notion of control societies — where individuals are constantly monitored and expected to learn, adapt, and perform — resonates with Benjamin’s depiction of unrelenting self-surveillance and debt. Bauman’s liquid modernity further underscores themes of instability, isolation, and the erosion of lasting meaning. Micali argues that Benjamin’s fragment anticipates these conditions by highlighting the internalization of guilt and the psychic cost of capitalist self-fashioning.

== In mass media ==
As a non-trivial explanatory model, the concept of "capitalism as religion" is reflected in the current socio-political discourse, in media publications on social, political and economic issues. In particular, columnists analyze the causes and possible consequences of the election of Donald Trump as president of the United States, pointing out that Trump's statements are in line with the "religious universalization of guilt" aimed at the ultimate "mobilization of higher powers". Spanish "El País" columnist Vicente Serrano sees Facebook as a clear manifestation of "capitalism as religion": the social network is a "virtual temple" with more than 1.5 billion "parishioners" and makes money by commodifying human emotionality, friendship and affection. The "Süddeutsche Zeitung", reporting on the debate between economists and theologians on the relationship between the crisis of faith and the crisis of capitalism, notes that despite the huge money supply and cheap credit, both the modern economy, based on the model of growth "from nothing", and the notions of the invisible hand of the market, embodying the idea of Providence, are being questioned. Doubt, in turn, often comes from the power of faith and the hope of salvation. Guilt and debt are interrelated; theologians do not deny the idea of growth, but see it in a spiritual or ethical sense, recalling the biblical injunction not to impute to a person more than he can bear. (Note: And God is faithful; he will not let you be tempted beyond what you can bear. But when you are tempted, he will also provide a way out so that you can endure it. (1 Corinthians 10:13))

== Editions ==
- Kapitalismus als Religion (Fragmente vermischten Inhalts) // Walter Benjamin: Gesammelte Schriften. Bd. VI. / R. Tiedemann, H. Schweppenhäuser (Hrsg.). — Frankfurt a.M.: Suhrkamp Verlag, 1985. — pp. 100–103, 690–691. — ISBN 3-518-28536-X.; переиздание: 1991.
- Capitalism as Religion // Walter Benjamin. Selected writings (1913–1926). Vol 1. / M. Bullock, M.W. Jennings (eds.). R.Livingstone (transl.). — Cambridge, Ma; L.: Belknap Press of Harvard University Press, 1996. — pp. 288–291. — ISBN 0-674-94585-9.; переиздание: 2004.
- Il Capitalismo come religione // W. Benjamin. Sul concetto di storia / G.Bonola, M.Ranchetti (trad., cur.). — Torino: Einaudi, 1997. — pp. 284–287.
- Le capitalisme comme religion // Walter Benjamin. Fragments philosophiques, politiques, critiques, littéraires / Ch. Jouanlanne et J.F. Poirier (trad.). — P.: PUF, 2000. — pp. 111–113.
- Capitalismo come religione // Teologia politica 1.Teologie estreme? / R. Panattoni, G. Solla (cur.). — Genova; Milano.: Marietti 1820, 2004. — pp. 119–125. — ISBN 978-88-211-9438-2.
- Capitalism as Religion // The Frankfurt School on religion: key writings by the major thinkers / E. Mendieta (ed.). Ch. Kautzer (trans.). — L., N.Y.: Routledge, 2005. — pp. 259–262. — ISBN 0-415-96696-5.
- Kapitalismen som religion // Ord&Bild / Ch. Nilsson (översättning). — Göteborg, 2006. — № 5. — pp. 15–18. — ISSN 0030-4492.
- Capitalismo como religião // Revista Garrafa / J. de Melo Marques Araújo (trad.). — UFRJ, 2011. — Vol. 23 (janeiro-abril). — ISSN 1809-2586.
- Capitalismo come religione // W. Benjamin. Scritti politici / M.Palma (cur., trad.). — Roma: Editori internazionali riuniti, 2011. — pp. 83–89.
- Il Capitalismo come religione // Il capitalismo divino. Colloquio su denaro, consumo, arte e distruzione / S. Franchini (cur.), G.Bonola, M.Ranchetti (trad.). — Milano, Udine: Mimesis, 2011. — pp. 119–125. — ISBN 978-88-575-0642-5.
- Il Capitalismo come religione // Elettra Stimilli. Il debito del vivente. Ascesi e capitalismo. — Macerata: Quodlibet, 2011. — pp. 177–180. — ISBN 978-88-7462-387-7.
- Capitalismo come religione / C. Salzani (cur., trad. Introduzione: Politica profana, o dell’attualità di «Capitalismo come religione»). — Walter Benjamin. Capitalismo come religione (Testo tedesco a fronte). — Genova: Il nuovo Melangolo, 2013. — 60 p. — ISBN 978-88-7018-873-8.
- Капитализм как религия // Вальтер Беньямин. Учение о подобии. Медиаэстетические произведения. Сб. статей / Пер. с нем. А. Пензина. Фил. ред. пер. А.В. Белобратов. Сост. и посл. И. Чубаров, И.Болдырев. — М.: РГГУ, 2012. — pp. 100–108. — ISBN 978-5-7281-1276-1.
- O capitalismo como religião // Walter Benjamin. O capitalismo como religião / M.Löwy (ed.). N. Schneider (trad.). — São Paulo: Boitempo, 2013. — ISBN 978-85-7559-329-5.
- Kapitalisme som religion // Kapitalisme som religion. Walter Benjamin, Robert Kurz, Giorgio Agamben / M.Bolt, D. Routhier (forord, redigeret). — København: Nebula, 2015. — pp. 7–40. — ISBN 978-87-998679-0-5.
- El capitalismo como religión // Katatay. Revista Crítica de Literatura Latinoamericana / E.Foffani, J.A. Ennis (red., trad., introducción). — La Plata: Katatay, 2016. — № 13–14 (abril). — pp. 178–191. — ISSN 1669-3868.
