= Ishvara =

Hindu epithet

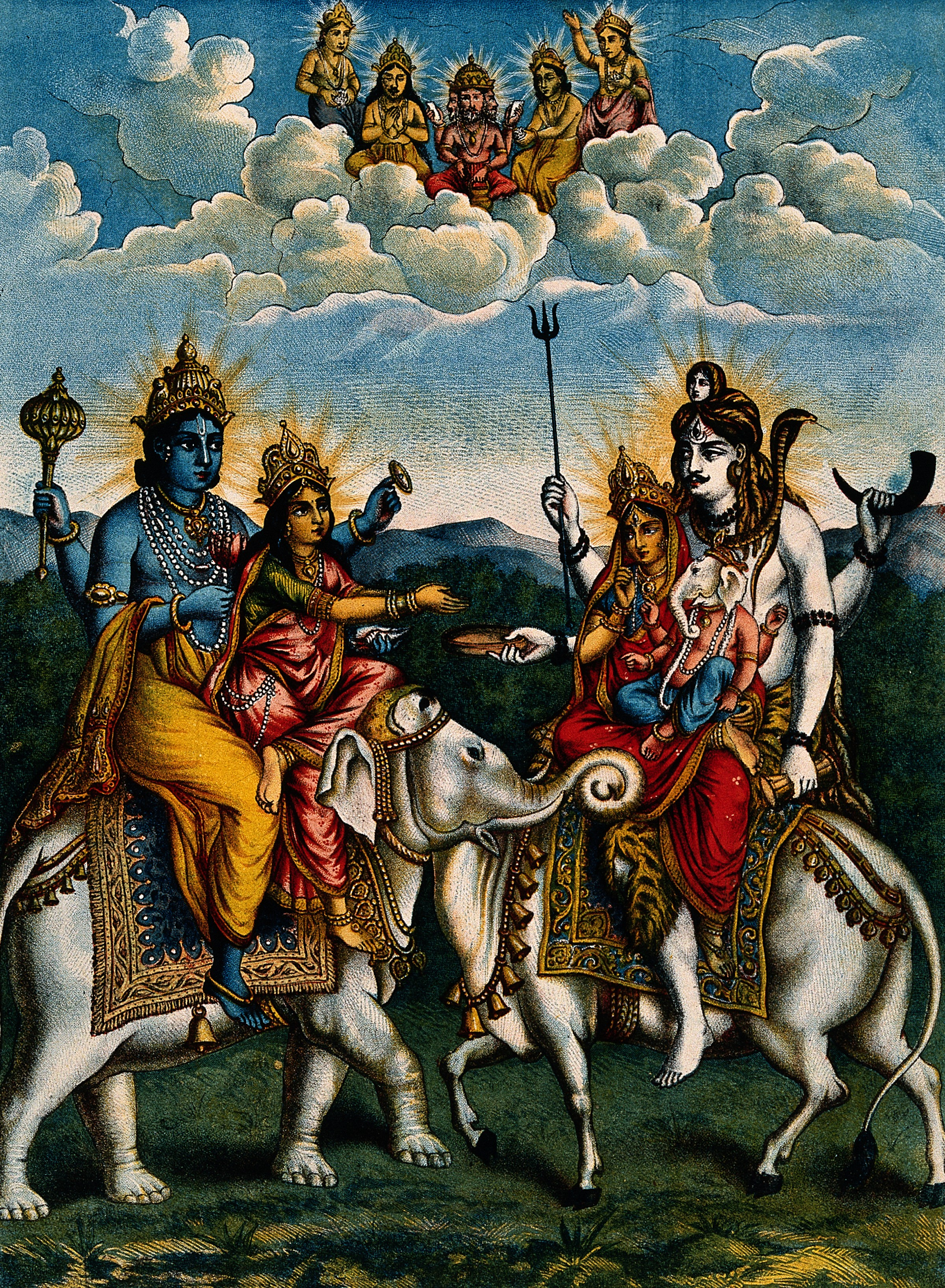
Vishnu and Shiva, the primary bearers of the epithet Ishvara, seated on mounts with consorts Lakshmi and Parvati, accompanied by Ganesha

Ishvara (Sanskrit: ईश्वर, romanised: Īśvara) is a concept in Hinduism, with a wide range of meanings that depend on the era and the school of Hinduism. In ancient texts of Hindu philosophy, depending on the context, Ishvara can mean lord, ruler, king, husband, queen, soul or the Supreme Self (Paramatman). In medieval-era Hindu texts, depending on the school of Hinduism, Ishvara means God, Supreme Being, personal God, or special Self. In Hinduism, Ishvara is an common epithet of Shiva. In Vaishnavism, it is synonymous with Vishnu, like in his epithet of Venkateswara. In traditional Bhakti movements, Ishvara is one or more deities of an individual's preference (Iṣṭa-devatā) from Hinduism's polytheistic canon of deities. In modern-day sectarian movements like Arya Samaj and Brahmoism, Ishvara takes the form of a monotheistic God. In the Yoga school of Hinduism, it is any "personal deity" or "spiritual inspiration". In Advaita Vedanta, Ishvara is the manifested form of Brahman (Saguna brahman).

== Etymology ==
The root of the word Ishvara comes from Ish (ईश् īś-) meaning "capable of" and "owner, ruler, chief of". The second part of the word Ishvara is vara (वर vara), which means depending on context, "best, excellent, beautiful", "choice, wish, blessing, boon, gift", and "suitor, lover, one who solicits a girl in marriage". The composite word, Ishvara literally means "owner of best, beautiful", "ruler of choices, blessings, boons", or "chief of suitor, lover".

As a concept, Ishvara in ancient and medieval Sanskrit texts variously means a ruler or king, a husband, God, Supreme Being, Supreme Self, Shiva, the god of love, one of the Rudras and the number 'eleven'.

The word Īśvara does not appear in Rigveda. However, the verb īś- does appear in Rigveda, where the context suggests that the meaning of it is "capable of, able to". It is absent in Samaveda, is rare in Atharvaveda, but it appears in Samhitas of Yajurveda. The contextual meaning, however as the ancient Indian grammarian Pāṇini explains, is neither god nor supreme being.

The word Ishvara appears in numerous ancient Dharmasutras. However, there Ishvara does not mean God, but means Vedas. Ishvara in Dharmasutras could alternatively mean king, with the context literally asserting that the Dharmasutras are as important as Ishvara (the king) on matters of public importance".

The term is used as part of the compounds Maheshvara ("The Great Lord") and Parameshvara ("The Supreme Lord") as the names of Vishnu and Shiva. In Mahayana Buddhism it is used as part of the compound "Avalokiteśvara" ("lord who hears the cries of the world", but see etymology section there), the name of a bodhisattva revered for his compassion. When referring to divine as female, particularly in Shaktism, the feminine Ishvari is sometimes used.

In Advaita Vedanta school, Ishvara is a monistic Universal Absolute that connects and is the Oneness in everyone and everything.

== Schools of thought ==
Among the six systems of Hindu philosophy, Samkhya and Mimāmsa do not consider the concept of Ishvara (i.e., a supreme being) relevant. Yoga, Vaisheshika, Vedanta and Nyaya schools of Hinduism discuss Ishvara, but assign different meanings.

Ishvara is a metaphysical concept in the Yogasutras. The book does not mention a specific deity or describe any devotional practices (Bhakti), nor does it provide characteristics of Ishvara typically associated with a deity. In the Yoga school of Hinduism, states Ian Whicher, a professor of religion at the University of Manitoba, Ishvara is neither a creator God nor the universal Absolute of Advaita Vedanta. Whicher also notes that some theistic sub-schools of Vedantic philosophy of Hinduism, inspired by the Yoga school, explain the term Ishvara as the "Supreme Being that rules over the cosmos and the individuated beings". Angelika Malinar, a professor of Indian studies at the University of Zurich, too, writes that, among the Samkhya-Yoga schools of Hinduism, Ishvara is neither a creator God nor a salvific God.

Bhakti sub-schools refer to Ishvara as a divine lord or the specified deity of the Bhakti sub-school. Some contemporary sectarian movements have emphasised Ishvara as a supreme lord—for example, the International Society for Krishna Consciousness's theology is monotheistic, with Krishna being the universe's supreme divinity. In traditional theistic sub-schools of Hinduism, such as the Vishishtadvaita of Ramanuja and Dvaita of Madhva, Ishvara is identified as Vishnu and/or Narayana, who is distinct from the prakṛti (material world) and purusha (Self).

The diversity in interpretations of Ishvara aligns with theistic Hinduism's notion of a personal God. Thus, Hinduisms also allow practicing individuals choice in their conceptualisations of Ishvara, whether that be in the form of a specific deity or the formless Brahman of ultimate reality.

=== In Samkhya ===
Samkhya is commonly considered an atheistic school of Hindu philosophy. However, some, such as Norwegian scholar Knut A. Jacobsen, consider Samkhya to be more accurately described as a form of nontheism. Still others, including State University of New York Indologist and professor Andrew J. Nicholson, argue that Samkhya was originally theistic but transitioned to atheism during the Middle Ages. Ishvara as a being is occasionally affirmed—but more often denied—in the Samkhya school. For example, arguments are advanced in the Samkhya Pravachana Sutra and its commentaries against the existence of Ishvara, chiefly that a being that is both a creator and free cannot exist.

=== In Yoga ===
The Yoga Sutras of Patanjali, the foundational text of the Yoga school of Hinduism, uses the term Ishvara in 11 verses: I.23–I.29, II.1, II.2, II.32 and II.45. Since the Sutras were compiled, Hindu scholars have debated the identity and purpose of Ishvara, with beliefs ranging from Ishvara-as-"personal god" to it being "special Self", and to "anything that has spiritual significance to the individual". Whicher explains that while Patanjali's terse verses can be interpreted both as theistic or nontheistic, the compiler's concept of Ishvara in Yogic philosophy functions as a "transformative catalyst or guide for aiding the yogin on the path to spiritual emancipation".

Patanjali defines Ishvara (Sanskrit: ईश्वर) in verse 24 of Book 1 as "a special Self (पुरुषविशेष, puruṣa-viśeṣa)",

Sanskrit: क्लेश कर्म विपाकाशयैरपरामृष्टः पुरुषविशेष ईश्वरः ॥२४॥
– Yoga Sutras I.24

This sutra adds the characteristics of Ishvara as the special Self which is unaffected (अपरामृष्ट, aparamrsta) by one's obstacles/hardships (क्लेश, klesha), one's circumstances created by past or one's current actions (कर्म, karma), one's life fruits (विपाक, vipâka), and one's psychological dispositions/intentions (आशय, ashaya).

Patanjali's concept of Ishvara is neither as a creator God nor the universal Absolute of Advaita Vedanta.

=== In Vaisesika ===
The Vaisheshika school of Hinduism, as founded by Kanada in the 1st millennium BCE, neither required nor relied on Ishvara for its atomistic naturalist philosophy. To it, substances and paramāṇu (atoms) are eternal; they move and interact based on impersonal, eternal adrsta (अदृष्ट, invisible) laws of nature. The concept of Ishvara, among others, entered into the Vaisheshika school many centuries later in the 1st millennium CE. The evolution in ideas aimed to explain how and why its so-called "atoms" have a particular order and proportions. Later ancient Vaisheshika scholars retained their belief that substances are eternal, and added Ishvara as another 'eternal'—albeit one who is also omniscient and omnipresent (but not omnipotent). Vaisheshika scholars posited that Ishvara did not create the world; he created laws that operate the world before becoming passive and letting those universal laws affect reality without divine intervention . Thus, Vaisheshika's Ishvara mirrors the Deus otiosus of deism. Klaus Klostermaier, in a 2007 survey of Hinduism, writes that Ishvara can be understood as an eternal God who co-exists in the universe with eternal substances and atoms, but only to the point that he "winds up the clock, and lets it run its course".

=== In Nyaya ===
Early Nyaya school scholars considered Ishvara a creator God with the power to grant blessings, boons, and fruits. However, the early Nyaya scholars rejected this hypothesis, though not the existence of God itself, and were non-theistic. Over time, the Nyaya school became one of the most important defenders of theism in Hindu philosophy.

Nyayasutra's Book 4, Chapter 1, examines what causes the production and destruction of entities (life, matter) in the universe. It considers many hypotheses, including Ishvara. Verses 19–21 postulate that Ishvara exists and is the cause, state a consequence of the postulate, then present contrary evidence, and from the contradiction conclude that the postulate must be invalid.

सिद्धान्तसूत्र : ईश्वरः कारणम्, पुरुषकर्माफल्यदर्शनात्

पूर्वपक्षसूत्र : न, पुरुषकर्माभावे फ्लानिष्पत्तेः
सिद्धान्तसूत्र : तत्कारितत्वादहेतुः

Proposition sutra: Ishvara is the cause, since we see sometimes human action lacks fruits (results).
Prima facie objection sutra: This is not so since, as a matter of fact, no fruit is accomplished without human action.

Conclusion sutra: Not so, since it is influenced by him.

— IV.1.19 – IV.1.21

Centuries later, the 5th-century CE Nyaya school scholar Prastapada revisited the premise of Ishvara. He was followed by Udayana, who in his text Nyayakusumanjali, interpreted "it" in verse 4.1.21 of Nyaya Sutra above, as "human action" and "him" as "Ishvara", then he developed counter arguments to prove the existence of Ishvara. In developing his arguments, he inherently defined Ishvara as efficient cause, omnipotent, omniscient, infallible, giver of gifts, ability and meaning to humanity, divine creator of the world as well as the moral principles, and the unseen power that makes the karma doctrine work.

=== In Mimamsa ===
Mīmāṃsā scholars of Hinduism questioned what Ishvara (God) is. They used their pramana tools to cross-examine answers offered by other schools of Hinduism. For example, when Nyaya scholars stated that God is omnipotent, omniscient, and infallible, that the world is the result of God's creation, which is proved by the presence of creatures, just like human work proves human existence, Mimamsa scholars asked, Why does this God create the world, for what reason? Further, they added, it cannot be because of Ishvara's love for human beings, because this world, if Ishvara created it, is imperfect, and human souls suffer. Mimamsa scholars of Hinduism raised numerous objections to any definition of Ishvara and its premises. They deconstructed justifications for the concept of Ishvara and considered it unnecessary for a consistent philosophy and moksha (spiritual liberation).

=== In Vedanta ===
==== Advaita Vedanta ====
The Advaita Vedanta school of Hinduism proclaims that at the empirical level, Ishvara is the cause of the universe and the one who awards the fruits of every action. He is defined i as the one without likes and dislikes, as well embodied with compassion (vaiṣamya Nairgghṛṇya doṣa vihīnaḥ). Ishvara is that which is "free from avidyā (ignorance), free from ahaṃkṛti (ego-sense), free from bandhana (bondage)", a Self that is "pure, enlightened, liberated". Having accepted and established Ishvara, Advaita Vedanta proclaims that the fundamental nature of Ishvara (existence, consciousness, and bliss) is non-different from the fundamental nature of an individual. This gives room in Advaita Vedanta to show the nature of Ishvara as both the material and instrumental cause of this universe and the individual who is limited in his own capacities as unreal, and declare that there is oneness between the two, having negated the qualities. This establishes Ishvara as 'saguṇa' or with attributes from the empirical existence and 'nirguṇa' from the absolute sense. This oneness is accepted only at the 'mukti' or ultimate realisation level and not at the 'vyavahara' or empirical level. At the absolute level, there is no otherness nor distinction between Jiva (living being) and Ishvara, and any attempts to distinguish the two are a false idea, one based on wrong knowledge, according to Advaita Vedanta.

ईश्वरः अहम्
Ishvara, I am.

— Adi Shankara, Upadesasahasri 2.3.1, 2.10.8

Other Advaitin Hindu texts resonate with the monist views of Adi Shankara. For example, Isa Upanishad, in hymn 1.5-7, states Ishvara is "above everything, outside everything, beyond everything, yet also within everything"; he who knows himself as all beings and all beings as himself – he never becomes alarmed before anyone. He becomes free from fears, delusions, and the root cause of evil. He becomes pure, invulnerable, unified, free from evil, accurate to truth, liberated like Ishvara.

When the universe is not manifest, Shankara conceives of Ishvara as abiding in a state of dreamless sleep. The universe's manifestation occurs when Ishvara is in a dreaming state, wherein Ishvara is visualising the universe owing to its memory of previous creations. Just as the state of dreaming is dependent on memory (not separate from the mind), the universe does not have an existence separate from Ishvara. Ishvara's knowledge is thus a necessary condition for the universe's existence.

==== Vishishtadvaita Vedanta ====
Ishvara, in Vishishtadvaita Vedanta sub-school of Hinduism, is a composite concept of dualism and non-dualism, or "non-dualism with differentiation". Ishvara, Vishishtadvaitin scholars such as the 11th century Ramanuja state, is the supreme creator and synonymous with Brahman. Equated with Vishnu in Vishishtadvaita or one of his avatar, he is both the material and efficient cause, transcendent and immanent. Ishvara manifests in five forms, according to the Vishishtadvaitins: para (transcendent), vyuha (emanations), vibhava (incarnations), antaryamin (dwells inside), and arca (icons). According to this sub-school, states John Grimes, Ishvara possesses six divine qualities: jnana (knowledge), bala (strength), aisvarya (lordship), sakti (power), virya (virility) and tejas (splendor).

Ramanuja's Vishishtadvaita concepts provided the foundation for several Bhakti movements of Hinduism, such as those by Sri Aurobindo and has been suggested as having influenced Basava's Lingayatism.

==== Dvaita Vedanta ====
The Dvaita (dualism) sub-school of Vedanta Hinduism, founded by 13th 13th-century Madhva, defines Ishvara as the creator God that is distinct from Jiva (individual Selves in living beings). Narayana (Vishnu) is considered to be Ishvara, and the Vaishnavism movement arose on the foundation developed by Dvaita Vedanta sub-school.

Ishvara (God) is a complete, perfect, and the highest reality to Dvaitins, and simultaneously, the world is a separate reality for them, unlike competing thoughts in other sub-schools of Vedanta. In Dvaita sub-school, Jiva (individual Self) is different, yet dependent on Ishvara (God). Both possess the attributes of consciousness, bliss, and existence, but the individual Self is considered atomic, while God is all-encompassing. The attributes of Jiva struggle to manifest, while God fully manifests them.

Madhva states there are five permutations of differences between Jiva (individual Self) and Ishvara (God): between God and Self, between God and matter, between Self and matter, between one Self and another Self, and between one material thing and another material thing. The differences are both qualitative and quantitative. Unlike Advaita Vedantins who hold that knowledge can lead to Oneness with everyone and everything as well as fusion with the Universal Timeless Absolute, to the state of moksha in this life, Dvaita Vedantins hold that moksha is possible only in after-life if God so wills (if not, then one's Self is reborn). Further, Madhva highlights that God creates individual Self, but the individual Self never was and never will become one with God; the best it can do is to experience bliss by getting infinitely close to God.

The world, called Maya, is held as the divine will of Ishvara. Jiva suffers, experiences misery and bondage, state Dvaitins, because of "ignorance and incorrect knowledge" (ajnana). Liberation occurs with the correct knowledge and attainment unto Lord Narayana. It is His grace that gives salvation according to Dvaita sub-school, which is achievable by predominance of sattva guna (moral, constructive, simple, kindness-filled life), and therefore Dvaitins must live a dharmic life while constantly remembering, deeply loving Ishvara.

==== Achintya-Bheda-Abheda ====
Acintya bhedābheda is a sub-school of Vedanta representing the philosophy of inconceivable one-ness and difference, in relation to the creation, Prakriti, and the creator, Ishvara (Krishna).

In Sanskrit achintya means 'inconceivable', bheda translates as 'difference', and abheda translates to 'one-ness'. Self (their English phrase for the Sanskrit word: jiva) is considered a part of God, and thus one with Him in quality, yet at the same time different from Him in quantity. This is called acintya-bheda-abheda-tattva, inconceivable, simultaneous oneness and difference.

Caitanya's philosophy of acintya-bhedābheda-tattva is understood to be part of a progression to devotional theism. Rāmānuja had agreed with Śaṅkara that the Absolute is one only, but he had disagreed by affirming individual variety within that oneness. Madhva had underscored the eternal duality of the Supreme and the jiva: he had maintained that this duality endures even after liberation. Caitanya, in turn, specified that the Supreme and the jīvas are "inconceivably, simultaneously one and different" (acintya-bheda-abheda).

=== In Carvaka ===
Cārvāka, another atheist tradition in sramana, was materialist and a school of philosophical scepticism. They rejected all concepts of Ishvara and all forms of supernaturalism.

== See also ==
- Absolute (philosophy)
- Bhagavan
- Conceptions of God
- Ishbara
- Maheśvara (Buddhism)
- Parameshashakti
