= Parameshashakti =

In Hinduism, is the power of Parameshwara or Ishvara

Parameshashakti in Hinduism is the power of Parameshwara or Ishvara, the conditioned Brahman. It is Maya, the anadyavidya (the beginningless avidya) that has no reality in the absolute sense but is superior to its effects and inferred by them, hence, also called, avyakta. It is established by ikshana ("seeing", "thinking"), by samkalpa ("purposing") and parinama ("transformation"). Parameshashakti gives birth to this entire world. Therefore, it is Prakrti.(Vivekachudamani.110)

== Qualities ==
Adi Shankara qualifies Parameshashakti or the power that is Maya, as – It is not sat ("real"), not asat ("unreal"), not both; it is not bhinna ("different"), not abhinna ("not non-different"), "not both".(Vivekachudamani.111) Sri Chandrasekhara Bharati of Srngeri explains that what is never experienced at any time by anybody is unreal and there is no non-existence for what is real. Because it is not possible to determine if it is real or unreal this shakti is anirvchaniya ("indescribable").

Paramesasakti is trigunatmika i.e. possesses three qualities – Rajas, Tamas and Sattva, and therefore, comprises three powers – Vikshepashakti, "the power of projection" (projecting differently) which pertains to rajoguna, Avaranashakti, the "power of concealment" (concealing the real nature of things) which pertains to tamoguna and Jnanashakti which is reflected in sattvaguna. The first two are causes of bondage; the third makes for liberation. Vikshepashakti sets in motion the beginningless samsara connected with the Jiva and also with Ishvara who is the cause of the creation of the world and which creation is effected by this shakti. Rajas and Tamas hinder Jiva's spiritual uplift.

== Vikshepashakti ==
Vikshepashakti pertains to Rajoguna and is of the nature of activity. Adi Shankara states that from it is the well-known ancient samsaric procession and from it issue forth always attachment, pain etc., which are modifications of the mind; and that desire, anger, avarice, pride, jealousy, egoism, envy, niggardliness etc., these are its terrible characteristics that are inducements to actions of men, by the process of superimposition they are all imagined in the Jiva and cause bondage. (Vivekachudamani. 113–4). It is the power that projects the unreal on the real to delude the Jiva.

== Avaranashakti ==
Avarnashakti pertains to Tamo guna whose effects are – ignorance, apathy, sloth, sleep, negligence, foolishness, etc. Adi Shankara states that it makes for the wrong projection of objects differently from what they are and is the root cause of the functioning of the projecting power and the original cause for the procession of samsara. Procession of samsara means – "Man’s transmigration". The person overpowered by tamoguna and this shakti does not see clearly because it envelopes the nature of an object and makes it appear otherwise; he considers what is super-imposed by his delusion as true and attaches himself to its qualities. The concealing power of this shakti makes for untold hardships.(Vivekachudamani.115-6)

== Jnanashakti ==
Jnanashakti pertains to Sattvaguna whose effects are – limpidity of mind, realisation of one's own self, supreme peace, contentment, great joy and being anchored in the Paramatman always which ensures the enjoyment of bliss without intermission. Adi Shankara states that sattva is very pure yet in combination with rajas and tamas it makes for samsara in the same way as the original which is the atman when reflected makes the entire inanimate world bright as the sun does. The effects of this shakti are – complete absence of pride etc., the presence of yama ("self-restraint") and niyama ("practice of prescribed acts" etc.,), longing for liberation, of divine tendencies, and withdrawal from whatever is not real. (Vivekachudamani.119-121)

== Implication ==
Parameshashakti on account of its three gunas and three powers/shaktis creates the gross body, the subtle body and the causal body of the individual self, the Anatman, which then gets connected with all three states of consciousness. This shakti prepares the Jiva to experience existence and for the fourth state of consciousness. The three constituents of matter, sattva, tamas and rajas, which make the world, and the world itself are not permanent, they go on changing, they have names and forms and are constituted by a gradation of happiness and sorrow. Adi Shankara explains that unembodiedness (i.e. the state of not being identified with the body) is not the product of virtuous deeds, for unembodiedness is inherent in the Self. Liberation is different from results of works. Liberation is Brahman.
