= Deus absconditus =

Christian theological concept

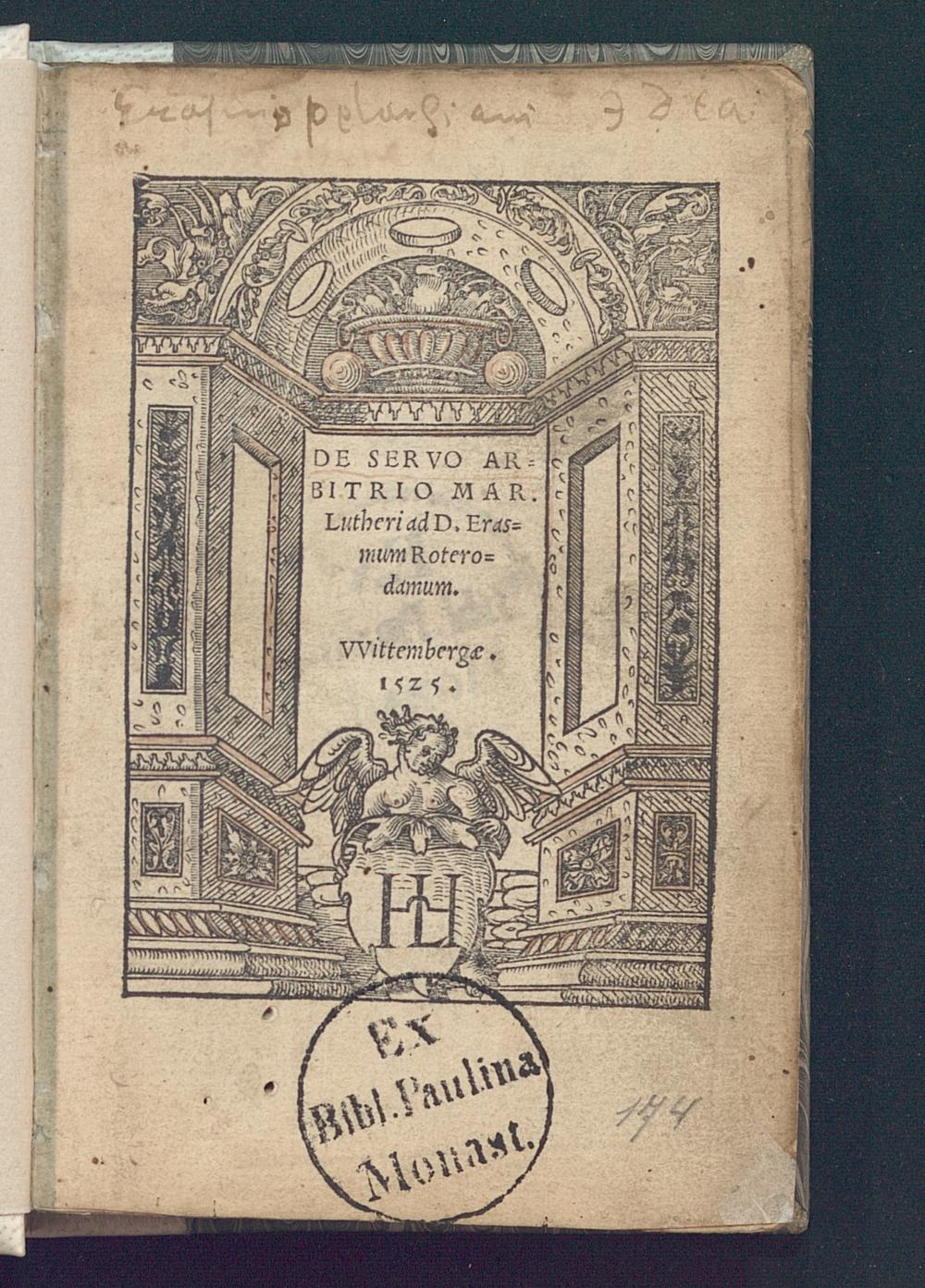
Protestant reformer Martin Luther unfolded his views on the concepts of Deus absconditus and Deus revelatus in his theological treatise De Servo Arbitrio (1525)

Deus absconditus (Latin for 'hidden god') refers to the Christian theological concept of the fundamental unknowability of the essence of God. The term is derived from the Old Testament of the Christian Bible, specifically from the Book of Isaiah: "Truly, you are a God who hides himself, O God of Israel, the Savior" (Isaiah 45:15). This concept was particularly important for the theological thought of the medieval Christian theologians Thomas Aquinas, Nicholas of Cusa, and Martin Luther.

Today, the Christian theological concept of Deus absconditus is primarily associated with the theology of Martin Luther and later Protestant theologians. Luther unfolded his views on Deus absconditus in his theological treatise De Servo Arbitrio in 1525. But he had already hinted at this idea in his lectures on the Book of Psalms and in his lecture on the Epistle to the Romans ten years earlier. The opposite of Deus absconditus in Lutheran theology is the concept of Deus revelatus ("revealed God").

In the Kingdom of France, the concept was important to the Jansenist movement, which included Blaise Pascal and Jean Racine. The French philosopher Lucien Goldmann would title a 1964 book on Pascal and Racine, The Hidden God: A Study of Tragic Vision in the Pensées of Pascal and the Tragedies of Racine.

== See also ==
- Deus deceptor
- Deus otiosus
- Divine hiddenness
- Ethical monotheism
- History of Christian theology
- Outline of theology
- Philosophical theology
- Theodicy
- Theology of the Cross

== Bibliography ==
- Volker Leppin: Deus absconditus und Deus revelatus. Transformationen mittelalterlicher Theologie in der Gotteslehre von "De servo arbitrio"; in: Berliner Theologische Zeitschrift 22 (2005), S. 55–69; ISSN 0724-6137
- Martin Luther: Vom unfreien Willen: dass der freie Wille nichts sei. Antwort D. Martin Luthers an Erasmus von Rotterdam; deutsche Übersetzung von De servo arbitrio, übersetzt von Bruno Jordahn, hrsg. v. Georg Merz; München 1983
- Horst Beintker: Luthers Gotteserfahrung und Gottesanschauung; in: Leben und Werk Martin Luthers von 1526 bis 1546 – Festgabe zu seinem 500. Geburtstag, Band 1; Berlin 1985^{2}; S. 39–62
