= Ishbara =

Ishbara (Old Turkic: 𐰃𐱁𐰉𐰺𐰀; Chinese: 沙缽略 Pinyin: Shābōlüè) — a Turkic name deriving from Sanskrit ईश्वर (Īśvara). The name was carried by different rulers in history:

- Ishbara Qaghan, East Gokturk khagan (581-587)
- Ishbara Tolis, West Gokturk khagan (634-639)
- Ashina Wushibo, Yabgu of Tokharistan (645-705), grandson of Tong Yabghu Qaghan
- Ishbara Khagan, personal name Ashina Helu, West Gokturk khagan (651-658)
