= Deus otiosus =

Creator god who is no longer involved in the universe

Deus otiosus (Latin for 'inactive god'), and also known as the clockmaker theory, is the belief in a creator god who has entirely withdrawn from governing the universe after creating it or is no longer involved in its daily operation. In Western philosophy, the concept of deus otiosus has been associated with deism and the Age of Enlightenment since the 17th century.

== Examples in the history of religion ==
- In the Eridu Genesis, the younger gods Enlil and Enki replace the deus otiosus Anu.
- In Greek mythology, the older gods like Uranus and Gaia make way for Cronos and Rhea who in turn are succeeded by the Olympians Zeus and Hera and company.
- In Baltic mythology, the primordial supreme god Dievas most probably was a deus otiosus.
- In Christian theology, Protestant reformer Martin Luther used the notion of deus absconditus (Latin for 'hidden god') in order to explain the mystery and remoteness of God.

=== Ishvara in Nyāya-Vaiśeṣika Hinduism ===
In the Nyāya-Vaiśeṣika school of Hinduism as well as in the other ancient Indian schools of philosophy, early philosophical and cosmological theories were predominantly atheistic or non-theistic, which postulated that all objects in the physical universe are reducible to paramāṇu (atoms) of substances whose aggregations, combinations, and interactions explained the nature of the universe. In the 1st millennium CE, the Nyāya-Vaiśeṣika school added the concept of Ishvara to its atomistic and naturalistic philosophy. These later Nyāya and Vaiśeṣika atomists retained their belief that substances are eternal, but included the belief in the existence of an Ishvara, which is regarded as the eternal Supreme Being who is also omniscient and omnipresent.

Nyāya and Vaiśeṣika atomists held that the world was created when order was imposed on pre-existing matter: the motion of atoms was ascribed to the agency of a Supreme Being, which did not create the universe out of nothing according to the Nyāya-Vaiśeṣika school. In the 11th century CE, the organization of atoms was cited as a proof for the existence of God by some Nyāya and Vaiśeṣika atomists. According to Klaus Klostermaier, the Nyāya-Vaiśeṣika belief in the existence of an Ishvara mirrors the Western belief in deus otiosus, since both are conceived as a creator god who retires from the universe after having created the laws that govern nature. Klostermaier further states that Ishvara can be understood as an eternal God who co-exists in the universe with eternal substances and atoms, describing it as a Divine Watchmaker who "winds up the clock, and lets it run its course".

=== Similarity to Deus absconditus ===
A similar concept to the one of deus otiosus is that of deus absconditus, formulated by two prominent Scholastic and Catholic theologians that lived during the Late Middle Ages: Thomas Aquinas (1225–1274) and Nicholas of Cusa (1401–1464). The term is derived from the Old Testament of the Christian Bible, specifically from the Book of Isaiah: "Truly, you are a God who hides himself, Oh God of Israel, the Savior" (Isaiah 45:15). Today, the Christian theological concept of deus absconditus is primarily associated with the theology of Martin Luther and later Protestant theologians.

== See also ==
- Anthropology of religion
  - Evolutionary origin of religions
  - History of religion
  - Prehistoric religion
- Comparative mythology
- Death of God theology
- Deism
  - Christian deism
  - Moralistic therapeutic deism
  - Unmoved mover
- Ethical monotheism
- Fitra
- God gene
- Hanif
- Irreligion
  - Agnostic theism
  - Nontheism
  - Theological noncognitivism
- Naturalistic pantheism
- Nontheistic religion
- Religious naturalism
- Spiritual naturalism
- The One (Neoplatonism)
- Urmonotheismus
