= Digital necromancy =

Use of technology to simulate dead people

Digital necromancy, also known as modern necromancy or digital resurrection, is the use of technology to produce interactive simulacra of people who have already died.

It first emerged in the 2010s, as celebrities had their images and voices posthumously manipulated and used in movies and live concerts through the use of CGI and holograms, respectively. Later, the term started to be applied to the use of deadbots, chatbots that produce responses emulating the behavior of dead people.

Digital necromancy has generated debates on ethics and morality, with some raising concerns about the lack of consent regarding the use of one's image and voice after death, visualization of one's data by unwanted parties, the possibility of such practices changing how humans perceive death, and the risk of simulacra producing ideas that the dead person would never express in life. On the other hand, others argue that it is just a newer way of commemorating and remembering dead people and deadbots are not vastly different from photographs or other memorabilia.

== History ==
The term "digital necromancy" was coined in 2015 by Hannah Ellis-Petersen in an article for the British newspaper The Guardian where she discussed the "resurrection" of dead actors such as Bruce Lee for then recent movies or promotional campaigns. In a 2025 article for Life Writing, Adelaide Sabre and Threasa Meads define and distinguish two related terms: "death tech", which is "the use of digital necromancy for legacy, historical, cultural, or educational purposes" and "grief tech", which relates more to the processes of mourning and commemoration.

Several platforms allow the creation of chatbots designed to behave like a dead person, such as Replika. Both Microsoft (in 2021) and Meta (in December 2025) filed patents that could be used for digital necromancy; Microsoft's product would allow the creation of chatbots that imitate real people, including celebrities, and Meta's patent allowed AI models to keep a social media user active even after they die, using their own data to make the model project how they would post. A Meta spokesperson at the time told the Business Insider that a filed patent doesn't usually mean that technology will truly be developed.

In November 2025, actor Calum Worthy released an app called 2wai that allowed users to create digital clones of real people using three-minute videos as a model.

=== In film ===
Examples include actress Carrie Fisher starring posthumously in Star Wars: The Rise of Skywalker, Ian Holm starring in Alien: Romulus and aborted plans to have James Dean star via CGI in a then planned movie titled Finding Jack. Sometimes, live actors will play a role and have their images superimposed by the likeness of the dead actors, as it happened with Guy Henry and Ingvild Deila in Rogue One, where they served as a base for Peter Cushing and Fisher.

Bruce Lee was also digitally brought back for a whisky commercial, although he abstained from alcohol in life. Audrey Hepburn was featured in a 2013 commercial for the Galaxy chocolate bar by Framestore, 20 years after her death.

Researcher Denver D’Rozario has coined the term "delebs" to describe digitally resurrected celebrities.

=== In television ===
In 2025, Brazilian channel SBT aired a Christmas special featuring Carlos Alberto de Nóbrega alongside his father, who died in 1976.

=== In music ===
A number of dead musicians were able to "perform live" via holograms, including Tupac at the 2012 Coachella and Michael Jackson at the 2014 Billboard Music Awards, besides entire tours by singer Roy Orbison and soprano Maria Callas.

=== In journalism ===
In August 2025, former CNN journalist Jim Acosta interviewed a digital recreation of Joaquin Oliver, a victim of the 2018 Parkland high school shooting, designed by his own parents.

=== On the internet ===
A trend of AI-generated videos in Brazil depicted people saving celebrities who died in accidents, such as racing driver Ayrton Senna or singer Marília Mendonça.

== Impact ==
Digital necromancy prompted some celebrities to set rules on how their images are to be used after they die, including Robin Williams, for example. In a 2023 YouGov poll, 14% of respondents said they would "find comfort in interacting with a digital version of a loved one who had died", and the idea became more popular the younger the respondent was.

In Brazil, the National Council of Advertising Self-Regulation (Conar in the Portuguese acronym) archived a complaint filed against Volkswagen Brazil after it aired a commercial featuring singer Maria Rita in a duet with a digitally recreated version of her mother, Elis Regina, who died in 1982. It did however propose the monitoring of such types of images. In that same year, the Brazilian Senate presented a law that would require explicit authorization from the person for their image to be used after death, but it was archived, as well. In 2025, the Chamber of Deputies also proposed a law to regulate the use of AI in dubbing in Brazil.

== Criticism ==
Speaking to Business Insider, sociology professor Joseph Davis (University of Virginia), expressed concerns that tools such as deadbots could disturb people's grief, which include facing the actual loss of the loved person. He also said that these tools may look like they are bringing people back, but they're not, and some people may confuse this. Argentinian psychologist Gabriel Roóln endorsed these views in an interview for Mexican TV channel TV Azteca.

Citing several examples in popular culture and the Black Mirror episode "Be Right Back", Oliver Jia from The Dispatch at The Washington Post, reflected that "until recently, the passing of someone marked the end. A dead relative or celebrity’s legacy may live on through the memories they leave behind, but no one would expect new material and new conversations from beyond the grave. Today, via artificial intelligence, everyone from tech companies to media conglomerates are trying to flip the script on how humans have perceived life and death for, well, ever." He also projected that "tech companies will undoubtedly exploit people's grief with fraudulent promises that their AI recreations are the same thing as those who have died", but weighted that "not even the most advanced artificial intelligence system can be 100 percent identical to a human being. [...] AI has to draw upon existing data to attempt recreation, but the final results will never be able to match a collective of real human experiences. [...] Countless studies have shown how untreated grief significantly impacts physical and mental health. AI will not fix these problems; it will only exacerbate them by delaying people from facing reality."

Researchers argued in an article published by Humanities and Social Sciences Communications that although humans have often tried to maintain contact with the dead through memories and religious/spiritual practices, now such contact may happen in a certain "two-way" style, since they would interact with a simulacrum, and if such simulacrum is able to operate convincingly, it may well produce "perceived social presence". The authors also commented that the possibility of death no longer fully ending interactions with the living may produce hypothetical scenarios of how the dead person "would" answer certain questions, which is to them "a phenomenological and algorithmic extension of possible futures that the deceased can no longer actually have". While the authors point some possible benefits in deadbots, such as allowing the living to say things that were left unsaid following the person's death, they believe such models can become harmful "if they encourage excessive attachment, avoidance of reality, social withdrawal, or compulsive dependence". Drawing comparison's with Jorge Luis Borges's The Immortal, they project that the end of death as humans know it can empty the meaning of existence. York University's Louise Richardson also raised the question that people who design deadbots after deceased loved ones may deliberately omit qualities perceived as bad, which could create a falsely "sanitised" reproduction of that person.

In an article for the University of Helsinki website, philosopher Patrick Stokes listed the reduction of the dead to mere resources and the end of their commemoration in favor of their replacing as two risks associated to deadbots, although he acknowledged the skepticism with which such projections tend to be me.

Writing for El Heraldo de México, historian Ignacio Anaya saw deadbots as mourning being offered as a service by companies who exploit loss.

On the other hand, a 2023 University of Liverpool article for The Conversation argued that digital necromancy is just a natural evolution of the ordinary mourning practices, and that having simulations say thins that the dead would supposedly say were they still alive is akin to how people usually picture conversations and reactions that these dead loved ones would have. They also propose that people wouldn't take simulations as resurrections of the dead just like they don't do with pictures or audio recordings.

== See also ==
- "Be Right Back"
- Deadbot
- Death and the Internet
