= FISCO =

Chinese trade association

- Financial Blockchain Shenzhen Consortium
- 深圳市金融区块链发展促进会
- Abbreviation: FISCO
- Formation: May 31, 2016; 9 years ago
- Founder: Chinese technology firms
- Type: Nonprofit trade association
- Location: Shenzhen, China
- Region served: China
- Products: FISCO BCOS
- Members: 80 (2024)
- Official language: Chinese
- Main organ: General Assembly
- Website: www.fisco.com.cn

FISCO (Financial Blockchain Shenzhen Consortium) is a Chinese trade association dedicated to exploring and setting standards in the use of blockchains for financial applications. It is led by 20 leading member Chinese financial institutions and financial technology companies. It was established on May 31, 2016.

As of 2017, it had around 80 members in the consortium from financial and fintech industry. The FISCO website was launched on Nov 17, 2016.

== History ==
In June 2016 FISCO was established. In August 2016 FISCO launched a reconciliation platform utilizing blockchain technology. In December 2017 the FISCO open source working group was formed and FISCO BCOS was launched.

In February 2018 FISCO launched a digital escrow application for Guangzhou Arbitration Commission. In March 2018 FISCO reached more than 90 members.

== Governance ==
The General Assembly is the Consortium's highest authority. The standing committee, or the Presidium, is accountable to the General Assembly. It leads the Consortium and conducts day-to-day work while the General Assembly is not in session. The Technical Committee is the subsidiary body of the Presidium, and is in charge of technology issues. The Technology Standardization Work Committee is in charge of project approval, drafting standards, standards examination, approval and publication. The Advisory Committee is in charge of organizing external experts to participate in the research and discussion of technology and standards.

== Projects ==
FISCO has established research projects in areas including credit, equity, loyalty points system, insurance, commercial bills, cloud service, digital assets, and wealth management issuance and trading. Some projects have launched prototypes. FISCO published its propositions for financial distributed ledger in Nov 2016. For the development of distributed ledgers, the paper proposed five principles: legal compliance, traceability, security, privacy protection and business driven; and seven propositions: value alliance, autonomy and controllability, security and reliability, high efficiency and availability, business feasibility, flexibility, portability and Regtech ready.

== Members ==
Among the members are:

- Shenzhen Fin-Tech Association
- WeBank
- Shenzhen Securities Communication Co. Ltd (SSCC)
- Tencent
- Beyondsoft
- Huawei
- Digital China
- Forms Syntront
- Yuexiu FinTech

== Product ==
FISCO BCOS (Be Credible, Open & Secure) is an enterprise-grade permissioned blockchain system, which was launched by FISCO open-source working group in 2017. FISCO BCOS includes features customized for the financial industry. In December 2017, it was published as an open source blockchain platform. In 2018, FISCO BCOS was brought into practical use as application for use in the area of reconciliation and digital escrow. FISCO BCOS is based on a customized Ethereum.
