= Deadbot =

Avatar of a dead person created by AI

A deadbot, deathbot, or griefbot is a digital avatar, created with artificial intelligence, which resembles a person who is dead. Griefbots employ natural language processing and machine-learning techniques to approximate the style and personality of a deceased person. They may appear as chatbots, voice assistants, or animated avatars, and are often trained on an individual's digital remains.

== History ==
The notion of “deadbots” was first academically proposed by researchers in the late 1990s, with early projects suggesting how a person’s identity could be preserved after death. This idea continued to take shape in the mid 2010s, with projects such as Hossein Rahnama’s Augmented Eternity research at MIT Media Lab and Toronto Metropolitan University and Marius Ursache’s Eternime. Deadbots became closer to realization with Open AI’s GPT-3 model. Programmer Jason Rohrer launched Project December, a web based artificial intelligence platform that allowed users to create conversational replicas of deceased loved ones. Joshua Barbeau’s famous use of Project December to replicate his deceased fiancée gained widespread attention online.

== Technology ==
Deadbots are designed to learn from the digital information of a deceased person, resulting in a digital avatar meant to embody the personality, style, and memories of loved ones.

Large Language Models (LLMs) with chatbots trained on the data of the deceased are considered as deadbots. These models are limited by their training data and may hallucinate responses if prompted questions outside of its available data. To mitigate hallucinations a method called Retrieval-augmented generation (RAG) was developed to retrieve data and ground information for responses. For deadbots this method extracts a person's digital data to maintain accurate representation.

Determining how closely models adhere to the available digital data of a person is a design choice that can restrict models to data from digital archives of a person leading to repetitive responses but maintaining authenticity. Other models may be allowed to explore extrapolation from available data of a person to maintain conversation, but risks becoming “out of character”.

Currently, deadbots are limited to memorial platforms to honor the dead and interactive digital avatars with personas of the deceased. Future deadbot applications being explored lie primarily within education, with intent to create digital avatars that can provide experimental learning in fields such as healthcare and business.

== Uses ==
=== Media ===
Deadbots are referenced in television series such as in S5 E6 of Star Trek: Discovery “Whistlespeak” where Culber’s has a conversation with a holographic ghost of his abuela who has been dead for 800 years. In an episode of Black Mirror, “Be Right Back,” a grieving widow downloads her late husband's digital media into an artificial body. Deadbots can also be understood as a form of art in which various forms of media are aggregated to create an avatar as a virtual chatbot or embedded into an artificial body.

=== Remembrance ===
Deadbots can be forms of memory artifacts allowing for dynamic and dialogue, differentiating from photos or gravesites that cannot facilitate real-time interaction.

False memories can be implanted, evidence of the fluid nature of memory. Interacting with deadbots can impact memory, producing a third kind of memory, one that entangles human memories with generated memory components. This hybrid narrative fuses one’s memory of a loved one with their new experiences with the deadbot effectively reviving the line of their memory. Studies have shown that engaging in conversations about death with deadbots can reduce people’s anxiety about death and make them more likely to discuss end-of-life matters with their loved ones.

=== Artificial intimacy ===
Artificial intimacy or human-technology relationships are being explored. These relationships differ from human ones, providing constant nurturing with no risk of difference in opinion or abandonment. The implementation of deadbots into artificial intimacy could pose an issue if the flexibility of AI avatar conflicts with pre-established algorithmic personalities of a person.

=== Education ===
A 2026 study found that if properly outfitted, artificial intelligence replicas of deceased business executives and entrepreneurs could produce meaningful learning. The Kolb Experiential Learning cycle is one metric of this and the study found deadbots meet the indicated criteria of engaging in the four stages of the learning cycle.

== Ethics ==
Developing deadbots requires harvesting extensive personal digital data, such as text messages, voice recordings, emails and social media posts, in order to train machine learning and AI models, often without clear regulations regarding post-mortem data protection.

Ethical concerns include those related to donors' consent and the surviving families' autonomy over whether their loved ones' data should be harvested and potentially monetised.

Commercial platforms selling deadbots may risk exploiting grieving users through paid subscriptions and targeted advertising. The technology allowing for the integration of generative audio and video deepfakes into deadbots can facilitate impersonation and identity theft, as well as emotional and financial blackmailing targeting surviving loved ones.

== Legality ==
The increased use of AI chatbots, and in turn deadbots, have led to regulations restricting the use of AI for applications that could potentially harm or pose risks such as privacy, consent, and manipulation to the users.

Privacy and consent of the deceased have been debated with cases where people have consented to pre-mortem donor authorization where their personal digital data is scraped and used to train a chatbot. Though many cases are done without the consent of the deceased or consent of the family of the deceased, leading to the illegal scraping of data and personal information.

Concerns regarding the possibility of manipulation and deception of grieving users has been risen. Providing the grounds to emotionally manipulate the user with a deadbot impersonating a deceased loved one and take action that may be unfavorable to the user.

The EU AI Act implemented by the European Commission sets regulations prohibiting the use of AI for manipulation & deception, emotion recognition, biometric categorization, untargeted scraping of data, and real-time remote biometric identification (RBI).

Due to the rapidly evolving technology, regulations and policies regarding deadbots are still in progress of being formed and are subject to change as more information is revealed about it affects and applications.

== Products ==
==== 2wai ====
An app that allows users to interact with pre-made and custom avatars. One unique feature encouraged users to create deadbots. November 2025 ad experienced backlash over the depiction of a woman’s grandson continuing to interact with his grandmother even after passing through the app.

==== Hereafter.ai ====
A part of “grief tech technology”. Inspired by his own dying father’s voice, James Vlahos began his own “Dadbot” project, which would later become HereAfter AI. The app has since shut down and been offline since August 2026.

== Environmental impacts ==
Deadbot use requires intensive energy requirements generating significant amounts of heat in order for the software to function. To prevent overheating, mass amounts of potable water are required to run through and cooldown servers, leading to the depletion of water in areas where datacenters are prominent.

The use of deadbots accumulates electronic waste from the discarded electrical components used to create AI software. Dismantlement and shredding of electronic waste releases harmful particles into the atmosphere causing increased amounts of air pollution and contamination of water and soil when improperly disposed of. The accumulation of e-waste driven by AI has grown to 31 to 46 million tons per year, with only a fraction being recycled.

Data centers are responsible for 4.4% of energy usage within the United States making up around 1.5% worldwide. Chatbots use about 50 gigawatts of energy just for training; this is equivalent to powering San Francisco for 3 days.

== Cultural and societal impact ==
Several scholars have approached the phenomenon from different perspectives. Jiménez-Alonso and Brescó de Luna (2022) examined griefbots from the standpoint of the cultural psychology of grief and the theory of technological mediation, exploring their role in the reconstruction of the relationship with the deceased and the psychological and ethical implications of these technologies. Subsequently, Hollanek and Nowaczyk-Basińska (2024) developed an ethical design taxonomy centred on the different actors involved (data donors, data recipients, and interactants). Edina Harbinja and Lilian Edwards formalized the concept of post-mortem privacy, and Carl J. Öhman at the Oxford Internet Institute studied the management of large-scale digital remains.

Cultural acceptance varies: while some view them as expressions of remembrance, others regard them as unsettling or ethically problematic. Concerns have been raised about deadbots' potential for creating psychological harm. Griefbots are considered part of the phenomenon of artificial intimacy.

== See also ==
- Online memorial
- Simulacrum
- Digital afterlife
