= Map–territory relation =

Relationship between an object and its representation

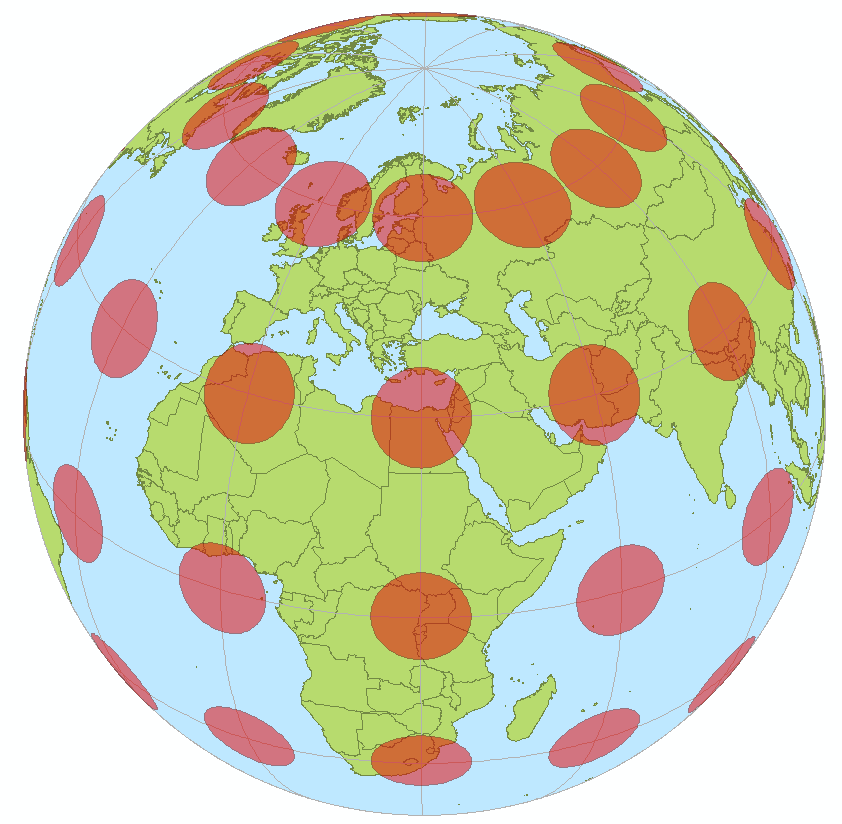
Tissot's indicatrices viewed on a sphere: All are identical circles.

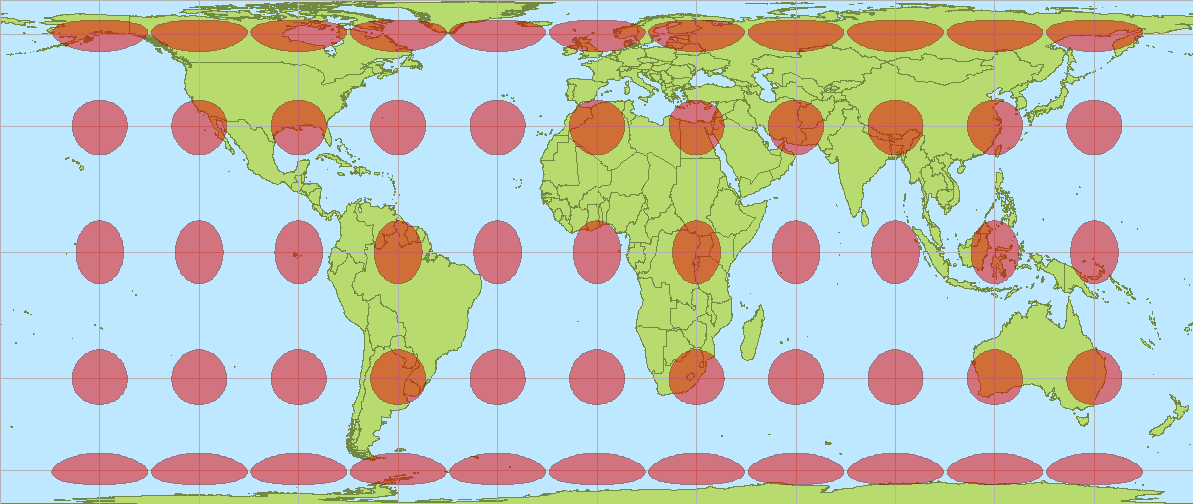
The Behrmann projection with Tissot's indicatrices

The indicatrices demonstrate the difference between the 3D world as seen from space and 2D projections of its surface.

The map–territory relation is the relationship between an object and a representation of that object, as in the relation between a geographical territory and a map of it. Mistaking the map for the territory is a logical fallacy that occurs when someone confuses the semantics of a term with what it represents. Polish-American scientist and philosopher Alfred Korzybski remarked that "the map is not the territory" and that "the word is not the thing", encapsulating his view that an abstraction derived from something, or a reaction to it, is not the thing itself. Korzybski held that many people do confuse maps with territories, that is, confuse conceptual model of reality with reality itself. These ideas are crucial to general semantics, a system Korzybski originated.

The relationship has also been expressed in other terms, such as "the model is not the data", "all models are wrong", and Alan Watts's "The menu is not the meal." (Note: Widely attributed to Alan Watts, "The menu is not the meal" may be an unrecorded quote, or it may be a paraphrase derived from two recorded quotes: 1) "Money simply represents wealth in rather the same way that the menu represents the dinner." 2) "[W]e confuse the world as it is with ... the world as it is described. ... And when we are not aware of ourselves except in a symbolic way, we're not related to ourselves at all. We are like people eating menus instead of dinners.") The concept is thus quite relevant throughout ontology and applied ontology regardless of any connection to general semantics per se (or absence thereof). Its avatars are thus encountered in semantics, statistics, logistics, business administration, semiotics, and many other applications.

A frequent coda to "all models are wrong" is that "all models are wrong (but some are useful)," which emphasizes the proper framing of recognizing map–territory differences—that is, how and why they are important, what to do about them, and how to live with them properly. The point is not that all maps are useless; rather, the point is simply to maintain critical thinking about the discrepancies: whether or not they are either negligible or significant in each context, how to reduce them (thus iterating a map, or any other model, to become a better version of itself), and so on.

== History ==
The phrase "a map is not the territory" was first introduced by Alfred Korzybski in his 1931 paper "A Non-Aristotelian System and Its Necessity for Rigour in Mathematics and Physics," presented at a meeting of the American Association for the Advancement of Science in New Orleans, and later reprinted in Science and Sanity (1933). Korzybski credits mathematician Eric Temple Bell for the related phrase, "the map is not the thing mapped." In the article, Korzybski states that "A map is not the territory it represents, but, if correct, it has a similar structure to the territory, which accounts for its usefulness."

The concept has been illustrated in various cultural works. Belgian surrealist René Magritte explored the idea in his painting The Treachery of Images, which depicts a pipe with the caption, "Ceci n'est pas une pipe" ("This is not a pipe"). Lewis Carroll, in Sylvie and Bruno Concluded (1893), describes a fictional map with a scale of "a mile to the mile", which proves impractical. Jorge Luis Borges similarly references a map as large as the territory in his short story "On Exactitude in Science" (1946). In his 1964 book Understanding Media, philosopher Marshall McLuhan argued that all media representations, including electronic media, are abstractions or "extensions" of reality.

The idea has influenced a number of modern works, including Robert M. Pirsig's Lila: An Inquiry into Morals and Michel Houellebecq's novel The Map and the Territory, the latter of which won the Prix Goncourt. The concept is also discussed in the work of Robert Anton Wilson and James A. Lindsay, who critiques the confusion of conceptual maps with reality in his book Dot, Dot, Dot: Infinity Plus God Equals Folly. Historian of religion Jonathan Z. Smith named one of the books collecting his essays Map Is Not Territory. Similarly, a collection of writings by AI researcher Eliezer Yudkowsky was named Map and Territory. David Foster Wallace's novel Infinite Jest uses the phrase during its Eschaton episode, in which a tennis-court simulation of nuclear geopolitics breaks down over confusion between the game's map and the "real world" territory it represents.

== Commentary ==
Gregory Bateson, in his 1972 work Steps to an Ecology of Mind, argued that understanding a territory is inherently limited by the sensory channels used to perceive it; e.g. due to one's own limited understanding of reality or merely local experiences of the greater picture. He described the "map" of reality as an imperfect representation:

We say the map is different from the territory. But what is the territory? Operationally, somebody went out with a retina or a measuring stick and made representations which were then put on paper. What is on the paper map is a representation of what was in the retinal representation of the man who made the map... The territory never gets in at all. Always, the process of representation will filter it out so that the mental world is only maps of maps, ad infinitum.

Bateson had explored this in "The Cybernetics of 'Self': A Theory of Alcoholism" (1971), arguing that a map's usefulness lies in its structural analogy to the territory, rather than its literal truthfulness. For example, even a cultural belief in colds being caused by spirits can function effectively as a "map" for public health, analogous to germ theory.

Philosopher David Schmidtz addresses the matter of accuracy in Elements of Justice (2006), highlighting how overly detailed models can become impractical, a problem also known as Bonini's paradox. Poet Paul Valéry summarized this idea: "Everything simple is false. Everything which is complex is unusable."

The rise of electronic media and Jean Baudrillard's concept of simulacra further complicates the map-territory distinction. In Simulacra and Simulation, Baudrillard argues that in the modern age, simulations precede and even replace reality, leading to the existence of the hyperreal:

Today abstraction is no longer that of the map, the double, the mirror, or the concept. Simulation is no longer that of a territory, a referential being or substance. It is the generation by models of a real without origin or reality: A hyperreal. The territory no longer precedes the map, nor does it survive it. It is nevertheless the map that precedes the territory—precession of simulacra—that engenders the territory.

== See also ==
- Allegory of the cave
- Blind men and an elephant
- Cargo cult
- Cartographic generalization
- Direct and indirect realism
- Fallacy of misplaced concreteness
- Richard Feynman
- Good regulator
- Stephen Jay Gould
- Ludic fallacy
- Mental model
- Mind projection fallacy
- Nominalism
- Non-Aristotelian logic
- On the Content and Object of Presentations
- Philosophy of perception
- Reification (fallacy)
- Signified and signifier
- Social constructionism
- Surrogation
- Thing-in-itself
- Use–mention distinction
- When a white horse is not a horse
