= Bonini's paradox =

As a model of a complex system becomes more complete, it becomes less understandable

Bonini's paradox, named after Stanford business professor Charles Bonini, explains the difficulty in constructing models or simulations that fully capture the workings of complex systems (such as the human brain).

== Statements ==
In modern discourse, the paradox was articulated by John M. Dutton and William H. Starbuck: "As a model of a complex system becomes more complete, it becomes less understandable. Alternatively, as a model grows more realistic, it also becomes just as difficult to understand as the real-world processes it represents."

This paradox may be used by researchers to explain why complete models of the human brain and thinking processes have not been created and will undoubtedly remain difficult for years to come.

This same paradox was observed earlier from a quote by philosopher-poet Paul Valéry (1871–1945): Ce qui est simple est toujours faux. Ce qui ne l’est pas est inutilisable ("If it's simple, it's always false. If it's not, it's unusable").

Richard Levins addresses this paradox in his classic essay "The Strategy of Model Building in Population Biology", stating that complex models have "too many parameters to measure, leading to analytically insoluble equations that would exceed the capacity of our computers, but the results would have no meaning for us even if they could be solved."

== Related issues ==
Bonini's paradox can be seen as a case of the map–territory relation: simpler maps are less accurate but more useful (e.g., Harry Beck's 1931 redesign of the London Underground map). An extreme negative example is given in the fictional stories Sylvie and Bruno Concluded and "On Exactitude in Science", which imagine a map of a scale of 1:1 (the same size as the territory), which is precise but unusable.

Isaac Asimov's fictional science of "Psychohistory" in his Foundation series faces this dilemma and is discussed by one of his psychohistorians.

== See also ==
- All models are wrong – Aphorism in statistics
- Lie-to-children – Teaching a complex subject via simpler models
- Map–territory relation – Relationship between an object and a representation of that object
- On Exactitude in Science – Short story by Jorge Luis Borges
- Strange loop – Cycles going through a hierarchy
- New mysterianism – Philosophical position on the mind-body problem
