= Hyperreality =

Term for cultural process of shifting ideas of reality

Hyperreality (HR) is a concept in post-structuralism that refers to the process of the evolution of notions of reality, leading to a cultural state of confusion between signs and symbols invented to stand in for reality, and direct perceptions of consensus reality. Hyperreality is seen as a condition in which, because of the compression of perceptions of reality in culture and media, what is generally regarded as real and what is understood as fiction are seamlessly blended together in experiences so that there is no longer any clear distinction between where one ends and the other begins.

The term was proposed by the French philosopher Jean Baudrillard, whose postmodern work contributed to a scholarly tradition in the field of communication studies that speaks directly to larger social concerns. Postmodernity was established through the social turmoil of the 1960s, spurred by social movements that questioned preexisting conventions and social institutions. Through the postmodern lens, reality is viewed as a fragmented, complimentary and polysemic system with components that are produced by social and cultural activity. Social realities that constitute consensus reality are constantly produced and reproduced, changing through the extended use of signs and symbols which hence contribute to the creation of a greater hyperreality.

== Origins and usage ==
The postmodern semiotic concept of hyperreality was contentiously coined by Baudrillard in Simulacra and Simulation (1981). Baudrillard defined "hyperreality" as "the generation by models of a real without origin or reality"; and his earlier book Symbolic Exchange and Death. Hyperreality is a representation; a sign without an original referent. According to Baudrillard, the commodities in this theoretical state do not have use-value as defined by Karl Marx but could be understood as signs as defined by Ferdinand de Saussure. He believes hyperreality goes further than confusing or blending the 'real' with the symbol which represents it; it involves creating a symbol or set of signifiers which represent something that does not actually exist, like Santa Claus. Baudrillard borrows, from Jorge Luis Borges' "On Exactitude in Science" (already borrowed from Lewis Carroll), the example of a society whose cartographers create a map so detailed that it covers the very things it was designed to represent. When the empire declines, the map fades into the landscape. He says that, in such a case, neither the representation nor the real remains, just the hyperreal.

Baudrillard's idea of hyperreality was heavily influenced by phenomenology, semiotics, and the philosophy of Marshall McLuhan. Baudrillard, however, challenges McLuhan's famous statement that "the medium is the message," by suggesting that information processes, cycles as well as recycles its own content. He also suggested that there is a difference between the media and reality and what they represent. Hyperreality is choice of consciousness with ability to distinguish one reality from another, especially in technologically advanced societies. However, Baudrillard's hyperreality theory goes a step further than McLuhan's medium theory: "There is not only an implosion of the message in the medium, there is, in the same movement, the implosion of the medium itself in the real, the implosion of the medium and of the real in a sort of hyperreal nebula, in which even the definition and distinct action of the medium can no longer be determined".

Italian author Umberto Eco explores the notion of hyperreality further by suggesting that the action of hyperreality is to desire reality and in the attempt to achieve that desire, to create an alternative reality that is to be explored as real. Linked to contemporary western culture, Umberto Eco and post-structuralists would argue that in current cultures, fundamental ideals are built on desire and particular sign-systems. Temenuga Trifonova from University of California, San Diego notes, "it is important to consider Baudrillard's texts as articulating an ontology rather than an epistemology."

== Significance ==
Hyperreality is significant as a paradigm to explain current cultural conditions. Consumerism, because of its reliance on sign exchange value (e.g. brand X shows that one is fashionable, car Y indicates one's wealth), could be seen as a contributing factor in the creation of hyperreality or the hyperreal condition. Hyperreality develops consciousness into exploring real awareness and emotional engagement, enhancing artificial simulations and alternative realities. Essentially (although Baudrillard himself may balk at the use of this word), fulfillment or happiness is found through realization and choice simulacrum of reality.

The effects of Hyperreality are more relevant in modern society, incorporating technological advancements like artificial intelligence, virtual reality and neurotechnology (simulated reality). This is attributed to the way it effectively captured the postmodern condition, particularly how people in the postmodern world seek stimulation by creating augmented worlds of spectacle and seduction and nothing more. There are dangers to the use of hyperreality in the general culture; individuals may observe and accept hyperreal images as role models when the images don't necessarily represent conscious people. This can result in a desire to strive for an unobtainable ideal, or it may lead to a lack of unimpaired role models.

Historian Daniel J. Boorstin cautions against confusing celebrity worship with hero worship, saying "we come dangerously close to depriving ourselves of all real models. We lose sight of the men and women who do not simply seem great because they are famous but who are known to be great regardless of celebrity status". He bemoans the loss of old heroes like Moses, Julius Caesar and Abraham Lincoln, who did not have public relations (PR) agencies to construct hyperreal images of themselves.

The dangers of hyperreality are also facilitated by information technologies, which provide tools to a broad audience that may or may not seek to encourage Hyperreality to drive consumption and materialism. The perception safeguarding Hyperreality becoming operated by the ignorance of a broad audience is that Hyperreality would then cease to exist within the reach of the broad audience who would then fall into limited and lesser alternatives. The danger in the pursuit of stimulation and seduction emerge not in the lack of meaning but, as Baudrillard maintained, "we are gorged with meaning and it is killing unconsciousness"

Hyperreality, some sources point out, may provide insights into the postmodern movement by analyzing how simulations disrupt the binary opposition between reality and illusion and has the ability to address or resolve contradictions within its own existence.

== Key relational themes ==
The concepts most fundamental to hyperreality are those of simulation and the simulacrum, first conceptualized by Jean Baudrillard in his book Simulacra and Simulation. The two terms are separate entities with relational origin connections to Baudrillard's theory of hyperreality.

=== Simulation ===
Simulation is characterized by a blending of 'reality' and representation, where there is no clear indication of where the former stops and the latter begins. Simulation is no longer that of a territory, a referential being, or a substance; "It is the generation by models of a real without origin or reality: a hyperreal." Baudrillard suggests that simulation no longer takes place in a physical realm; it takes place within a space not categorized by physical limits i.e., within ourselves, technological simulations, etc.

=== Simulacrum ===
The simulacrum is "an image without resemblance"; as Gilles Deleuze summarized as choice of forsaking of "True moral existence in order to enter into false aesthetic existence". However, Baudrillard argues that simulacrum is not self awareness and becomes—through sociocultural compression—corruption rejected due to its own inability to learn.

There are four steps of hyperreal reproduction:

1. Basic reflection of reality, i.e. in immediate perception
2. Perversion of reality, i.e. in representation
3. Pretense of reality, where there is no model
4. Simulacrum, which "bears no relation to any reality whatsoever"

=== Hyperstition ===
The concept of "hyperstition" as expounded upon by the English collective Cybernetic Culture Research Unit generalizes the notion of hyperreality to encompass the concept of "fictional entities that make themselves real." In Nick Land's own words:

Hyperstition is a positive feedback circuit including culture as a component. It can be defined as the experimental (techno-)science of self-fulfilling prophecies. Superstitions are merely false beliefs, but hyperstitions – by their very existence as ideas –function causally to bring about their own reality.

— Nick Land

The concept of hyperstition is also related to the concept of "theory-fiction", in which philosophy, critical theory and postmodern literature speculate on actual reality and engage with concepts for potentialities and virtualities. An oft-cited example of such a concept is cyberspace—originating in William Gibson's 1984 novel Neuromancer—which is a concept for the convergence between virtualities and actualities. By the mid-1990s, the realization of this concept had begun to emerge on a mass scale in the form of the internet.

=== Consequence ===
Hyperreality has been applied in media studies to examine how technologically mediated representations may complicate distinctions between representation and perceived reality. Baudrillard's work on media and simulation has been used to discuss circumstances in which representations of events may become difficult to distinguish from the events they purport to represent. The first is the possibility of various simulations being used to influence the audience, resulting in an inability to differentiate fiction from reality, which affects the overall truth value of a subject at hand. Scholars have also examined how mediated images can influence audiences' perceptions of people and events.

The audience can interpret different messages depending on the ideology of the entity behind an image. As a result, power equates to control over the media and the people. Celebrities, for example, have their photographs taken and altered so that the public can see the final result. The public then perceives celebrities based on what they have seen rather than how they truly are. It can progress to the point where celebrities appear completely different. As a result of celebrities' body modifications and editing, there has been an increase in surgeries and a decrease in self-esteem during adolescence. Because the truth is threatened, a similar outcome for hyperreality is possible.

== In culture ==
There is a strong link between media and the impact that the presence of hyperreality has on its viewers. This has been shown to blur the lines between artificial realities and reality, influencing the day-to-day experiences of those exposed to it. As hyperreality captures the inability to distinguish reality from a simulation of reality, common media outlets such as news, social media platforms, radio and television contribute to this misconception of true reality. Descriptions of the impact of hyperreality can be found in popular media. They present themselves as becoming blended with reality, which influences the experience of life and truth for its viewers.

Baudrillard, like Roland Barthes before him, explained that these impacts have a direct effect on younger generations who idolize the heroes, characters or influencers found on these platforms. As media is a social institution that shapes and develops its members within society, the exposure to hyperreality chosen within these platforms presents an everlasting effect. Baudrillard concludes that exposure to hyperreality over time will direct, from the conservative perspective of the institution itself, to a balanced perception of reality, in turn leading to choice of exploration including identity, originality and character.

=== Social media and public image ===
The hyperreality environment on the internet has shifted dramatically over the course of the COVID-19 pandemic, so much so that it influenced the Italian Stock Exchange in 2021.

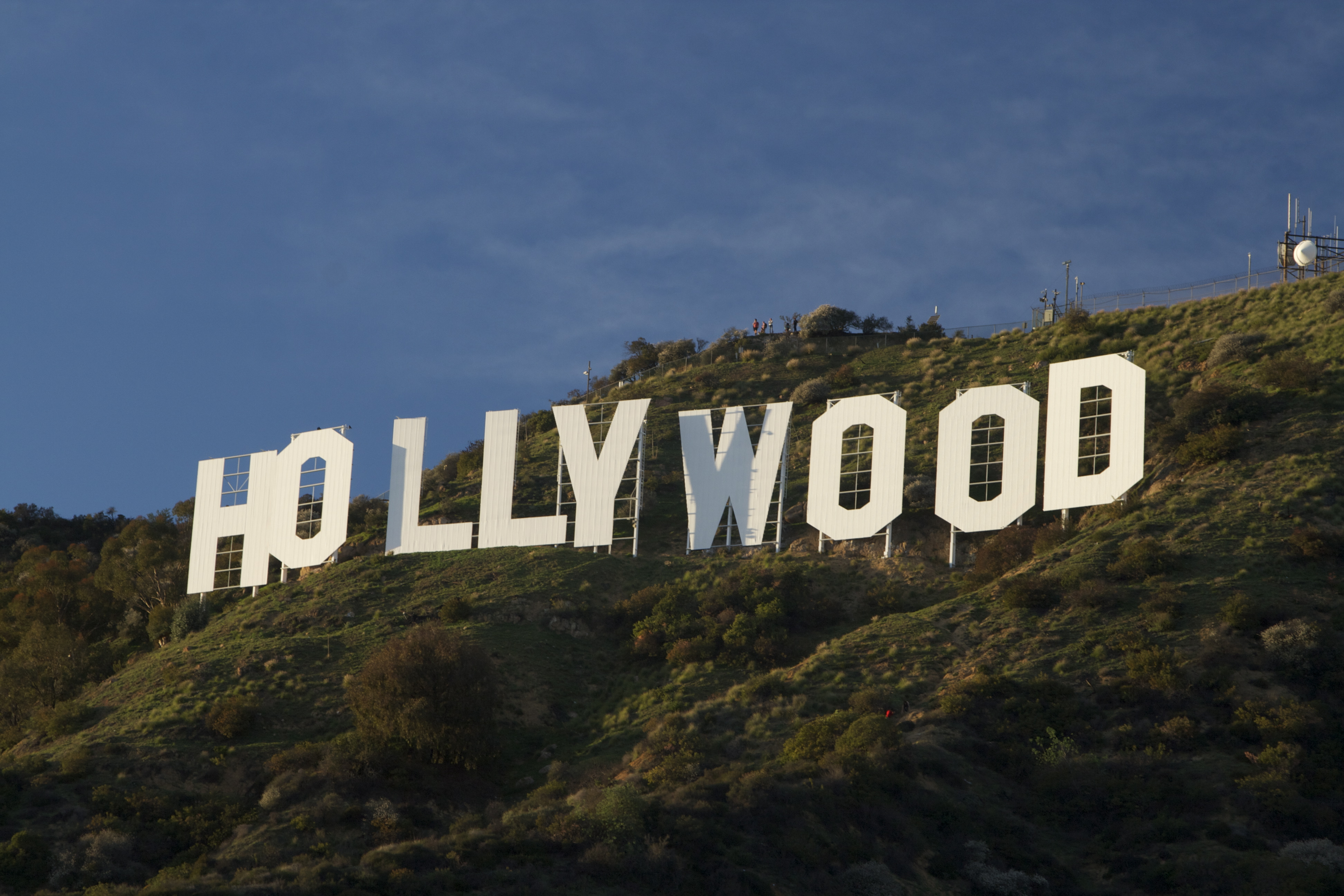
The Hollywood Sign

The Hollywood sign in Los Angeles, California, itself produces similar notions, but is more a symbol of a facet of hyperreality—the creation of a city with its main target being media production.

=== Disneyland ===
Both Umberto Eco and Jean Baudrillard refer to Disneyland as an example of hyperreality. Eco believes that Disneyland with settings such as Main Street and full-sized houses has been created to look "absolutely realistic", taking visitors' imagination to a "fantastic past". This false reality creates an illusion and makes it more desirable for people to buy this reality. Disneyland works in a system that enables visitors to feel that technology and the created atmosphere "can give us more reality than nature can". The "fake nature" of Disneyland satisfies people's imagination and daydream fantasies in real life. The idea is that nothing in this world is real. Nothing is original, but all are endless copies of reality. Since people do not imagine the reality of simulations, both imagined and real are equally hyperreal; for example, the numerous simulated rides, including the submarine ride and the Mississippi boat tour. When entering Disneyland, consumers form into lines to gain access to each attraction. Then they are ordered by people in special uniforms to follow rules, such as where to stand or sit. If consumers follow each rule correctly, they can enjoy "the real thing" and see things not available outside Disneyland's doors.

=== Examples ===
- Live virtual concerts using animated holographic projections, such as Miku Expo are a simulacrum of a music concert with an audience that treats fictional characters as real performers, such as Vocaloid idols or virtual bands like Gorillaz.
- A high end sex doll used as a simulacrum of an unattainable partner.
- Weak virtual reality.
- Works within the spectrum of the vaporwave musical genre often encompass themes of hyperreality through parody of the information revolution.
- Heidiland, is a region in eastern Switzerland named after the "Heidi" novels by Johanna Spyri, encompassing alpine landscapes, villages, and recreational areas inspired by the story's setting. The labels throughout the village attraction treat Heidi as a historical figure with few hints of make-believe.
- The restaurant Chain, which features nostalgic callbacks to real fast food chains (in particular Pizza Hut), is a pastiche of fast food restaurants from a previous era.

== See also ==
- Allegory of the cave – Allegory by Plato
- Augmented reality – Form of 3D computer interaction merging the real world with virtual objects
- Authenticity (philosophy) – Concept in existential psychology and philosophy
- Database consumption – Method of media consumption
- Escapism – Mental diversion from unpleasant or boring aspects of life
- Hyperconsumerism – Consumption of goods beyond ones necessities
- Hypersociability – Method of media consumption
- Immersion (virtual reality) – Perception of being physically present in a non-physical world
- Life imitating art – Philosophical position opposed to mimesis
- Marx's theory of alienation – Social theory developed by Karl Marx
