= Digital inheritance =

Passing down of digital assets after a person's death

Digital inheritance is the passing down of digital assets to designated (or undesignated) beneficiaries after a person’s death as part of the estate of the deceased. The process includes understanding what digital assets exist and navigating the rights for heirs to access and use those digital assets after a person has died.

Digital media play an increasingly important role in life. The media in which a digital inheritance resides can be fully owned by the deceased or under the control of a proprietary service provider. In contrast with physical assets, digital assets are ephemeral and subject to constant change. There are currently many obstacles to successful digital inheritance processes, as estate laws and privacy laws are still catching up with the way modern life is spent in the digital realm. Issues center around user privacy, intellectual property rights, and the legal liability of online corporations. With the average person having numerous online accounts, digital inheritance has become a complex issue.

Large online service providers are increasingly offering options for users to make decisions on what happens to their data, and who can access it, in the event of their death.

Digital inheritance processes can encourage the preservation of digital content that provides both sentimental value to descendants of the deceased and informational value to society's digital heritage.

== Overview ==
Digital inheritance is the passing down of digital assets to designated (or undesignated) beneficiaries after a person’s death as part of the estate of the deceased. What was traditionally passed down as physical assets – analog materials such as letters, financial paperwork, photographs, or books – now exist for many people almost entirely in digital form as email, online banking, digital photos, or e-books. In contrast with physical assets, digital assets are ephemeral and subject to constant threats of data corruption, format obsolescence, or licensing restrictions and proprietary control.

Digital media can be physically owned, such as those stored on personal computers, hard drives, or optical discs, in which case the digital content exists on a format which can easily be bequeathed and passed down to heirs. A growing majority of digital content and interactions, however, are stored in an online environment and not owned by the individual but by the company providing the online service or product. Examples of this include the online services provided by large corporations such as Google, Apple, Microsoft and Facebook. With the average person having 150 online accounts that require a password, digital inheritance has become a complex legal and ethical issue. Legal conflicts surrounding digital inheritance center around questions of intellectual property rights, user privacy, and estate law.

== Digital estate and digital assets ==
The term digital estate refers to the inheritable digital assets included in a person's estate. This includes the digital media itself as well as the rights to have control over that media. A person's digital assets may be digital media that a person owns outright or has the rights to use according to a terms of service agreement. Assets may be stored either online or offline and include online accounts, any form of writing, images and other created static or dynamic content, or any digital content that has economic value. They may include sensitive information, such as banking and medical records, or shared information, such as social media contacts or forums. In contrast with physical assets, digital assets, particularly those stored online, are always vulnerable to change or deletion.

Two principal issues arise over a person's digital estate. First, the inheritability of the digital content must be determined. Only digital content for which the deceased holds the copyright may be passed down to an inheritor. There is a distinction in law between full ownership and right-to-use licenses such as in software, digital music, film and books and there is legal precedent for denying resale or bequest of these. Second, the heir or administrator of an estate must be able to access the content. This sometimes means navigating any online contracts or service providers' terms of service agreements regarding their policies on user privacy and user death.

== Obstacles to digital inheritance ==
Estate laws and privacy laws do not yet fully address the challenges presented by the ubiquitous nature of modern life in the digital world. Online service providers, such as those for social media sites, email, and cloud storage services, use terms of service agreements to outline their privacy policies. These are then used in arguments against providing family members access to a deceased user's account. One legal argument makes a distinction between the ownership of an online account and the content that is created on that account: content created by a user, regardless of the platform it is created or displayed on, constitutes that user's intellectual property and should thus be considered inheritable as a digital asset.

In the United States, online service providers craft their terms of service agreements to remain compliant with the Stored Communications Act (SCA). Originally passed in 1986, the SCA sought to protect communication privacy by prohibiting service providers from disclosing a customer's electronically stored content to a third party. This includes potential beneficiaries of a digital estate.

=== Contracts ===
Contracts with service providers may be automatically terminated (by the terms of service) when a customer dies. This may mean that there is no right for heirs to access that data. This is compounded by the fact that many digital assets are only granted with non-transferable rights of use. For example, both Amazon and Apple only offer their digital products with single user rights. This means that digital products bought through such services can only be used by the purchaser, and cannot be passed on.

== Proposed solutions ==
Many solutions to the obstacles faced by digital inheritance have been proposed. One possible solution in the United States calls for a revision to the SCA allowing an exemption for digital estate beneficiaries. This would create less liability for online service providers and allow them to grant a beneficiary access to a deceased user's account as an authorized third party. Another possible solution would be an entirely new federal law regulating the handling of digital assets after death, in which the designated administrator of an estate would receive full access to the deceased user's online accounts. As estate law has traditionally been relegated to states, however, a proposed federal law would be a significant departure from current practice. A third possible solution proposes that online service providers present users with a list of options upon sign-up regarding the disposition of the user's content in case of death. This option would allow users to choose whether or not they desire their content to be preserved and to whom they would grant access, accommodating their right to privacy.

=== Revised Uniform Fiduciary Access to Digital Assets Act ===
As a response to the lack of both federal and state laws concerning digital inheritance, in 2015 the Uniform Law Commission released the Revised Uniform Fiduciary Access to Digital Assets Act (RUFADAA). This piece of legislation seeks to balance the interests of digital estate administrators and the privacy concerns of internet account users and service providers. The RUFADAA stipulates that a personal representative (estate administrator, fiduciary, or conservator) of an online account user has the right to access the user's electronic communications if the user had consented to this disclosure either via an online tool (such as Facebook's Legacy Contact feature or Google's Inactive Account Manager) or in a will. If neither of these forms of user consent are on file, an online service provider's terms of service agreement remains in effect and the provider has the right to deny a fiduciary access to electronic communications. As of 2021, 47 states have enacted the RUFADAA.

== Benefits of digital inheritance ==
A successfully implemented digital inheritance process has both personal and societal benefits which highlight the concept's importance. In the personal realm, family members' ability to access or receive copies of their deceased loved one's online content, such as social media profiles, blogs, and emails, has real sentimental value and can aid in the grieving process just as much as a person's physical objects. Additionally, any digital content that produced economic value for the original user may continue to do so if passed on to the user's heir(s).

Digital inheritance also has beneficial implications for the preservation of society's digital heritage. The passing on of digital estates necessitates that the content of digital assets be preserved either as copies or in its original functioning environment for an heir to receive. Digital inheritance therefore encourages proper digital preservation practices rather than allowing the content of deceased users to be abandoned and/or eventually deleted. Future generations will then be able to have a better understanding of this society's digital landscape.

== Practicalities ==
=== Digital estate plans ===
One method of ensuring that a digital inheritance is handled legally and comprehensively is to create a digital estate plan. This can be an informal plan or legally incorporated into a will in the form of digital will. The practical approach to is to keep a regular backup of digital assets in a secure place and appoint a single person who will postmortem deal with the assets. An up-to-date list of passwords to online accounts would be essential, as well as determining how each online account provider handles data access after a user's death.

=== Password managers ===
There are several services that securely store passwords, sending them to designated people after a user's death. Some of these send the customer an email from time to time, prompting to confirm that that person is still alive. Failure to respond to multiple emails makes the service provider assume that the person is deceased and they will disclose the passwords as previously requested. A company may require two verifiers who both must confirm the death, as well as providing a death certificate, before any passwords will be disclosed.

=== Digital inheritance services ===
There are services that facilitate passing social accounts and digital cryptocurrencies to the beneficiaries after one's passing. They allow users to connect their social accounts, file storage services, and bitcoin wallets to one "vault". The upside of such an approach is that no additional transfer of assets is necessary since transfer is happening on the connected service provider's side, thus keeping risks to the minimum.

=== Social media ===
Social media services have policies and processes to confirm the identity and death of a deceased user.

Twitter does not allow access to deceased user profiles. They will, however, deactivate an account for someone who is "authorized to act on the behalf of the estate, or with a verified immediate family member of the deceased" provides the user's death certificate and their own government-issued ID.

It is Facebook's policy to automatically memorialize a profile if they are made a aware of a user's death. Only verified immediate family members of the deceased may request that the account be fully deleted. If a user would like to decide what happens to their account upon their death, they have two options. In account settings, they can choose to have their account automatically deleted after death, or set up a legacy contact who will have the ability to manage their memorialized page. Facebook will not provide an account's login information to either a legacy contact or a family member.

Both Facebook and Twitter have been prey to hoax celebrity death announcements and memorial pages, as well as being entangled in legal battles for the rights to access a departed loved one's social profiles, leading to the need for official action and processes.

Google's tool for navigating user death is the Inactive Account Manager. Using this feature, a user can specify a trusted contact that will receive a notification if the user's account has been inactive for a specified amount of time. The user can also decide which data they would like their trusted contact to receive download access to. If a user has not set up a trusted contact in Inactive Account Manager prior to their death, Google will work with families on a case-by-case basis if data from the deceased user's account is requested.

Apple users can add a legacy contact to their Apple ID (this is a new feature included with iOS 15.2, iPadOS 15.2, and macOS 12.1). A legacy contact can access all data stored on a user's iCloud account for up to three years, after which the user's account is deleted. Legacy contacts cannot access any licensed media, in-app purchases, or payment and password information.

LinkedIn has a process for removing or memorializing the profiles of deceased members. The request may be initiated by someone with legal authority to act on behalf of the deceased and who has the proper documentation. Non-authorized individuals may simply report a user as deceased.

== Memorials ==
A digital estate memorial employs a combination of digital technology, including online memorials, for the benefit of the descendant's estate using various forms of communication, data storage and messaging to continue the legacy of the deceased as years progress. This includes services designed to continue contact with descendants with instructions or greetings from the passed. Some organizations ensure that digital inheritance will be protected in the event new technology emerges over periods of generational succession. This would include new applications of the digital inheritance lifestream as technological systems develop.

== See also ==
- Death and the internet
- Executor
- Literary executor
- Online identity
- Trustee
- Will (law)
