= Digital will =

Specialised type of will concerning digital assets

Digital wills are wills, often called a "Last Will and Testament", that determine the fate of a person's digital presence once they die. In the digital age, people have been wondering what happens to their digital presence once they die. These archives encompass any online account that a person may have such as social media, shopping sites, and gaming sites. Many websites now have a set of guidelines and procedures that can be followed to remove a deceased person's account from their servers. These procedures may vary from site to site. However, a digital will is a way to determine the fate of your online presence in one location instead of having to make arrangements with each site individually.

== Digital Executor ==
A digital executor is an individual responsible for managing an appointer's digital content. The digital executor is provided with a directive to instruct the executor on handling the appointer's digital assets.

== Obstacles and problems ==
Although digital wills are necessary and helpful, some problems and obstacles may be encountered. As identified in the Buffalo Law Review, obstacles include:

1. passwords, which online accounts cannot be accessed without, so if a loved one passes away, but does not pass along their account information, there is little hope of getting access to the accounts.
2. Encryption, which is changing information to hide something,
3. Federal and state criminal laws that penalize what is thought of as unauthorized access to computers and data, and
4. Federal and state privacy laws.

Terms and conditions of service must always be taken into account, which can cause problems if there are fine details or clauses that refer to what to do in the event of the account user's death. In some cases, the web service may have the ability to terminate the account and delete all data, and if other people besides the user gain access, there may be criminal charges placed against them, even if the one who died has passed on the password to them. Identity theft can potentially continue to be a problem even after death if their information is released to the wrong people. This is why online networks and digital executors require proof of death such as a certificate from a family member of the deceased person in order to acquire access to accounts. There are instances when access may still be denied, because of the prevalence of false death certificates.

== Controversy ==
In Delaware, the “Fiduciary Access to Digital Assets and Digital Accounts Act” was signed into law. That Act states that a beneficiary that has control over digital accounts or digital assets will have the same rights as the initial account holder. This law trumps conflicting terms of service agreements from online service providers or custodians, such as Yahoo.

== See also ==
- Death and the Internet
- Digital inheritance
