= Online mourning =

Grieving via the Internet or social media

Online mourning describes grieving on the internet. It represents not a revolution in mourning, but rather a shift in the medium mourners utilize to express their grief and memorialize the deceased. This shift has occurred in tandem with the widespread popularity of social media in the West, a result of which has been the need for users to accept death within an online environment. It is estimated that by 2012, 30 million Facebook users had died. Online mourning does not occur exclusively on social media websites. There are websites such as Memories.net and Legacy.com dedicated to hosting obituaries and capturing the life stories of deceased loved ones. Two distinct types of online mourning have been identified, high-profile cases that draw attention from a broad online community, and profiles posthumously recreated and reframed as a medium to memorialize the deceased.

== History ==
Since the advent of newspapers, the obituary became a preferred method of memorializing the deceased. Until recently, obituaries were one of the most read sections of the newspaper. As new media technologies such as radio and television were created, the obituary adapted to best reflect capabilities available in the new communication media. Authors Brian Carroll and Katie Landry have argued that the appearance of online mourning reflects a logical progress of mourning via social media networks through use of new media. Changes to the obituary as it adapts over media include an exponential increase in information about the deceased, and the content reaching a wider geographic audience. The occurrence of online mourning presents a new paradigm in the memorialization process by providing interactive, sometimes competitive documents for mourners. Studies of Facebook and Myspace indicate that while the majority of living users visit memorialized profile accounts immediately after learning of an individual’s death, visitation often continues long after, albeit less frequently.

There have been so many cases of online memorialization that it has resulted in the creation of websites such as MyDeathSpace.com, which attempt to create a catalogue of memorializations available on social media websites. Dead users with active profiles became problematic due to the inability of social media algorithms to recognize a user is deceased. In 2009, Facebook addressed this issue updating its policy to include an outline for handling user deaths through switching dead users’ profiles to memorial statuses.

== Interaction with the deceased ==
As previously mentioned, online mourning presents a new aspect of mourning by allowing users to interact with the memorialization of the deceased. By posting to a memorialized individual, mourners can celebrate the life of the deceased, connect to each other, and facilitate closure. Studies of mourners’ interactions with memorialized profile pages have identified distinct themes of interaction with the deceased:

- Cursory comments that provide digital tokens of mourning
- Admiration or praise of the deceased
- Petitioning the deceased for guidance
- Narrative or biographical record of the deceased
- Describing and reinforcing the values of the deceased

== See also ==
- Find a Grave – allows online memorials and tributes
- Virtual cemetery
