= Death tech =

Use of modern technologies in funeral industry

Death tech or death technology are the use of modern technologies in funeral industry and other issues related to death, dying and deceased. These include such things as handling of will writing, planning, funerals, inheritance of digital assets, and human composting.

One aspect of Death tech is "digital afterlife": the presence of the deceased persona in the Internet.

== See also ==
- Farewill
- Digital immortality
- Thanatosensitivity
- Past Post
