= Simulacra and Simulation =

1981 book by Jean Baudrillard

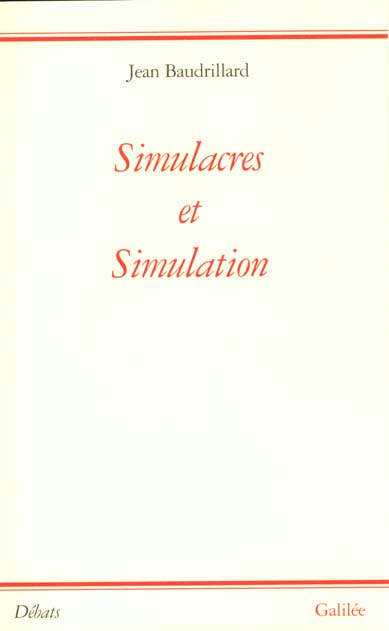
- Cover of the first edition
- Author: Jean Baudrillard
- Original title: Simulacres et Simulation
- Translators: Paul Foss, Paul Batton & Philip Beitchman
- Language: French
- Subject: Simulacra, semiotics
- Publisher: Éditions Galilée (French) & Semiotext(e) (English)
- Publication date: 1981
- Publication place: France
- English publication date: 1983
- Media type: Print (Paperback)
- Pages: 164 pp
- ISBN: 2-7186-0210-4 (French) & ISBN 0-472-06521-1 (English)
- OCLC: 7773126
- Dewey Decimal: 194 19
- LC Class: BD236 .B38

Simulacra and Simulation (French: Simulacres et Simulation) is a 1981 philosophical essay by the philosopher and cultural theorist Jean Baudrillard, in which he seeks to examine the relationships between reality, symbols, and society, in particular the significations and symbolism of culture and media involved in constructing an understanding of shared existence.

Simulacra are copies that depict things that either had no original, or that no longer have an original. Simulation is the imitation of the operation of a real-world process or system over time.

== Summary ==
=== Definition ===
...The simulacrum is never that which conceals the truth—it is the truth which conceals that there is none. The simulacrum is true.

Simulacra and Simulation is most known for its discussion of symbols, signs, and how they relate to contemporaneity (simultaneous existences). Baudrillard claims that current society has replaced all reality and meaning with symbols and signs, and that human experience is a simulation of reality. These simulacra are not merely mediations of reality, nor even deceptive mediations of reality. They are not based in a reality nor do they hide a reality, they simply hide that nothing like reality is relevant to people's current understanding of their lives.

The simulacra that Baudrillard refers to are the significations and symbolism of culture and media that construct perceived reality, the acquired understanding by which human life and shared existence are rendered legible. These ideas had appeared earlier in Guy Debord's 1967 The Society of the Spectacle. Baudrillard believed that society had become so saturated with these simulacra and human life so saturated with the constructs of society that all meaning was becoming meaningless by being infinitely mutable; he called this phenomenon the "precession of simulacra".

=== Stages ===
Simulacra and Simulation delineates the sign-order into four stages:

1. The first stage is a faithful image/copy, where people believe, and may even be correct to believe, that a sign is a "reflection of a profound reality", this is a good appearance, in what Baudrillard called "the sacramental order".
2. The second stage is perversion of reality, where people come to believe that the sign is an unfaithful copy, which "masks and denatures" reality as an "evil appearance—it is of the order of maleficence". Here, signs and images do not faithfully reveal reality to us, but can hint at the existence of an obscure reality which the sign itself is incapable of encapsulating.
3. The third stage masks the absence of a profound reality, where the sign pretends to be a faithful copy, but it is a copy with no original. Signs and images claim to represent something real, but no representation is taking place and arbitrary images are merely suggested as things which they have no relationship to. Baudrillard calls this the "order of sorcery", a regime of semantic algebra where all human meaning is conjured artificially to appear as a reference to the (increasingly) hermetic truth.
4. The fourth stage is pure simulacrum, in which the simulacrum has no relationship to any reality whatsoever. Here, signs merely reflect other signs and any claim to reality on the part of images or signs is only of the order of other such claims. This is a regime of total equivalency, where cultural products need no longer even pretend to be real in a naïve sense, because the experiences of consumers' lives are so predominantly artificial that even claims to reality are expected to be phrased in artificial, "hyperreal" terms. Any naïve pretension to reality as such is perceived as bereft of critical self-awareness, and thus as oversentimental.

=== Degrees ===
Simulacra and Simulation identifies three types of simulacra and identifies each with a historical period:

1. First order, associated with the premodern period, where representation is clearly an artificial placemarker for the real item. The uniqueness of objects and situations marks them as irreproducibly real and signification obviously gropes towards this reality.
2. Second order, associated with the modernity of the Industrial Revolution, where distinctions between representation and reality break down due to the proliferation of mass-reproducible copies of items, turning them into commodities. The commodity's ability to imitate reality threatens to replace the authority of the original version, because the copy is just as "real" as its prototype.
3. Third order, associated with the postmodernity of Late Capitalism, where the simulacrum precedes the original and the distinction between reality and representation vanishes. There is only the simulation, and originality becomes a totally meaningless concept.

==== Second order ====
Part of the three-order simulacra, the second-order simulacra, a term coined by Jean Baudrillard, are symbols of a non-faithful representation of the original. Here, signs and images do not faithfully show reality, but might hint at the existence of something real which the sign itself is incapable of encapsulating.

The first-order simulacrum is a faithful copy of the original and the third order are symbols that have come to be without referents, that is, symbols with no real object to represent, but that pretend to be a faithful copy of an original. Third-order simulacra are symbols in themselves, taken for reality, and a further layer of symbolism is added. This occurs when the symbol is taken to be more important or authoritative than the original entity, when authenticity has been replaced by copy, thus reality is replaced by a substitute.

The consequence of the propagation of second-order simulacra is that, within the affected context, nothing is "real", though those engaged in the illusion are incapable of seeing it. Instead of having experiences, people observe spectacles, via real or metaphorical control screens. Instead of the real, there is simulation and simulacra, the hyperreal.

In his essay The Precession of the Simulacra, Baudrillard recalls a tale from a short story by Borges in which a king requests a map (i.e., a symbol) to be produced so detailed that it ends up coming into one-to-one correspondence with the territory (i.e., the real area the map is to represent); this references the philosophical concept of map–territory relation. Baudrillard argues that in the postmodern epoch, the territory ceases to exist, and there is nothing left but the map; or indeed, the very concepts of the map and the territory have become indistinguishable, the distinction which once existed between them having been erased.

Among the many issues associated with the propagation of second-order simulacra to the third-order is what Baudrillard considers the termination of history. The method of this termination comes through the lack of oppositional elements in society, with the mass having become "the silent majority", an imploded concept which absorbs images passively, becoming itself a media overwritten by those who speak for it, i.e., the people are symbolically represented by governing agents and market statistics, marginalizing the people themselves. For Baudrillard, this is the natural result of an ethic of unity in which actually agonistic opposites are taken to be essentially the same. For example, Baudrillard contends that moral universalism (human rights, equality) is equated with globalization, which is not concerned with immutable values but with mediums of exchange and equalisation such as the global market and mass media.

=== Phenomena ===
Baudrillard theorizes that the lack of distinctions between reality and simulacra originates in several phenomena:

1. Contemporary media including television, film, print, and the Internet, which are responsible for blurring the line between products that are needed (in order to live a life) and products for which a need is created by commercial images.
2. Exchange value, in which the value of goods is based on money (literally denominated fiat currency) rather than usefulness, and moreover usefulness comes to be quantified and defined in monetary terms in order to assist exchange.
3. Multinational capitalism, which separates produced goods from the plants, minerals and other original materials and the processes (including the people and their cultural context) used to create them.
4. Urbanization, which separates humans from the nonhuman world, and re-centres culture around productive throughput systems so large they cause alienation.
5. Language and ideology, in which language increasingly becomes caught up in the production of power relations between social groups, especially when powerful groups institute themselves at least partly in monetary terms.

=== Analogies ===
A specific analogy that Baudrillard uses is a fable derived from "On Exactitude in Science" by Jorge Luis Borges. In it, a great Empire created a map that was so detailed it was as large as the Empire itself. The actual map was expanded and destroyed as the Empire itself conquered or lost territory. When the Empire crumbled, all that was left was the map. In Baudrillard's rendition, it is conversely the map that people live in, the simulation of reality where the people of the Empire spend their lives ensuring their place in the representation is properly circumscribed and detailed by the map-makers; conversely, it is reality that is crumbling away from disuse.

The transition from signs which dissimulate something to signs which dissimulate that there is nothing, marks the decisive turning point. The first implies a theology of truth and secrecy (to which the notion of ideology still belongs). The second inaugurates an age of simulacra and simulation, in which there is no longer any God to recognize his own, nor any last judgment to separate truth from false, the real from its artificial resurrection, since everything is already dead and risen in advance.

When Baudrillard refers to the "precession of simulacra" in Simulacra and Simulation, he is referring to the way simulacra have come to precede the real in the sense mentioned above, rather than to any succession of historical phases of the image. Referring to "On Exactitude in Science", he argued that just as for contemporary society the simulated copy had superseded the original object, so, too, the map had come to precede the geographic territory (cf. Map–territory relation), e.g. the first Gulf War (which Baudrillard later used as an object demonstration in The Gulf War Did Not Take Place): the image of war preceded real war. War comes not when it is made by sovereign against sovereign, not when killing for attritive and strategic neutralisation purposes is authorised; nor even, properly speaking, when shots are fired; rather, war comes when society is generally convinced that it is coming.

Henceforth, it is the map that precedes the territory—precession of simulacra—it is the map that engenders the territory and if we were to revive the fable today, it would be the territory whose shreds are slowly rotting across the map.

== Reception ==
=== Academia and pop culture ===
The work has sparked interest in academia, with many researchers building upon the concept laid down by Baudrillard.

Many have applied Baudrillard terminology to the study of modern and contemporary works of fiction.

Some specific examples include:

- Day Zero, a novel by C. Robert Cargill, examined in "Simulacrum and Hyperreality in Cargill's Day Zero: A Critical Postmodern Study"
- The Matrix movie, which is considered to be an "interpretative grid" for Baudrillard's theory. Simulacra and Simulation was issued to the cast as a required reading prior to the making of the movie, and the book appears in one scene. Baudrillard was reported to be very disappointed by the film, however.
- Ex-Machina (2014) in the matter of techno-orientalism
- finally, and most broadly, to science fiction as a genre

In "Baudrillard's Obscenity," Vivian Sobchack notes:

There's nothing like a little pain to bring us (back) to our senses—and to reveal Baudrillard's apocalyptic descriptions of the postmodern techno-body as dangerously partial and naively celebratory. Baudrillard's techno-body is a body that is thought always as an object, and never lived as a subject. Thus it can bear all sorts of symbolic abuse with indiscriminate and undifferentiated pleasure. This techno-body is a porno-graphic fiction, objectified and written beyond belief and beyond the real—which is to say, it is always something "other" than Baudrillard's own body which he lives (even as he refuses to believe it) as "real" and "mine." One's own body resists the kind of affectless objectification that Baudrillard has in mind; rather, it responds affectively to such mortification as he imagines with confusion, horror, anguish, and pain. Even its defensive or offensive "numbness" is physically and affectively lived—and felt.

Thus providing a counter argument to Baudrillard's simulacra, or techno-body, while recognizing the value of the framework.

=== Baudrillard himself ===
Baudrillard himself noted that many read his writing on the 'three orders' of the image with excessive seriousness. In the postface of his To forget Foucault (Original: Oublier Foucault), Baudrillard's interviewer Sylvère Lotringer suggested that Baudrillard's approach to "The Order of the Simulacra" was "pretty close" to that of Michel Foucault who "wrote the archaeology of things", to which Baudrillard replied:

You're talking about the three orders? I could have made a book out of it, others rushed in to find examples. As for myself, without denying it, I don't believe it holds up. For a time I believed in Foucauldian genealogy, but the order of simulation is antinomical to genealogy.

== See also ==
- Desert of the real
