= Virtual funeral =

Online funeral service

A virtual funeral is a funeral ceremony streamed online. This type of ceremony became widespread during the COVID-19 pandemic due to the public health restrictions. For a virtual funeral, people often use an online video conference platform, such as Zoom, Skype, or Google Meet.

== See also ==
- Online memorial
