= Welcome to the Desert of the Real =

2002 philosophy book by Slavoj Žižek

Welcome to the Desert of the Real: Five Essays on September 11.
- Author: Slavoj Žižek
- Language: English
- Subject: September 11 attacks
- Publisher: Verso Books
- Publication date: 2002
- Publication place: United States
- Media type: Print
- Pages: 154
- ISBN: 978-1-85984-421-2
- Preceded by: Repeating Lenin (2001)
- Followed by: Revolution at the Gates: Žižek on Lenin, the 1917 Writings (2002)

Welcome to the Desert of the Real is a 2002 book by Slavoj Žižek. A Marxist and Lacanian analysis of the ideological and political responses to the terrorist attacks on September 11, 2001, Zizek's study incorporates various psychoanalytic, postmodernist, biopolitical, and (Christian) universalist influences into a Marxist dialectical framework.

== Etymology ==
The book's title comes from a quote delivered by the character Morpheus in the 1999 film The Matrix: "Welcome to the desert of the real". Both Žižek's title and the line from The Matrix refer to a phrase in Jean Baudrillard's Simulacra and Simulation. Part of this phrase appears in the following context of the book:

If once we were able to view the Borges fable in which the cartographers of the Empire draw up a map so detailed that it ends up covering the territory exactly [...] this fable has now come full circle for us, and possesses nothing but the discrete charm of second-order simulacrum [...] It is the real, and not the map, whose vestiges persist here and there in the deserts that are no longer those of the Empire, but ours. The desert of the real itself.

Early in The Matrix, Neo used a hollowed-out book with the title Simulacra and Simulation to hide an illegal data disc which appeared in an early scene of the film. Later in the film, Morpheus utters these words after the main character Neo wakes up from his computer-generated virtual reality, experiencing the Real as a desolate, war-torn, yet spectacular geography. For Žižek, this represents a prime example of the 20th century's "passion for the Real," for which the terrorist attacks of 9/11 were the ultimate artistic expression. His argument is that because this passion was sublimated into the postmodern "passion for the semblance," Americans experienced the "return of the Real" in exactly the same way as Neo did in the film, i.e., as a nightmarish virtual landscape or "reality as the ultimate 'effect.'"

== Overview ==
Žižek argues that global capitalism and fundamentalism are two parts of the same whole: ultimately, their opposition in political and everyday discourses represents a false ideological conflict in both the Marxian and psychoanalytic senses. This is just a continuation of the prior cultural logic in which fascism served as the "obscene superego supplement" or fantasy to liberal democracy's Reality.

Žižek shows how today the fundamentalist terrorist plays an analogous symbolic role to the Jew during the Holocaust, the excluded "other" whose alien presence legitimizes measures of internal discipline. Although Americans were victims, so were the attacking terrorists, and therefore neither side was justified in their violent actions. In fact, the attacks were already libidinally invested by a series of Hollywood catastrophe films, showing that it was exactly what Americans secretly wanted, i.e., their ultimate spectacular experience. The false perception of a purely external threat allowed the system of global capitalism to go essentially unchallenged, functioning to indefinitely defer discussion about alternative socioeconomic futures. The only real "other" to global capitalism is a renewed form of socialism, because the "others" of capitalism (those excluded from capitalism's benefits) are almost everyone, even though they are all formally extended the promise of liberal rights.

While the United States claims to be standing for democratic rights and principles, it actually suspended these same rights at home and legitimized torture in order to fight the war on terror. Rather than seeing these as real exceptions, Žižek identifies them as central tendencies in liberal democracy, a system inherently susceptible to corruption and unable to universalize its own rights. Changing conditions of war further erode any distinctions that could be made between a state of war or exception and a state of peace, central distinctions in democratic ideology.

Because the democratic system is always generating new states of emergency to justify the negation of its ethical principles, the future of emancipatory politics cannot be contained within a liberal democratic framework (including notions of human rights, the rule of law, and constitutionality). As ethical acts such as Israeli "peacenik" soldiers' solidarity with their Palestinian neighbors show, there are other alternatives to capitalism than fundamentalism or fascism; however, the current paradigm of the "end of history" and the "clash of civilizations" restricts the range of apparent conflicts to cultural or ethnic/religious ones, masking anything more fundamental, such as an economic conflict.

The same displacement of socio-economic conflict that occurred under fascism is mirrored in the Israel-Palestinian conflict, the "symptomal knot" of all the economic and cultural logics of the contemporary world. In his rejection of binary ethical choices and predictive certainty, Žižek is certainly postmodernist, but the substance of his critique of responses to 9/11 is primarily Marxian and secondarily Lacanian.

== Reception ==
Loren Glass argues from a historical materialist and autonomist perspective that Žižek's critique is stronger than other critical theoretical responses (such as those of Jean Baudrillard and Paul Virilio) because it is "cautiously optimistic" about the possibility for ethical action, whereas other critics have remained pessimistic. In his view, "a larger political programme, a sort of geopolitical act of refusal," at least presents a practical possibility for 21st century activists.

However, Glass criticizes Žižek for (like Baudrillard and Virillo) mirroring Rightist apocalyptic rhetoric by focusing on "glitzy" events rather than slow-building historical processes. And furthermore, he argues against Žižek's use of the "placeholder" concept of the Real because it represents a retreat "from an earlier materialist confidence in the methodological accessibility of historical experience," and against the appropriation of elements of Christianity (e.g. the injunction to "love thy neighbour" contained in the peaceniks' ethical act), which Glass deems unnecessary in Marxist praxis.

== See also ==
- "On Exactitude in Science"
- Desert (philosophy)
- Marxism and religion § Christianity

== Sources ==
- International Journal of Žižek Studies
- Glass, Oren (2008). "The Spirit of Terrorism Ground Zero Welcome to the Desert of the Real America's Culture of Terrorism: Violence, Capitalism, and the Written Word Afflicted Powers: Capital and Spectacle in a New Age of War Portents of the Real: A Primer for Post-9/11 America". Historical Materialism. 16 (2): 217–229. doi:10.1163/156920608X296141.
- Slavoj Žižek. Welcome to the Desert of the Real, London and New York: Verso, October 2002.
- Lana and Lilly Wachowski (Dir.). The Matrix. 1999.
