= All models are wrong =

Aphorism in statistics

"All models are wrong" is a common aphorism in statistics, and science more generally. It is often expanded as "All models are wrong, but some are useful". The aphorism acknowledges that statistical models always fall short of the complexities of reality but can still be useful nonetheless. The aphorism is generally attributed to George E. P. Box, a British statistician, although the underlying concept predates Box's writings.

== History ==
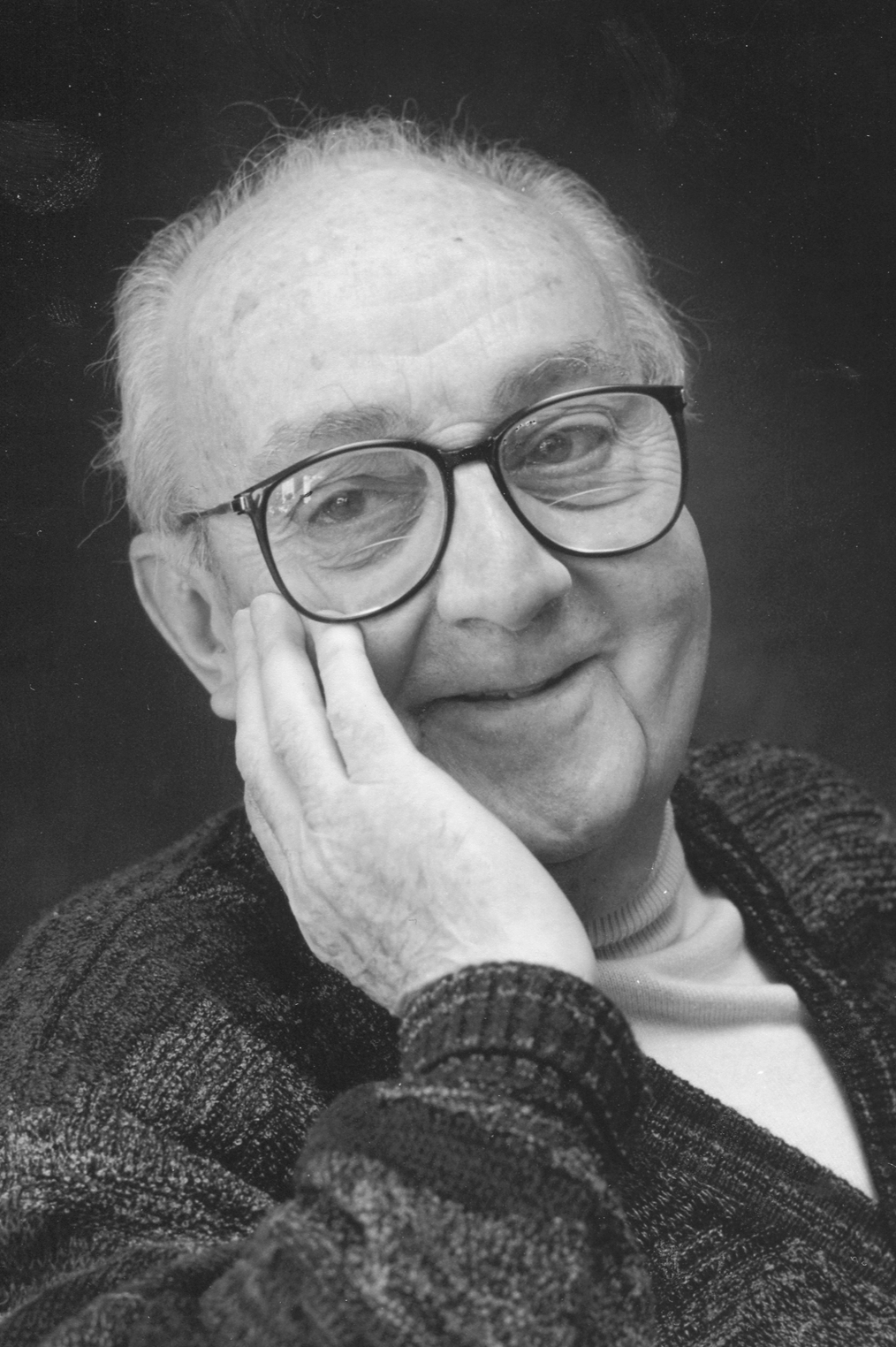
The phrase is attributed to George Box

The phrase "all models are wrong" was attributed to George Box who used the phrase in a 1976 paper to refer to the limitations of models, arguing that while no model is ever completely accurate, simpler models can still provide valuable insights if applied judiciously.

In their 1983 book on generalized linear models, Peter McCullagh and John Nelder stated that while modeling in science is a creative process, some models are better than others, even though none can claim eternal truth. In 1996, an Applied Statistician's Creed was proposed by M.R. Nester, which incorporated the aphorism as a central tenet.

The longer form appears on in a 1987 book by Box and Norman Draper in a section "The Use of Approximating Functions,":

"The fact that the polynomial is an approximation does not necessarily detract from its usefulness because all models are approximations. Essentially, all models are wrong, but some are useful."

== Discussions ==
Box used the aphorism again in 1979, where he expanded on the idea by discussing how models serve as useful approximations, despite failing to perfectly describe empirical phenomena. He reiterated this sentiment in his later works, where he discussed how models should be judged based on their utility rather than their absolute correctness.

David Cox, in a 1995 commentary, argued that stating all models are wrong is unhelpful, as models by their nature simplify reality. He emphasized that statistical models, like other scientific models, aim to capture important aspects of systems through idealized representations.

In their 2002 book on statistical model selection, Burnham and Anderson reiterated Box's statement, noting that while models are simplifications of reality, they vary in usefulness, from highly useful to essentially useless.

J. Michael Steele used the analogy of city maps to explain that models, like maps, serve practical purposes despite their limitations, emphasizing that certain models, though simplified, are not necessarily wrong. In response, Andrew Gelman acknowledged Steele's point but defended the usefulness of the aphorism, particularly in drawing attention to the inherent imperfections of models.

Philosopher Peter Truran, in a 2013 essay, discussed how seemingly incompatible models can make accurate predictions by representing different aspects of the same phenomenon, illustrating the point with an example of two observers viewing a cylindrical object from different angles.

In 2014, David Hand reiterated that models are meant to aid in understanding or decision-making about the real world, a point emphasized by Box's famous remark.

== See also ==
- Anscombe's quartet – Four data sets with the same descriptive statistics, yet very different distributions
- Bonini's paradox – As a model of a complex system becomes more complete, it becomes less understandable
- Lie-to-children – Teaching a complex subject via simpler models
- Map–territory relation – Relationship between an object and a representation of that object
- Pragmatism – Philosophical tradition
- Reification (fallacy) – Fallacy of treating an abstraction as if it were a real thing
- Scientific modelling – Scientific activity that produces models
- Statistical model – Type of mathematical model
- Statistical model validation – Evaluating whether a chosen statistical model is appropriate or not
- Verisimilitude – Resemblance to reality
