= Death and the Internet =

Digital content of people who died

A recent extension to the cultural relationship with death is the increasing number of people who die having created a large amount of digital content, such as social media profiles, that will remain after death. This may result in concern and confusion, because of automated features of dormant accounts (e.g. birthday reminders), uncertainty of the deceased's preferences that profiles be deleted or left as a memorial, and whether information that may violate the deceased's privacy (such as email or browser history) should be made accessible to family.

Issues with how this information is sensitively dealt with are further complicated as it may belong to the service provider (not the deceased) and many do not have clear policies on what happens to the accounts of deceased users. While some sites, including Facebook and X (formerly Twitter), have policies related to death, others remain dormant until if applicable, deleted due to inactivity or transferred to family or friends. The FADA (Fiduciary Access to Digital Assets Act) was set in place to make it possible to transfer digital possessions legally.

More broadly, the heavy increase in social media use is affecting cultural practices surrounding death. "Virtual funerals" and other forms of previously physical memorabilia are being introduced into the digital world, complete with public details of a person's life and death.

== E-mail ==
Gmail and Hotmail allow the email accounts of the deceased to be accessed provided certain requirements are met. Yahoo! Mail will not provide access, citing the No Right of Survivorship and Non-Transferability clause in the Yahoo! terms of service. In 2005, Yahoo! was ordered by the Probate Court of Oakland County, Michigan, to release emails of deceased US Marine Justin Ellsworth to his father, John Ellsworth.

== By website ==
=== Facebook ===
==== Policies ====
In its early days, Facebook used to delete profiles of dead people, but does not anymore. In October 2009, the company introduced "memorial pages" in response to multiple user requests related to the 2007 Virginia Tech shooting. After receiving a proof of death via a special form, the profile would be converted into a tribute page with minimal personal details, where friends and family members could share their grief.

In February 2015, Facebook allowed users to appoint a friend or family member as a "legacy contact" with the rights to manage their page after death. It also gave Facebook users an option to have their account permanently deleted when they die.

As of January 2019, all 3 options were active.

==== Controversies ====
In 2013, BuzzFeed criticized Facebook for the lack of control over memorialization that resulted in a "Facebook death" prank aimed at locking users out of their own accounts.

In 2017, Reuters reported that a German court rejected a mother's demand to access her deceased daughter's memorialized account stating that the right to private telecommunications outweighed the right to inheritance. In July 2018, Dubai's DIFC Courts ruling clarified that Facebook, Twitter and other social media accounts should be bequeathed in legally binding will.

Social media networks have also been criticized for not responding to relatives' requests to alter information on memorialized accounts. Another criticism is that Facebook users often are unaware that their content is ultimately owned not by them, but by Facebook.

=== Dropbox ===
==== Policies ====
Dropbox determines inactive accounts by looking at sign-ins, file shares, and file activity over the previous 12 months. Once an account is determined inactive, Dropbox deletes the files on the account. To request access to the account of a deceased person, heirs are required to send appropriate documents by physical mail.

=== Google ===
==== Policies ====
In April 2013, Google announced the creation of the 'Inactive Account Manager', which allows users of Google services to set up a process in which ownership and control of inactive accounts is transferred to a delegated user.

Google also allows users to submit a range of requests regarding accounts belonging to deceased users. Google works with immediate family members and representatives to close online accounts in some cases once a user is known to be deceased, and in certain circumstances may also provide content from a deceased user's account.

=== X (formerly Twitter) ===
==== Policies ====
Until 2010, Twitter (launched in July 2006) did not have a policy on handling deceased user accounts, and simply deleted timelines of deceased users. In August 2010, Twitter allowed memorialization of accounts upon request from family members, and also provided them with an option of either deleting the account or obtaining a permanent backup of the deceased user's public tweets.

In 2014, Twitter updated its policy to include an option to delete deceased user photographs. This policy was implemented after multiple Twitter trolls sent Zelda Williams, daughter of Robin Williams, photoshopped images of her father.

As of January 2019, the only option that Twitter offered for the accounts of dead people was account deactivation. Previously published content is not removed. To deactivate an account Twitter requires an immediate family member to present a copy of their ID and a death certificate of the deceased. Twitter specified that it does not provide account access to anyone, but does allow people having account login information to continue posting. A prominent example is Roger Ebert's account maintained by his wife Chaz.

==== Controversies ====
In 2012, The Next Web columnist Martin Bryant noticed that since Twitter, unlike Facebook, did not have a "one account per real person" emphasis, memorializing accounts presented a difficulty to the service. He also criticized the service for the lack of control over hacking of such accounts and disapproved the practice of passing dead people's usernames to new owners after a certain period of inactivity.

In 2013, Variety ran a feature about Cory Monteith's Twitter account that had 1.5 million followers at the moment on his death and gained almost 1 million new followers afterwards. Monteith's fans also launched #DontDeleteCorysTwitter campaign. As of February 2019, the celebrity's account had 1.63 million followers.

Various media reported incidents related to automatic posting and account hacking.

=== iTunes ===
==== Policies ====
iCloud and iTunes accounts are "non transferable" since the content is not owned — users only have a licence to access it.

=== Wikipedia ===
Wikipedia has guidelines concerning the accounts and pages of deceased contributors. After validating the death of the editor, the defunct's user page is fully edit-protected to prevent vandalism. A note indicating the death may also be placed at the top of their user page, depending on the wishes of their family.

Prolific users having made either several hundred edits, or having been known for substantial contributions to the site, may also be noted on a memorial page. These memorial pages are specific to each language's version of Wikipedia.

=== YouTube ===
YouTube grants access to accounts of deceased persons under certain conditions. It is one of the data options that one can select to give access to a trusted contact with Google's Inactive Account Manager.

=== Instagram ===
==== Policies ====
As of the COVID-19 pandemic, Instagram has notified its users of a delay in time of reviewing reports of deceased users due to the limited staff the pandemic has caused. Users that submit a report on a deceased user on Instagram can either memorialize the account or remove it from Instagram's platform. Through memorializing the account, Instagram secures and protects a platform of a deceased user, but per their policy, they do not supply any of the login credentials to the account. For both memorializing or removing a deceased users account, a verified user needs to submit a tangible document that shows proof of death of the user. However, to fully remove an account, the user must be a close or direct family member to the deceased person, and show proof of credibility as well.

=== Microsoft ===
==== Policies ====
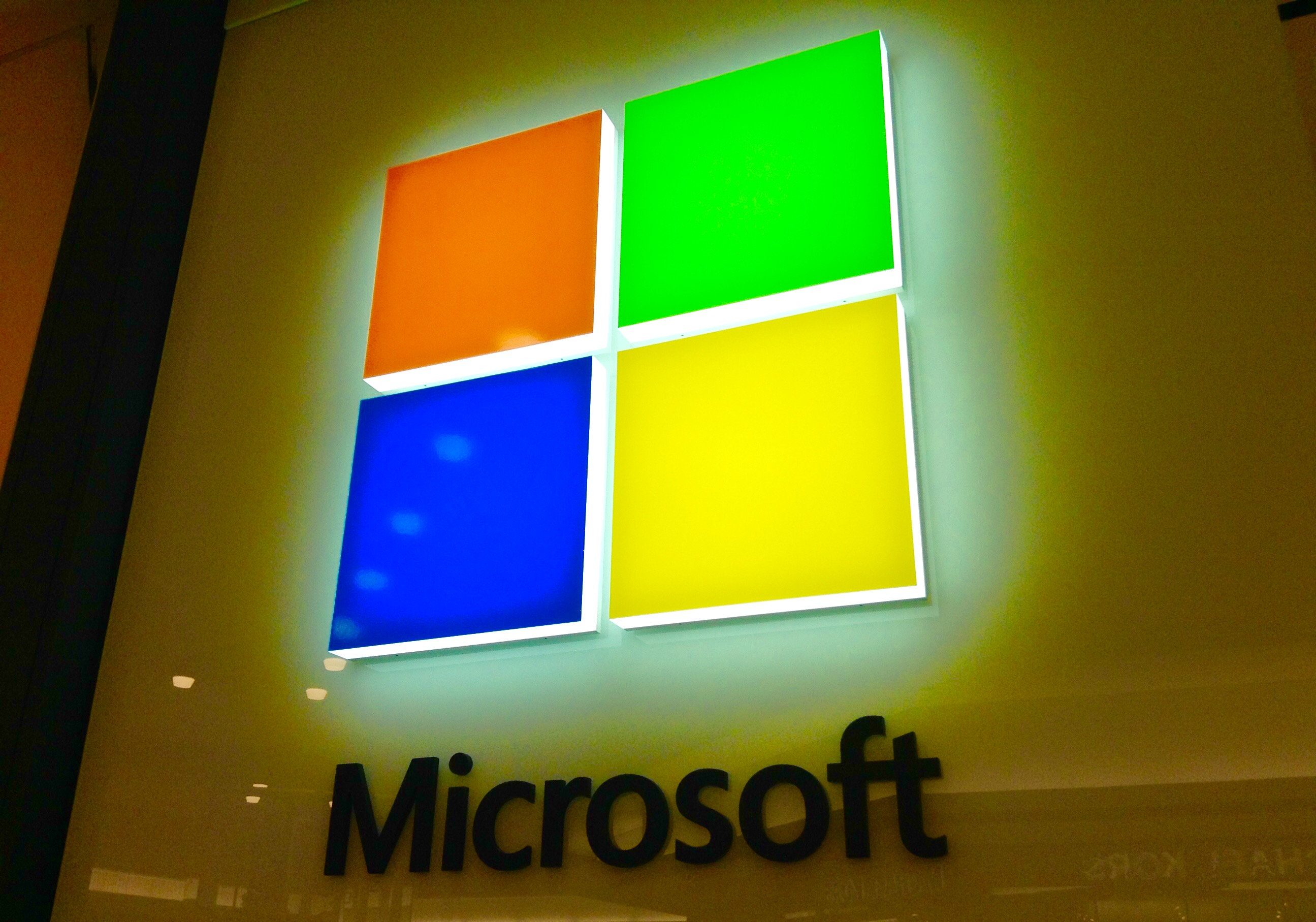
Microsoft has several policies in place when dealing with a deceased user's account.

Per Microsoft's policies, they do not supply any of the login credentials to a deceased user's Microsoft account. A user does not have to contact or notify Microsoft of the deceased user, as the related user is able to close the account themselves. At default, Microsoft removes accounts after 2 years of inactivity. If the user does not have access to the deceased user's account, Microsoft recommends that the user deletes all bank accounts linked to that of the deceased to ensure no subscriptions are still going through. If the user wants to request to gain access to the deceased user's account, a court order or a subpoena has to be provided to Microsoft, but does not guarantee access to the deceased user's account.

For users that live in Germany, more documentation is needed to gain access of a deceased user's account, including the deceased user's death certificate, a form of ID, and a documentation of consent from the deceased. The requesting user needs to provide a form of ID as well.

== Digital inheritance ==
Digital inheritance is the process of handing over personal digital assets to human beneficiaries. These digital assets include digital estates and the right to use them. It may include bank accounts, writings, photographs, and social interactions.

There are several services which store account passwords and send them to selected individuals after death. Some of these periodically send the customer an email to confirm that that person is still alive; after failure to respond to multiple emails, the service provider assumes that the person has died and will thereafter distribute the passwords as arranged. The Data Inheritance function from SecureSafe gives an "activator code" that the customer transfers to a trusted individual, and in the event of death that individual enters the code into Secure Safe's system to get access to the deceased person's digital inheritance. Legacy Locker and SafeBeyond require two persons to confirm the death, together with the presentation of a death certificate, before any passwords are distributed.

Aimed at those concerned with their online privacy, platforms like LifeBank store a customer's Internet account passwords offline while ensuring that a trusted person is given permission to access the stored passwords upon the customer's death.

In July 2018, the Michigan Court of Appeals found that an Evernote document the decedent had typed into his phone shortly before committing suicide was enforceable as valid will.

== See also ==
- Death tech
- Digital immortality
- Digital preservation
- Legacy.com
- Online identity
- Thanatosensitivity
