= Patrick Stokes (philosopher) =

Australian philosopher

- Born: 1978 (age 47–48)
- Awards: Australasian Association of Philosophy Media Prize

Education
- Education: University of Melbourne

Philosophical work
- Era: Contemporary philosophy
- Region: Western philosophy
- School: Continental
- Institutions: University of Hertfordshire; Deakin University
- Main interests: Personal identity Philosophy of religion

Patrick Stokes (born 1978) is an Australian philosopher, Associate Professor in Philosophy at Deakin University and a former Research Fellow in Philosophy at the University of Hertfordshire. He is a winner of Australasian Association of Philosophy Media Prize and is known for his research on Kierkegaard's philosophy.

== Bibliography ==
- The Naked Self: Kierkegaard and Personal Identity, Oxford University Press, 2015
- Kierkegaard's Mirrors, Palgrave, 2010
- Narrative, Identity, and the Kierkegaardian Self, Edinburgh University Press, 2015 (co-editor with John Lippitt)
- Kierkegaard and Death, Indiana University Press, 2011 (co-editor with Adam Buben)
