= On Exactitude in Science =

1946 short story by Jorge Luis Borges

"On Exactitude in Science", or "On Rigor in Science" (Spanish: "Del rigor en la ciencia"), is a one-paragraph short story by Argentine writer Jorge Luis Borges.

== Plot ==
The story, credited fictionally as a quotation from "Suárez Miranda, Viajes de varones prudentes, Libro IV, Cap. XLV, Lérida, 1658", ("Journeys of Prudent Men") describes an empire where cartography becomes so exact that only a map on the same scale as the empire itself will suffice. Later generations come to disregard the map, however, and as it decays, so does the land and society beneath it.

== Publication history ==
The story was first published in the March 1946 edition of Los Anales de Buenos Aires as part of a piece called "Museo" credited to "B. Lynch Davis", a joint pseudonym of Borges and Adolfo Bioy Casares. It was collected later that year in the 1946 second Argentinian edition of Borges's Historia universal de la infamia (A Universal History of Infamy).

The story is no longer included in current Spanish editions of the Historia universal de la infamia, as since 1961 it has appeared as part of Borges's collection El hacedor.

The names "B. Lynch Davis" and "Suárez Miranda" would be combined later in 1946 to form another pseudonym, B. Suárez Lynch, under which Borges and Bioy Casares published Un modelo para la muerte, a collection of detective fiction.

== Influences and legacy ==
"On Exactitude in Science" elaborates on a concept in Lewis Carroll's Sylvie and Bruno Concluded: a fictional map that had "the scale of a mile to the mile." One of Carroll's characters notes some practical difficulties with this map and states that "we now use the country itself, as its own map, and I assure you it does nearly as well."

"What a useful thing a pocket-map is!" I remarked.

"That's another thing we've learned from your Nation," said Mein Herr, "map-making. But we've carried it much further than you. What do you consider the largest map that would be really useful?"

"About six inches to the mile."

"Only six inches!" exclaimed Mein Herr. "We very soon got to six yards to the mile. Then we tried a hundred yards to the mile. And then came the grandest idea of all! We actually made a map of the country, on the scale of a mile to the mile!"

"Have you used it much?" I enquired.

"It has never been spread out, yet," said Mein Herr: "the farmers objected: they said it would cover the whole country, and shut out the sunlight! So we now use the country itself, as its own map, and I assure you it does nearly as well."

— from Lewis Carroll, Sylvie and Bruno Concluded, Chapter XI, London, 1893

Italian writer Umberto Eco expanded upon the theme, quoting the story as the epigraph for his short story "On the Impossibility of Drawing a Map of the Empire on a Scale of 1 to 1", collected in his How to Travel with a Salmon and Other Essays.

French philosopher Jean Baudrillard cited "On Exactitude in Science" as a predecessor to his concept of hyperreality in his 1981 treatise Simulacra and Simulation.

James C. Scott's book Seeing Like a State includes an epigraph quoting "On Exactitude in Science" but attributing the quote to the fictional writer Suárez Miranda rather than to Borges.

== See also ==
- Cartographic generalization
- Map–territory relation
- Welcome to the Desert of the Real
