= Hypersociability =

Method of media consumption

In transmedia storytelling, hypersociability is the encouraged involvement of media consumers in a story through ordinary social interaction. A story may be shared through discourse within a fan group. Hypersociability lessens the need for a publisher to offer fixed media. Instead, storytellers hope that fans will build on the story themselves either over the Internet or through direct conversation. The principle of hypersociability is most widely used in Japanese pop culture, examples of which include Yu-Gi-Oh! and Pokémon, which used multiplayer games separate from the original media. The Wachowskis deliberately incorporated elements of hypersociability for The Animatrix by seeking the help of Japanese animators.
