= Hossein Rahnama =

Canadian computer scientist

- Education: Ryerson University (BC S, MS, PhD)
- Occupations: Founder and CEO of Flybits, Co-Founder and Director of Research and Innovation at Ryerson University Digital Media Zone, Assistant Professor at the RTA School of Media, Director of Research at Ryerson Centre for Cloud and Context-Aware Computing (RC4)

Hossein Rahnama is a Canadian computer scientist, specialising in ubiquitous and pervasive computing. His research explores artificial intelligence, mobile human-computer interaction, and the effective design of contextual services. In 2017, Rahnama was included in Caldwell Partners' list of "Canada’s Top 40 Under 40". In 2012, he was recognized by the MIT Technology Review as one of the world’s top innovators under the age of 35 for his research in context-aware computing. The Smithsonian named Rahnama as one of the top six innovators to watch in 2013. Rahnama has 30 publications and 10 patents in ubiquitous computing, serves on the board of Canadian Science Publishing, and was a Council Member of the National Sciences and Engineering Research Council (NSERC). Rahnama is also a visiting scholar at the Human Dynamics group at MIT Media Lab in Cambridge, MA. He has a PhD in Computer Science from Ryerson University (now Toronto Metropolitan University). Rahnama is an associate professor in Toronto Metropolitan University's RTA School of Media and Director of Research & Innovation at the university's Digital Media Zone.

Rahnama is the founder and CEO of Flybits, "a context-as-a-service company that enables enterprises to unify disparate sources of data and create highly personalized customer experiences." Rahnama is also an assistant professor at the RTA School of Media, and the Co-Founder/Director of Research at the Ryerson Centre for Cloud and Context Aware Computing (RC4) in Toronto, Canada.

== Education ==
In 2004, Rahnama completed his undergraduate degree in Computer Science at Ryerson University. He continued to attend Ryerson for his doctoral degree and postdoctoral work in Electrical and Computer Engineering. During his studies, Rahnama received a number of academic awards and grants for his research, including being a semi-finalist for the business plan competition at Harvard Business School for his innovative research on Flybits in 2008.

== Career ==
As an undergraduate student at Ryerson University, Rahnama began his career at Rogers Communications as a wireless applications developer in 2000 under the supervision of Brad Fortner. In 2003, he worked at Alpha Global Labs as a software and knowledge engineer, working on medical expert systems and the applicability of mobile devices in medical settings.

Prior to his doctoral studies at Ryerson, Rahnama was a mobile applications architect at Primus Telecommunications in London, England. From 2007 to 2010, Rahnama served as the Vice President of Research and Innovation at Appear Networks located in Kista, Sweden, where he participated in a successful European Research Project (MUSIC). In 2009, Rahnama completed his doctoral studies at Ryerson and in 2010, he co-founded the Ryerson Digital Media Zone, which in 2015 became the number #1 university business incubator in North America and #3 in the world by the Swedish UBI Index. Under Rahnama's direction, The DMZ has helped fuel, grow and graduate over 287 startups. They’ve raised $306 million in seed funding and have fostered the creation of more than 2,900 jobs.

In 2013, Rahnama initialized the opening of the Ryerson Centre for Cloud and Context-Aware Computing, where he acts as Director of Research. Inspired by his PhD work on contextual awareness and ubiquitous computing, Rahnama founded Flybits that same year. As stated on the Flybits website, "the context-as-a-service product simplifies how data is converted into intelligence. Flybits enables enterprises to harness all sources of data — proprietary, public, from device sensors and real time user behavior — to deliver personalized mobile experiences." In November 2015 Deloitte named Flybits a "Company to Watch", and in June 2016 Gartner Group selected the company as one of four "Cool Vendors" in the platform-as-a-service category. Flybits has offices in Toronto, the San Francisco Bay Area, and London, UK.

Rahnama promotes experiential learning and is interested in involving undergraduate students in research and innovation projects from early stages of their careers. Rahnama is also an advocate for the Canadian-European research collaborations in the information and communications technology (ICT) sector, where he has collaborated with more than 14 industry partners across Europe, including companies in Sweden and Norway.

== Awards and recognition ==
- Canada’s Top 40 Under 40 2017
- MIT Technology Review TR35 2012
- ORION Innovation Award 2011
- Isadore Sharp Award for Outstanding Recent Graduate 2011
- Selected as Ryerson University's Top 30 Under 30, 2009
- Selected by Royal Canadian Institute as one of Canada's 25 most influential scientists for 2009
- Ontario Centres of Excellence International Scholarship 2008
- Semi Finalist for Harvard Business School's 2008 Business Plan Competition
- Apple Computers student scholarship at WWDC 2007, 2008
- Ryerson NSERC Innovation Challenge Award 2007
- Best Research Seminar Award – Department of Electrical Engineering, Ryerson University 2007
- Nomination for Canada’s 2006 Governor General Gold Medal Award

== Membership in professional societies ==
- Distinguished Member, American Society for AI (ASFAI) (2025–Present)
- Board Member, Canadian Science Publishing (CSP) (2016–Present)
- Council Member, Council Member at the National Science and Engineering Research Council (NSERC) (2013-2016)
- Regular Speaker, International Think Tank
- Member, Institute of Electrical and Electronics Engineers
- Member, IEEE Magnetics Society
- Member, Association for Computing Machinery
- Member, Special Interest Group for Mobile and Ubiquitous Computing
- Member and Advisor, European Consortium in Intelligent Transport Systems
- Member, Canadian Consortium in Intelligent Transport Systems
- Ambassador, Privacy by Design
- Member, Canadian Innovation Exchange
