= Legacy.com =

Commercial provider of online memorials

Legacy Inc.
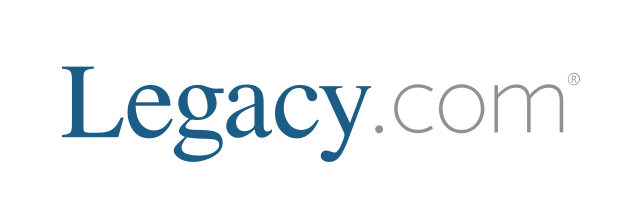
- Company type: Private
- Available in: primarily English
- Founded: 1998; 28 years ago
- Headquarters: Chicago, Illinois, U.S.
- Area served: Worldwide
- Owners: Legacy.com, Inc.
- Founder: Stopher Bartol
- CEO: Curtis Funk
- Industry: Internet industry Media
- Website: legacy.com
- Advertising: Banner ads, promoted links
- Current status: Active

Legacy.com is a United States-based website founded in 1998, the world's largest commercial provider of online memorials. The Web site hosts obituaries and memorials for more than 70 percent of all U.S. deaths. Legacy.com hosts obituaries for more than three-quarters of the 100 largest newspapers in the U.S., by circulation. The site attracts more than 30 million unique visitors per month and is among the top 40 trafficked websites in the world.

== Revenue ==
Legacy, along with the smaller Column.us and its subsidiary Modulist.news, provide significant income to newspapers for obituaries which survivors write and pay newspapers to print, over $50 million from late 2022 to early 2024. Overall US newspapers earn $500 million per year from paid obituaries.

== Affiliations ==
Legacy.com is a privately held company based in Chicago, Illinois, with more than 1,500 newspaper affiliates in North America, Europe and Australia, including The New York Times, The Boston Globe, Washington Post, Chicago Tribune, Los Angeles Times and Manchester Evening News. The executive team was previously led by Stopher Bartol, and is now led by CEO Curtis Funk as of 2024.

== Guestbook ==
Legacy.com attaches a publicly accessible guestbook to most of the obituaries it hosts, which enables anyone with an Internet connection to pay tribute to someone whose obituary appears in one of Legacy.com's affiliate newspapers or is self-published on Legacy.com. The company reviews more than 1,000,000 guestbook entries each month to make sure that entries are appropriate and sensitive to those close to the family. About 75 percent of all guestbooks receive entries. As of 2016, the company was approaching 100 million guestbook entries on its site.
