= Digital asset =

Entity in computerized format

A digital asset is anything that exists only in digital form and comes with a distinct usage right or distinct permission for use. Data that do not possess those rights are not considered assets.

Digital assets include digital documents, audio content, motion pictures, and other relevant digital data currently in circulation or stored on digital appliances, such as personal computers, laptops, portable media players, tablets, data storage devices, and telecommunication devices.

== Types ==
Types of digital assets include, but are not limited to: software, photography, logos, illustrations, animations, audiovisual media, presentations, spreadsheets, digital paintings, electronic documents, electronic mail, websites, and various other digital formats with their respective metadata.

In Intel's presentation at the Intel Developer Forum 2013, they introduced several new types of digital assets related to medicine, education, voting, friendships, conversations, and reputation, among others.

== Digital asset management system ==
A digital asset management (DAM) system is an integrated structure that combines software, hardware, and/or other services to manage, store, ingest, organize, and retrieve digital assets. These systems enable users to find and use content when needed.

== Digital asset metadata ==
Metadata is data about other data. Any structured information that defines a specification of any form of data is referred to as metadata. Metadata is also a claimed relationship between two entities, often used to establish connections or associations.

Librarian Lorcan Dempsey says "Think of metadata as data which removes from a user (human or machine) the need to have full advance knowledge of the existence or characteristics of things of potential interest in the environment".

At first, the term metadata was used for digital data exclusively, but nowadays metadata can apply to both physical and digital data.

Catalogs, inventories, registers, and other similar standardized forms of organizing, managing, and retrieving resources contain metadata.

Metadata can be stored and contained directly within the file it refers to or independently from it with the help of other forms of data management such as a DAM system.

The more metadata is assigned to an asset the easier it gets to categorize it, especially as the amount of information grows. The asset's value rises the more metadata it has for it becomes more accessible, easier to manage, and more complex.

Structured metadata can be shared with open protocols like OAI-PMH to allow further aggregation and processing. Open data sources like institutional repositories have thus been aggregated to form large datasets and academic search engines comprising tens of millions of open access works, like BASE, CORE, and Unpaywall.

== Issues ==
Due to a lack of either legislation or legal precedent, there is limited existing governmental control and regulation surrounding digital assets in the United States and other large economies globally.

Many of the control issues relating to access and transferability are maintained by individual companies. Some consequences of this include 'What is to become of the assets once their owner is deceased?' as well as can, and, if so, how, may they be inherited.

This subject was broached in a fake news story about Bruce Willis allegedly looking to sue Apple as the end user agreement prevented him from bequeathing his iTunes collection to his children.

Another case of this was when a soldier died on duty and the family requested access to the Yahoo! account. When Yahoo! refused to grant access, the probate judge ordered them to give the emails to the family but Yahoo! still was not required to give access.

The Music Modernization Act was passed in September 2018 by the U.S. Congress to create a new music licensing system, with the aim to help songwriters get paid more.

== See also ==
- Digital currency
- Digital goods
- Digital inheritance
- Digital preservation
- Digital rights management
