= Thanatosensitivity =

Approach to research that seeks to incorporate death into design

Thanatosensitivity describes an epistemological-methodological approach to technological research and design that actively seeks to integrate the facts of mortality, dying, and death into traditional user-centered design. Thanatosensitivity was coined by Michael Massimi and Andrea Charise from the University of Toronto in a joint paper presented at CHI 2009, referring to a humanistically grounded approach to human–computer interaction (HCI) research and design that recognizes and engages with the conceptual and practical issues surrounding death in the creation of interactive systems.

The term thanatosensitive is derived from the ancient Greek mythological personification of death, Thanatos (Greek: Θάνατος (Thánatos), "Death"), which is itself a term associated with the notion of the death drive common to 20th-century post-Freudian thought. This inter- or multi-disciplinarity is crucial to thanatosensitive investigation because, unlike many areas of HCI research, studies of death and mortality are rarely amenable to laboratory study or traditional fieldwork approaches. As Massimi and Charise argue, the critical humanist aspect of thanatosensitivity effectively offers "a non-invasive strategy for better understanding the conceptual and practical issues surrounding death, computing, and human experience".

== Conceptual and practical applications ==
Historically, design and research in the computer sciences has rarely considered the issues pursuant to the death of the user. However, Lindley et al. note, "[s]hifts in the field of HCI (Human-Computer Interaction) coupled with the growing maturity of interactive technologies is leading researchers and designers to consider issues relating to mortality." The proliferation of digitally mediated (and often password-protected) personal data and online identities, as well as biometrical practices, "routinely assume a living body for access", which makes access to data following death increasingly problematic for individuals and relatives, as well as institutions and corporations, that may have claims to or stakes in such materials. A 2004 news story describes how Yahoo! denied the family of Justin Ellsworth, a deceased US marine, access to his email, preventing them from accessing information necessary for handling the aftermath of the account owner's death. Determining how digital information and artefacts "can be bequeathed, inherited, and appropriately repurposed" while accounting for the complexity of privacy concerns presents a new horizon of human-computer interaction research. "At a fundamental level, such issues are becoming increasingly prominent as technology companies decide how to handle email accounts or webpages belonging to people who are now deceased." Recent scholarship in this area has called for the development of more purposive applications for facilitating the inheritance of digital materials.

Moreover, the ways in which people use technology in practices concerning mortality, dying, and death are areas of HCI research that have historically received little attention. Although technological artefacts that address issues of the end of life are increasingly common (e.g. online memorials), academic research in this area is at an early stage. Such "thanatechnologies" seek to meet numerous needs, including memorialisation, bereavement support and communication, archiving, access to information and resources, and so on. While many thanatechnologies exist, relatively few are the product of a thanatosensitive design process; rather, they are appropriations of general purpose technologies. For example, forum management software is not explicitly concerned with the mortality of its users; however, online forums are a common place for the bereaved to communicate regarding loss in the form of formal and (more commonly) informal online memorials. Additionally, 3D virtual worlds are beginning to be explored as spaces for informal memorialization.
