= Online memorial =

Website commemorating a death

An online memorial is a virtual space created on the Internet for the purpose of remembering, celebrating, or commemorating those who have died. An online memorial may be a one-page HTML webpage document giving the name of the deceased and a few words of tribute, an extensive information source, or be part of a social media platform where users can add their own words and photos.

An example of an online memorial is The COVID Memorial, which is a global memorial to commemorate all those who have lost their lives due to COVID-19.

== History ==
A few individual online memorials started appearing on the Internet in the late 1990s. Many were websites created in response to the death of a person who was in the public eye, rather than for general members of the public. Popular memorial sites include one example of this is the collective memorial website Find a Grave, which at that time was focused on publishing memorial information about famous people. Also during the 1990s, newspapers and funeral homes began contributing obituaries to permanent online databases. Online cemeteries, the first of which was launched in 1995 as the World Wide Cemetery (cemetery.org), also host online memorials.

In 1997, Carla Sofka, professor of social work, recognized the increasing use of this new form of memorialisation. Online memorials for public events, such as the one created by the National September 11 Memorial and Museum, also began to appear, allowing a collective response to events causing widespread grief.

In the 2000s, with the development of social media platforms and simplified website creation software, the numbers of individual online memorials increased rapidly. There was another acceleration following the Covid-19 pandemic.

== Benefits of online memorials ==
Online memorials allow participation in the grieving process from a distance and at any time of the day or night; in the view of some sociologists, such public displays of grief are important for emotional recovery after bereavement. They provide a communications outlet for continued grieving when more formal events have ended. Availability of inexpensive or free online space allows grievers to include extensive content such as stories and discussions. Unlike some other types of memorials, they have little environmental impact. Facebook can give people the opportunity to keep the deceased a part of their lives by posting on their walls during the holidays, birthdays, and other important dates in their lives or the bereaved’s life. Online memorials also give the bereaved the ability to pull up the deceased person’s page and read through the comments or pictures when they are having a particularly difficult time and want to remember good memories they once shared with the deceased. Continuing bonds and expressing feelings toward the deceased can be considered therapeutic to the bereaved.

Recent research also highlights the role of online memorials in fostering a sense of community among the bereaved, where this collective grieving process can promote social support and resilience following loss.

== Memorial pages on social media ==
Many online memorial platforms, as well as individual memorials created on general social media sites and blogs, allow memorials to be built in a collaborative fashion by mourners, who share their expressions of grief in the form of comments or posts.

Social media pages created by people who have later died are sometimes converted into memorial sites. Facebook, for example, provides a process for transforming the profile of a deceased user into a memorial. Family members or friends can report an account to be memorialized upon presentation of proof of death. When the account is memorialized, Facebook removes sensitive information such as contact information and status updates, but still enables friends and family to leave posts on the profile wall in remembrance. However, only confirmed friends can see the memorialized profile or locate it in search.

== Fundraising in memory ==
Online memorials are sometimes used to collect in memoriam donations to charitable or non-profit organizations, to fund medical research, hospices, or community activities and hobbies in which the deceased participated.

== See also ==
- Virtual funeral
- Griefbot
