= Simulacrum =

Representation or imitation of a person or thing

Image of a real apple (left) and plastic food-model apple. The fake apple is a simulacrum.

A simulacrum (pl.: simulacra or simulacrums, from Latin simulacrum, meaning likeness or semblance) is a representation or imitation of a person or thing. The word was first recorded in the English language in the late 16th century, used to describe a representation, such as a statue or a painting, especially of a god.

By the late 19th century, it had gathered a secondary association of inferiority: an image without the substance or qualities of the original. Literary critic Fredric Jameson offers photorealism as an example of artistic simulacrum, in which a painting is created by copying a photograph that is itself a copy of the real thing.

Other art forms that play with simulacra include trompe-l'œil, pop art, Italian neorealism, and French New Wave.

== Original philosophy ==
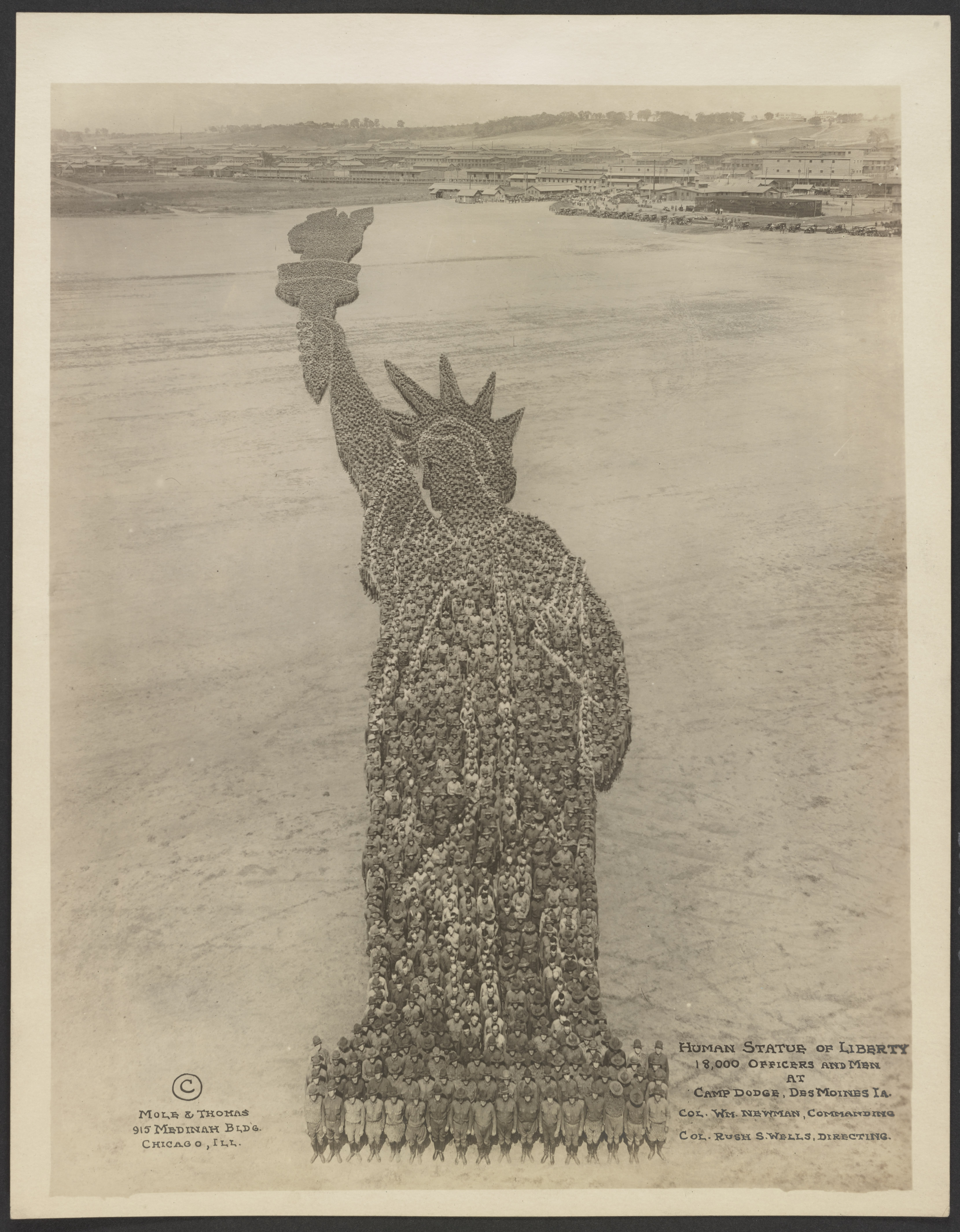
Mole & Thomas, Human Statue of Liberty (1919)—an anamorphic optical illusion, with 12,000 people in the flame of the torch and 6,000 in the rest of the shape. Plato was referring to an illusion such as this in his discussion of simulacra.

Simulacra have long been of interest to philosophers. In his Sophist, Plato speaks of two kinds of image-making. The first is a faithful reproduction, attempted to copy precisely the original. The second is intentionally distorted in order to make the copy appear correct to viewers. He gives the example of Greek statuary, which was crafted larger on the top than on the bottom so that viewers on the ground would see it correctly. If the viewers could see it in scale, they would realize it was malformed. This example from the visual arts serves as a metaphor for the philosophical arts and the tendency of some philosophers to distort the truth so that it appears accurate unless viewed from the proper angle. Nietzsche addresses the concept of simulacrum (but does not use the term) in the Twilight of the Idols, suggesting that most philosophers, by ignoring the reliable input of their senses and resorting to the constructs of language and reason, arrive at a distorted copy of reality.

French semiotician and social theorist Jean Baudrillard argues in Simulacra and Simulation that a simulacrum is not a copy of the real, but becomes truth in its own right: the hyperreal. According to Baudrillard, what the simulacrum copies either had no original or no longer has an original, since a simulacrum signifies something it is not, and therefore leaves the original unable to be located. Where Plato saw two types of representation—faithful and intentionally distorted (simulacrum)—Baudrillard identifies four stages of the sign, often referred to as the orders of simulacra: (1) the First Order, a basic reflection of reality; (2) the Second Order, a perversion of reality; (3) the Third Order, a precedence of reality where the simulation (the map) precedes the original (the territory); and (4) the Fourth Order, a pure simulacrum which 'bears no relation to any reality whatsoever'.

In Baudrillard's concept, like Nietzsche's, simulacra are perceived as negative, but another modern philosopher who addressed the topic, Gilles Deleuze, takes a different view, seeing simulacra as the avenue by which an accepted ideal or "privileged position" could be "challenged and overturned". Deleuze defines simulacra as "those systems in which different relates to different by means of difference itself. What is essential is that we find in these systems no prior identity, no internal resemblance".

Alain Badiou, in speaking with reference to Nazism about Evil, writes, "fidelity to a simulacrum, unlike fidelity to an event, regulates its break with the situation not by the universality of the void, but by the closed particularity of an abstract set ... (the 'Germans' or the 'Aryans')".

According to the philosopher Florent Schoumacher, in societies of hypermodernity, in the West, the social contract states that we are obliged to use "simulacra". We are carried there by hubris. However, the contemporary notion of simulacrum assumes that we all have a biased relationship with the reality of the world, not because reality is not accessible, but because we wish not to see things as they appear. The philosopher nevertheless emphasizes that our capacity for aphairesis, our capacity for representing the world, does indeed exist.

== Recreation ==
Recreational simulacra include reenactments of historical events or replicas of landmarks, such as Colonial Williamsburg and the Eiffel Tower, and constructions of fictional or cultural ideas, such as Fantasyland at The Walt Disney Company's Magic Kingdom. The various Disney parks have been regarded as the ultimate recreational simulacra by some philosophers, with Baudrillard noting that Walt Disney World Resort is a copy of a copy, or "a simulacrum to the second power". In 1975, Italian author Umberto Eco argued that at Disney's parks, "we not only enjoy a perfect imitation, we also enjoy the conviction that imitation has reached its apex and afterwards reality will always be inferior to it". Examining the impact of Disney's simulacrum of national parks, Disney's Wilderness Lodge, environmentalist Jennifer Cypher and anthropologist Eric Higgs expressed worry that "the boundary between artificiality and reality will become so thin that the artificial will become the centre of moral value". Eco also refers to commentary on watching sports as sports to the power of three, or sports cubed. First, there are the players who participate in the sport (the real), then the onlookers merely witnessing it, and finally the commentary on the act of witnessing the sport.

== Iconography ==
Beer (1999: p. 11) employs the term "simulacrum" to denote the formation of a sign or iconographic image, whether iconic or aniconic, in the landscape or greater field of Thangka art and Tantric Buddhist iconography. For example, an iconographic representation of a cloud formation sheltering a deity in a thangka or covering the auspice of a sacred mountain in the natural environment may be discerned as a simulacrum of an "auspicious canopy" (Sanskrit: Chhatra) of the Ashtamangala. Perceptions of religious imagery in natural phenomena approach a cultural universal and may be proffered as evidence of the natural creative spiritual engagement of the experienced environment endemic to the human psychology.

== As artificial beings ==
Simulacra often appear in speculative fiction. Examples of simulacra in the sense of artificial or supernaturally or scientifically created artificial life forms include:

- Automaton – A self-operating robot.
- Androids created to pass for human beings in several of Philip K. Dick's novels are called "simulacra" in We Can Build You, The Simulacra, Now Wait for Last Year, Clans of the Alphane Moon, The Penultimate Truth and Do Androids Dream of Electric Sheep? (called "replicants" in its film adaptation Blade Runner).
- Avatar (computing) – A graphical representation of a user.
- Experience machine - A thought experiment put forward by Robert Nozick in his book Anarchy, State, and Utopia, in which any desirable experience can be simulated.
- Evil Deadpool - A Marvel Comics character created by Deadpool's preserved lost body parts being fused and brought to life by their remaining healing factor.
- Feathertop – A scarecrow created and brought to life by a witch.
- Frankenstein's Monster from Frankenstein – A creation of Victor Frankenstein made from various body parts. Frankenstein's Monster was also adapted in DC Comics and Marvel Comics.
  - The Universal Pictures film Bride of Frankenstein featured the titular monster that was made by a collaboration of Henry Frankenstein and Doctor Septimus Pretorius. She even had comic book counterpart from DC Comics.
  - DC Comics also had another Frankenstein's monster-like character called Young Frankenstein.
- Galatea from Metamorphoses – A statue of a female created by Pygmalion and brought to life by Aphrodite.
- Gargoyles – Statues sculpted to resemble monsters.
- Ham Monster - A monster from The Mr. Potato Head Show who Dr. Fruitcake created from meat and crab claws.
- Hatsune Miku and other Vocaloids.
- Holograms – Computerized images of anything.
- Homunculus – Small miniature humanoids created through alchemy.
- Jack Pumpkinhead - Princess Ozma's Tip form created him from a jack-o'-lantern and tree limbs.
- "Maria" the Robotrix from Fritz Lang's Metropolis
- Neutrinos from Solaris – A race of creatures made from the memories of humans.
- Nomu – Creatures from My Hero Academia. Also known as "Artificial Humans", the Nomu are deceased humans who were resurrected and modified to wield multiple powers at once.
- Pinocchio – A puppet that comes to life.
- Pintosmalto – A statue of a man-made from large amounts of sugar and sweet almonds, scented water, musk and amber, various jewels, gold thread, and above all a trough and a silver trowel who was brought to life by a Goddess of Love.
- Realm of the Mad God has several enemies stated to be simulacrums in-universe. Most notably, the incarnation of Oryx the Mad God that the player fights in Oryx's Chamber is explicitly stated by Oryx to not be his real form. In addition, the versions of various bosses fought in the "Mad God Mayhem" dungeon are all stated to be simulacrums, and the version of Dr. Terrible fought in the Mad Lab is stated to be a simulacrum in additional media.
- Robots
- RUR – Originated the word robot.
- Simulacrum Soldier – Robotic soldiers with human minds employed by both the IMC and Frontier Militia in the Titanfall universe. While they bear a superficial resemblance to the commonly-fielded BRD-01 Spectre, Simulacra are instead human minds uploaded into robotic bodies. A simulacrum can be considered a form of transhumanism.
  - Revenant – An example from its spinoff, Apex Legends, a playable Legend who possesses a mind of a former human hitman.
  - Ash - Also an example, present in both Titanfall 2 and Apex Legends.
- Simulacrum Spell – An illusion spell from Dungeons & Dragons that creates a partially real duplicate of someone, though it only has half the power and abilities of the original.
- Snegurochka – A little girl made of snow.
- Squadron Supreme of America - In Marvel Comics, the Squadron Supreme of America are revealed to be simulacrums created by Mephisto and programmed by the Power Elite so that Phil Coulson can have them be a United States-sponsored superhero team.
- Terracotta Army – Terracotta sculptures of the armies of Qin Shi Huang.
- The Gingerbread Man – A gingerbread man that came to life.
  - The character John Dough was also a gingerbread man that came to life.
- The Golem of Jewish folklore – A creation of a rabbi made from clay that was harvested from the banks of the Vltava.
- Thumbelina – A small girl created by a witch.
- Ushabti – Egyptian figurines.
- Vasilisa the Beautiful – A doll that came to life.
- Wirehead (science fiction) - A hypothetical futuristic application of brain stimulation reward where pleasure is artificially induced.

Also, the illusions of absent loved ones created by an alien life form in Stanislaw Lem's Solaris can be considered simulacra.

== Architecture ==
In his book Simulacra and Simulation, Jean Baudrillard describes the Beaubourg effect in which the Pompidou Centre functions as a monument of a mass simulation that absorbs and devours all the cultural energy from its surrounding areas. According to Baudrillard, the Centre Pompidou is "a machine for making emptiness".

An everyday use of the simulacrum are the false facades, used during renovations to hide and imitate the real architecture underneath it.

A Potemkin village is a simulation: a facade meant to fool the viewer into thinking that he or she is seeing the real thing. The concept is used in the Russian-speaking world as well as in English and in other languages. Potemkin village belongs to a genus of phenomena that proliferated in post-Soviet space. Those phenomena describe gaps between external appearances and underlying realities.

Disneyland – Disneyland is a model of many entangled orders of simulacra. [...] It is a "play of illusions and phantasms."

Las Vegas is a imitation of the world's spectacles coupled with distraction, creating an immersive facade. The architecture, with no historical support and the replica pastiche Eiffel Tower at Paris Las Vegas, create a hyperreality that functions as simulacrum.

== Digital and algorithmic simulacrum ==
In the 21st century, the transition from an analog to a digital society has shifted the simulacrum from a theoretical postmodern concept into a functional, structural reality. This evolution is defined by the move from "atoms to bits," where digital copies often hold higher social and economic value than their physical counterparts. This shift has birthed what some scholars term a "Fourth Order" of simulacra—simulations that are not just copies of the real, but are autonomous systems that generate their own reality through algorithmic logic and economic scarcity.

=== Virtual economies and digital scarcity ===
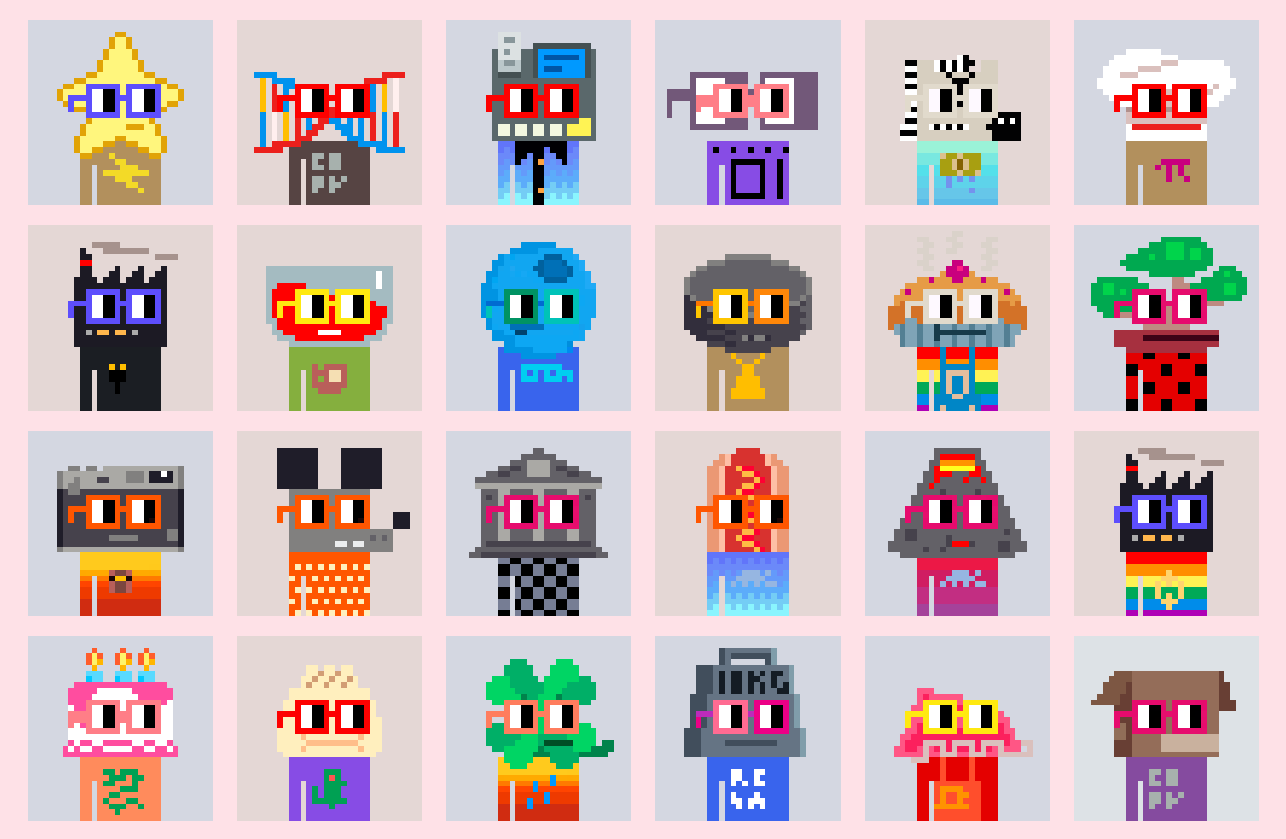
Examples of Nouns artwork. A single noun is composed of five different components (background, body, head, glasses and accessory), each of which is picked from a group of available assets based on Ethereum block hashes.

Baudrillard’s "Third Order of Simulacra" describes a copy without an original. In modern virtual economies, this is realized through digital assets that exist as pure code. Unlike physical goods, digital objects are infinitely replicable by nature; however, through Blockchain technology and Non-Fungible Tokens (NFTs), "artificial scarcity" is enforced, creating a market for the "sign" rather than the utility.

This economic shift represents a fundamental change in the business model of creativity. In a traditional economy, value is tied to the physical rarity of an object. In a digital simulacrum, value is tied to the social validation of the copy. This is evidenced by the rise of virtual real estate in platforms like the Metaverse, where users pay significant sums for digital assets that have no physical existence, yet function as an investment in a weightless economy.

A prominent example is the market for "Skins" (cosmetic outfits) in the video game "Fortnite''. These items provide "no competitive in-game advantage and have no physical form. Their value is derived entirely from their status as a "sign" within a social simulation. This reflects the shift toward a creative economy where the brand and the image are the primary commodities.

The "simulacrum" here is dual-layered: the skin is a simulation of clothing, and the avatar is a simulation of the self. By utilizing a "Rotating Shop" model, Epic Games creates a sense of urgency for a product that costs zero marginal dollars to reproduce. By pricing the simulation, the economy validates the simulacrum as "more real" than physical clothing for a generation that spends its social life in digital spaces. This highlights a transition where the economy does not just support the "real", but rather thrives on the simulation counterpart.

=== Procedural generation ===
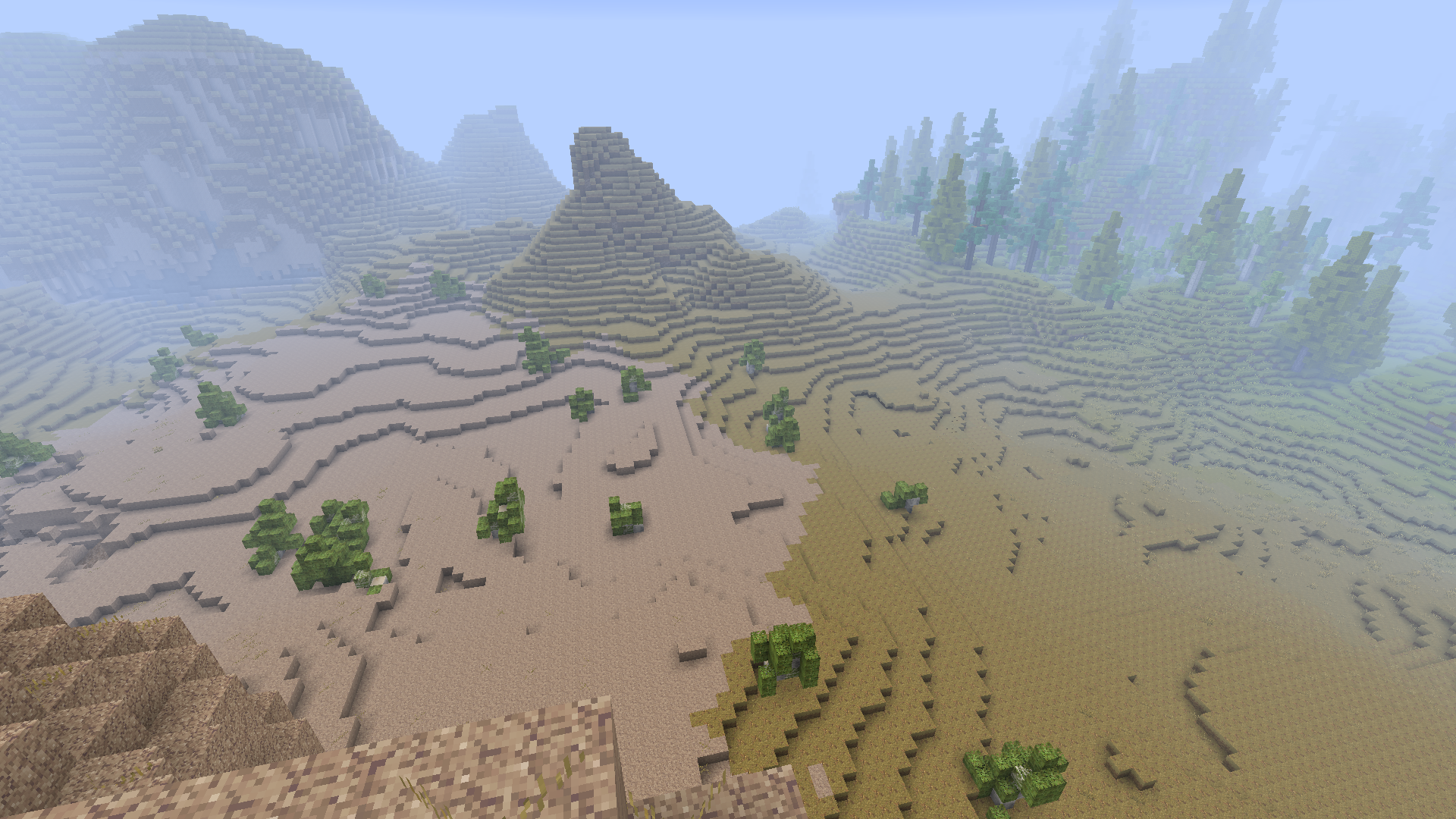
A bird's-eye view of a procedurally generated desert biome in modded Minecraft. The algorithmic "seed" acts as the mathematical map that precedes the existence of the digital territory, illustrating the third-order simulacrum where the simulation generates reality in real-time.

Baudrillard used the metaphor of a map so detailed it covers the entire territory. In video game design, this is achieved via procedural generation. In games like Minecraft or No Man's Sky, mathematical algorithms (the map/code) generate the environment (the territory) as the player explores it.

This process reverses the traditional creative sequence. In the "First Order," an artist imitates a real forest. In the "Third Order," the algorithm generates a forest that has never existed and does not refer to any specific real-world location. The simulation is the reality. This challenges the concept of technological determinism, as the technology is not just a tool but the creative agent itself, producing a simulacrum of nature that satisfies the human need for exploration in a world that is fundamentally synthetic.

This leads to a state of hyperreality where the simulated experience of "discovery" is felt as authentic by the player, despite the "territory" being a temporary calculation of a CPU. In these systems, the simulation is not a representation of a world; it is the production of a world through mathematical signs.

=== Generative AI and the simulacrum of creativity ===
The emergence of generative AI represents the stage where the simulation bears no relation to any physical reality. AI models produce content by analyzing patterns in vast datasets. The resulting output is a "copy of a million copies," a synthesis that lacks a singular human original.

In 2023, the song "Heart on My Sleeve" featuring AI-generated vocals mimicking the artists Drake and The Weeknd, became a viral sensation. The song was a perfect simulacrum: it possessed the stylistic markers and vocal timbre of the artists, yet neither artist was involved.

This case highlights the legal and moral issues related to AI art in the digital age. From a legal standpoint, it challenged intellectual property and the right of publicity. Because the AI did not "sample" an existing recording but rather simulated the "idea" of the artist's voice, it occupied a legal grey area. This reflects a state of Generative Hyperreality, where the simulation of a persona can compete economically and culturally with the real person. The AI Drake is a simulacrum that functions as an "influencer" without a human body, bypassing the traditional gatekeepers of the music industry.

=== Intellectual property and remix culture ===
As the simulacrum becomes the dominant form of cultural production, the legal definition of "Originality" is under siege. Traditional Copyright law is based on the "First Order" of reality—protecting a fixed expression of an idea. In a digital network characterized by Remix culture, where every work is a collage of existing digital signs, the "original" is often impossible to locate.

The legal concepts of Fair use and Creative Commons attempt to bridge this gap. However, as seen in litigations against AI companies, the law struggles with the concept of "Training Data." If an AI "learns" from a human artist's style to create a new simulacrum, the distinction between "influence" and "copy" disappears. The simulacrum is no longer just a philosophical curiosity; it is a battleground for the future of human labor and economic value.

=== "Third culture" and digital ontology ===
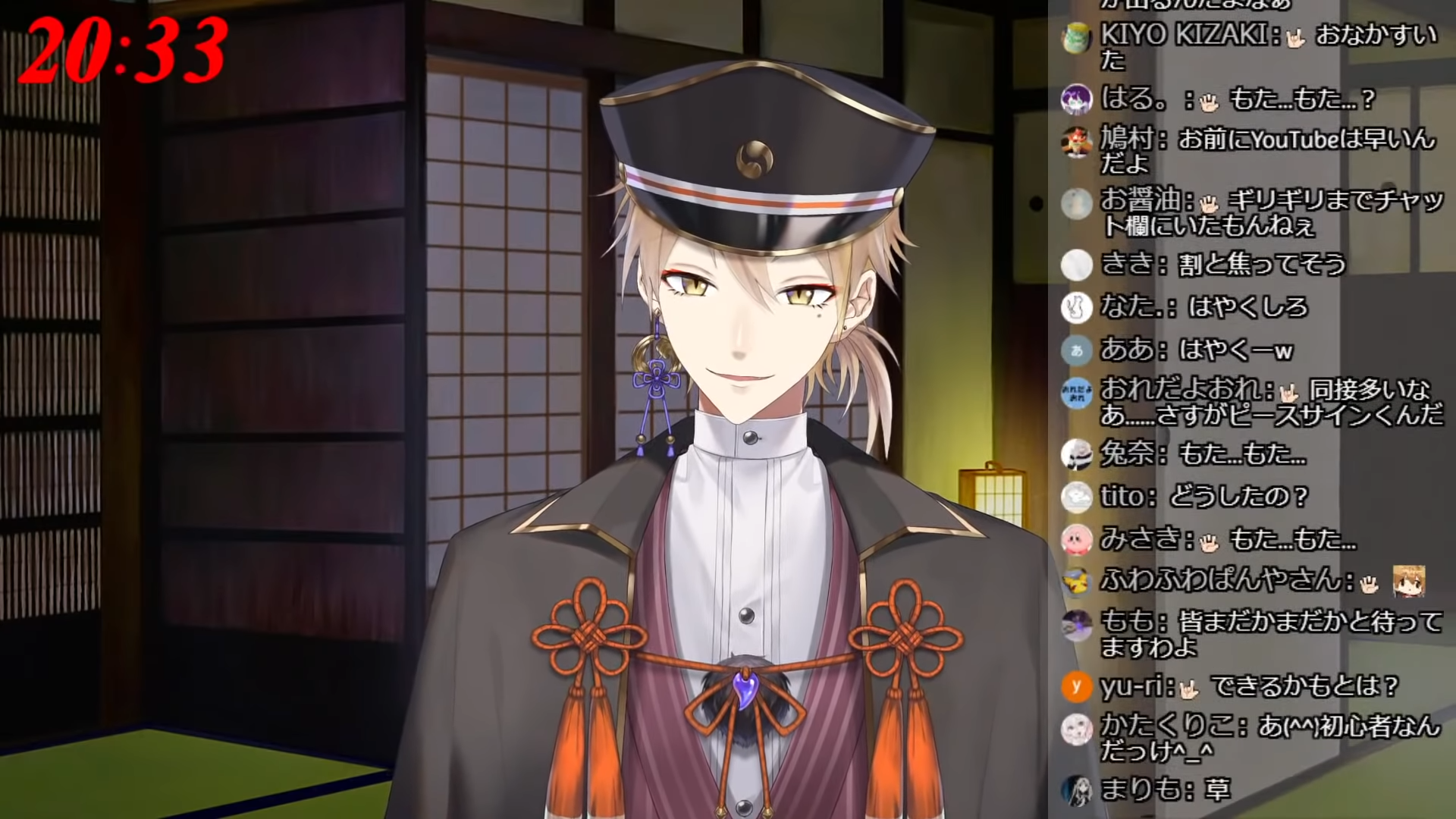
Screenshot of a VTuber stream, with viewers communicating live with the character. The character/performer shown is Fushimi Gaku of Nijisanji.

The concept of the "third culture" describes a space where the traditional divide between the humanities (centered on meaning and art) and the sciences (centered on technology and engineering) converges into a shared ground. In this intersection, the simulacrum serves as a critical bridge; it is no longer just a philosophical metaphor but a technical requirement for digital existence. As engineering creates increasingly complex environments, digital objects are beginning to be treated with the same ontological weight—or "status of being"—as physical ones. This is most evident in the rise of virtual influencers (such as Lil Miquela) and VTubers (virtual YouTubers). These entities are "pure simulacra": they are simulations of human personality and aesthetics that possess no physical "original" in the real world, yet they maintain millions of followers, influence social discourse, and generate significant economic revenue through brand partnerships.

While many VTubers utilize real-time motion capture technology controlled by human performers, they represent a transition into the Fourth Order of simulacra. In this stage, the human original is not 'represented' by the avatar but is often rendered anonymous or secondary to the digital persona. The value of the VTuber lies in the algorithmic resonance of the character and its ability to function as an autonomous brand. Here, the simulation does not merely mask a human original; it provides a digital ontology where the avatar becomes the primary reality for the audience, decoupled from the biological identity of the performer.

Beyond mere representation, the digital simulacrum has evolved into an autonomous agent within the global creative economy. In this "fourth order" of simulation, the value of the digital persona is decoupled from human biology and tied instead to the algorithmic resonance of the brand. This shift reflects a new business model where "creativity" is measured by the ability to sustain a simulation that can compete for market share against human creators. These digital beings occupy a "hyperreal" space where the distinction between the person and the program is irrelevant to their economic function. As these entities begin to utilize generative AI to interact with audiences in real-time, the simulacrum completes its transition from a passive copy to an active participant in human culture. This suggests that in the digital age, the simulation does not just mirror the real—it provides the very infrastructure upon which modern social and economic life is built.

== See also ==
- Memetics
- Simulacra and Simulation
- Simulated reality
- Deadbot
- Metaverse
