= György Lukács bibliography =

György Lukács (13 April 1885 – 4 June 1971) was a Hungarian Marxist philosopher and literary critic.

There follows a bibliography of György Lukács.

== Books by Lukács in English ==
A date in brackets is that of the original publication in Hungarian or German.

- 1950. Studies in European Realism. London: Hillway. (Note: Also published by Merlin, 1972.)
- 1962. [1937, Rus.; 1947, Hun.] The Historical Novel. London: Merlin.
- 1963. [1958, Ger.] The Meaning of Contemporary Realism. London: Merlin. (Note: Also published with different prefaces as Realism in Our Time (New York: Harper and Row, 1964).)
- 1964. [1947, Hun.] Essays on Thomas Mann. London: Merlin.
- 1968. [1947, Ger.] Goethe and His Age. London: Merlin.
- 1970. [1924, Ger.] Lenin: A Study on the Unity of his Thought. London: New Left Books. (Note: Also published in Cambridge, Massachusetts: MIT Press.)
- 1970. [1969, Ger.] Solzhenitsyn. London: Merlin.
- 1970. Writer and Critic, and Other Essays. Edited by Arthur Kahn. London: Merlin.
- 1971. [1923, Ger.] History and Class Consciousness. London: Merlin.
- 1971. [1916/1920, Ger.: Die Theorie des Romans.] The Theory of the Novel. London: Merlin.
- 1972. [1919, Hun.] Tactics and Ethics. Edited by Rodney Livingstone. London: New Left Books.
- 1973. Marxism and Human Liberation. Edited by E. San Juan, Jr. New York: Dell.
- 1974. Conversations with Lukács. Edited by Theo Pinkus. London: Merlin.
- 1974. [1910, Hun.] Soul and Form. London: Merlin.
- 1975. [1948, Ger.] The Young Hegel. London: Merlin.
- 1978. The Ontology of Social Being. 1, Hegel's False and His Genuine Ontology. London: Merlin.
- 1978. The Ontology of Social Being. 2, Marx's Basic Ontological Premises. London: Merlin.
- 1980. [1954, Ger.] The Destruction of Reason. London: Merlin.
- 1980. [1948, Ger.] Essays on Realism. Edited by Rodney Livingstone. London: Lawrence and Wishart.
- 1980. The Ontology of Social Being. 3, Labour. London: Merlin.
- 1983. Record of a Life. Edited by István Eörsi. London: Verso.
- 1983. Reviews and Articles from "Die Rote Fahne". London: Merlin.
- 1986. Selected Correspondence, 1902–1920. Edited by Judith Marcus and Zoltán Tar. New York: Columbia University Press.
- 1991. The Process of Democratization. Albany: State University of New York Press.
- 1993. [1951, Ger.] German Realists in the Nineteenth Century. Edited by Rodney Livingstone. London: Libris.
- 1995. The Lukács Reader. Edited by Arpad Kadarkay. Oxford: Blackwell.
- 2002. [1996, Ger.] A Defence of "History and Class Consciousness." London: Verso.
- 2010. [1910, Hun.] Soul and Form. New ed. Edited by John T. Sanders and Katie Terezakis. New York: Columbia University Press.
- 2012. The Culture of People's Democracy. Edited by Tyrus Miller. Leiden: Brill.

== Selected articles and book chapters by Lukács in English ==
- 1920. "The Social Background of the White Terror." Workers' Dreadnought, November 20: 1.
- 1921. "The Problem of Communist Organization." Communist Review, October: 41–49.
- 1934. "Marx and Engels on Problems of Dramaturgy." International Theatre, no. 2: 11–14.
- 1934. "Propaganda or Partisanship?" Partisan Review 1, no. 2: 36–46.
- 1935. "Nietzsche, Forerunner of Fascist Aesthetics." International Literature, no. 1: 67–80.
- 1936. "Essay on the Novel." International Literature, no. 5: 68–74.
- 1936. "The Intellectual Physiognomy of Literary Characters." International Literature, no. 8: 56–83. (Note: Republished in Lee Baxandall, ed., Radical Perspectives in the Arts (Harmondsworth: Penguin, 1972), 89–141.) (Note: A different translation published in the author's Writer and Critic (1970).)
- 1937. "Narration versus Description." Pt. 1. International Literature, no. 6: 96–112.
- 1937. "Narration versus Description." Pt. 2. International Literature, no. 7: 85–97.
- 1939. "On Socialist Realism." International Literature, no. 4–5: 87–96.
- 1962. "Thomas Mann." New Left Review 16: 76–87.
- 1966. "Technology and Social Relations." New Left Review 39: 27–34.
- 1967. "Lessing's Minna von Barnhelm." International Social Science Journal 19, no. 4: 570–580.
- 1970. "The Old Culture and the New Culture." Telos 5: 21–30.
- 1970. "The Twin Crises." New Left Review 60: 36–47.
- 1971. "Lukács on His Life and Work." New Left Review 68: 49–58.
- 1972. "A Final Rethinking." Social Policy 3, no. 2: 4–8, 56–57.
- 1972. "Labour as a Model of Social Practice." New Hungarian Quarterly 13, no. 47: 5–43.
- 1972. "Max Weber and German Sociology." Economy and Society 1, no. 4: 386–398.
- 1972. "On the Phenomenology of the Creative Process." Philosophical Forum 3, no. 3–4: 314–325.
- 1972. "On the Poverty of Spirit." Philosophical Forum 3, no. 3–4: 371–385.
- 1973. "Approximation to Life in the Novel and the Play." In Sociology of Literature and Drama, edited by Elizabeth Burns and Tom Burns, 280–295. Harmondsworth: Penguin.
- 1975. "Franz Kafka or Thomas Mann?" In Marxists on Literature, edited by David Craig, 380–394. Harmondsworth: Penguin. (Note: Previously published in the author's The Meaning of Contemporary Realism (1963).)
- 1975. "Tolstoy and the Development of Realism." In Marxists on Literature, edited by David Craig, 282–345. Harmondsworth: Penguin. (Note: Previously published in the author's Studies in European Realism (1950).)
- 1975. Hauser, Arnold, and György Lukács. "On Youth, Art and Philosophy: A 1969 Radio Meeting." New Hungarian Quarterly 16, no. 58: 96–105.
- 1977. "Bolshevism as a Moral Problem." Social Research 44, no. 3: 416–424.
- 1977. [1938, Ger.]. "Realism in the Balance." In Aesthetics and Politics, 28–59. London: New Left Books.
- 1977. "An Unpublished Letter by Georg Lukács." Science and Society 41, no. 1: 66–68.
- 1978. "On Bertolt Brecht." New Left Review 110: 88–92.
- 1978. "On Walter Benjamin." New Left Review 110: 83–88.
- 1983. "Gelebtes Denken: An Autobiographical Sketch." New Hungarian Quarterly 24, no. 89: 66–95.
- 1985. "The Present and Future of Democratization." New Hungarian Quarterly 26, no. 97: 100–114.
- 1991. "Georg Simmel." Theory, Culture and Society 8, no. 3: 145–150.
- 1998. "Aesthetic Culture." Yale Journal of Criticism 11, no. 2: 365–379.

== Selected books on Lukács in English ==
=== General and biographical studies ===
- Arato, Andrew, and Paul Breines. The Young Lukács and the Origins of Western Marxism. New York: Seabury, 1979.
- Bahr, Ehrhard, and Ruth Goldschmidt Kunzer. Georg Lukács. Modern Literature Monographs. New York: Frederick Ungar, 1972.
- Bewes, Timothy, and Timothy Hall, eds. Georg Lukács: The Fundamental Dissonance of Existence. London: Continuum, 2011.
- Congdon, Lee. The Young Lukács. Chapel Hill: University of North Carolina Press, 1983.
- Corredor, Eva L., ed. Lukács After Communism: Interviews with Contemporary Intellectuals. Post-Contemporary Interventions. Durham: Duke University Press, 1997.
- Feenberg, Andrew. Lukács, Marx, and the Sources of Critical Theory. Oxford: Martin Robertson, 1981.
- ———. The Philosophy of Praxis: Marx, Lukács, and the Frankfurt School. London: Verso, 2014. (Note: Revised edition of the author's Lukács, Marx, and the Sources of Critical Theory (1981).)
- Fekete, Eva, and Eva Karadi, eds. György Lukács: His Life in Pictures and Documents. Budapest: Corvina, 1981.
- Gluck, Mary. Georg Lukács and His Generation, 1900–1918. Cambridge, Mass.: Harvard University Press, 1985.
- Heller, Ágnes, ed. Lukács Revalued. Oxford: Blackwell, 1983. (Note: Also published as Lukács Reappraised (New York: Columbia University Press, 1983).)
- Illés, László, Farkas József, Miklós Szabolcsi, and István Szerdahelyi, eds. Hungarian Studies on György Lukács. Budapest: Akadémiai Kiadó, 1993.
- Joós, Ernest, ed. George Lukács and His World: A Reassessment. New York: Peter Lang, 1987.
- Kadarkay, Arpad. Georg Lukács: Life, Thought and Politics. Oxford: Blackwell, 1991.
- Lichtheim, George. Lukács. Modern Masters. London: Fontana, 1970. (Note: Also published as Georg Lukács (New York: Viking, 1970).)
- Löwy, Michael. Georg Lukács: From Romanticism to Bolshevism. London: New Left Books, 1979.
- Marcus, Judith, and Zoltán Tar, eds. Georg Lukács: Theory, Culture and Politics. New Brunswick: Transaction, 1989.
- Parkinson, G. H. R. Georg Lukács. London: Routledge and Kegan Paul, 1977.
- ———, ed. Georg Lukács: The Man, His Work and His Ideas. London: Weidenfeld and Nicolson, 1969.
- Rockmore, Tom, ed. Lukács Today: Essays in Marxist Philosophy. Dordrecht: D. Reidel, 1988.
- Sim, Stuart. Georg Lukács. Modern Cultural Theorists. New York: Harvester Wheatsheaf, 1994.
- Thompson, Michael J. Georg Lukács Reconsidered: Critical Essays in Politics, Philosophy and Aesthetics. London: Continuum, 2011.
- Zitta, Victor. Georg Lukács' Marxism: Alienation, Dialectics, Revolution. The Hague: Martin Nijhoff, 1964.

=== Special studies ===
- Aitken, Ian. Lukácsian Film Theory and Cinema: A Study of Georg Lukács' Writings on Film, 1913–71. Manchester: Manchester University Press, 2012.
- Bernstein, J. M. The Philosophy of the Novel: Lukács, Marxism, and the Dialectics of Form. Brighton: Harvester, 1984.
- Corredor, Eva L. György Lukács and the Literary Pretext. New York: Peter Lang, 1987.
- Joós, Ernest. Lukács' Last Autocriticism: The "Ontology." Atlantic Highlands: Humanities Press, 1983.
- Királyfalvi, Béla. The Aesthetics of György Lukács. Princeton: Princeton University Press, 1975.
- Mészáros, István. Lukács' Concept of Dialectic. London: Merlin, 1972.
- Rockmore, Tom. Irrationalism: Lukács and the Marxist View of Reason. Philadelphia: Temple University Press, 1993.
- Shafai, Fariborz. The Ontology of Georg Lukács: Studies in Materialist Dialectics. Avebury Series in Philosophy. Aldershot: Avebury, 1996.
- Varga, Csaba. The Place of Law in Lukács' World Concept. Budapest: Akadémiai Kiadó, 1985. (Rev. ed. 1998.)
- Vazsonyi, Nicholas. Lukács Reads Goethe: From Aestheticism to Stalinism. Studies in German Literature, Linguistics, and Culture. Columbia: Camden House, 1997.

=== Joint studies ===
- Goldmann, Lucien. Lukács and Heidegger: Towards a New Philosophy. London: Routledge and Kegan Paul, 1977.
- Marcus, Judith. Georg Lukács and Thomas Mann: A Study in the Sociology of Literature. Amherst: University of Massachusetts Press, 1987.
- Pike, David. Lukács and Brecht. Chapel Hill: University of North Carolina Press, 1985.
- Tihanov, Galin. The Master and the Slave: Lukács, Bakhtin, and the Ideas of Their Time. Oxford: Clarendon, 2000.

=== Bibliographies ===
- Ambrus, János. A Selected Bibliography of Works by Georg Lukács. Budapest: Lukács Archives and Library, 1988.
- Lapointe, François H. Georg Lukács and His Critics. Westport: Greenwood, 1983.
- Murphy, Peter. Writings By and About Georg Lukács. Bibliographical Series. New York: American Institute for Marxist Studies, 1976.
- Nordquist, Joan. Georg Lukács. Social Theory. Santa Cruz: Reference and Research Services, 1988.
