= Marxist aesthetics =

Aesthetic theory

Marxist aesthetics is a theory of aesthetics based on, or derived from, the theories of Karl Marx. It involves a dialectical and materialist, or dialectical materialist, approach to the application of Marxism to the cultural sphere, specifically areas related to taste such as art, beauty, and so forth. Marxists believe that economic and social conditions, and especially the class relations that derive from them, affect every aspect of an individual's life, from religious beliefs to legal systems to cultural frameworks. From one classic Marxist point of view, the role of art is not only to represent such conditions truthfully, but also to seek to improve them (social/socialist realism); however, this is a contentious interpretation of the limited but significant writing by Marx and Engels on art and especially on aesthetics. For instance, Nikolay Chernyshevsky, who greatly influenced the art of the early Soviet Union, followed the secular humanism of Ludwig Feuerbach more than he followed Marx.

Marxist aesthetics overlaps with the Marxist theory of art. It is particularly concerned with art practice, with the prescribing of artistic standards that are deemed socially beneficial. This materialist and socialist orientation may be seen to invoke the traditional aims of scientific inquiry and the scientific method.

Some notable Marxist aestheticians of varying tendencies include Anatoly Lunacharsky, Andrei Zhdanov, Mikhail Lifshitz, William Morris, Georgi Plekhanov, Theodor W. Adorno, Bertolt Brecht, Herbert Marcuse, Walter Benjamin, Antonio Gramsci, Georg Lukács, Terry Eagleton, Fredric Jameson, Louis Althusser, Jacques Rancière, Adolfo Sánchez Vázquez, Pierre Macherey, Maurice Merleau-Ponty and Raymond Williams. Roland Barthes must also be mentioned here.

Not all of these figures are solely concerned with aesthetics: in many cases, Marxist aesthetics forms only an important branch of their work, depending on how one defines the term. For example, a Marxist aesthetic may be latent in Brecht's work, but he formulated his own distinct theory of art and its social purpose.

One of the chief concerns of Marxist aesthetics is to unite Marx and Engels’ social and economic theory, or theory of the social base, to the domain of art and culture, the superstructure. These two terms, base and superstructure, became an important dichotomy in The German Ideology (1846), which however was not published during their lifetimes. Likewise Marx's early Economic and Philosophical Manuscripts of 1844, which, though widely regarded as important for treating the themes of sensuousness and alienation, first appeared only in 1932 (the slated 1846 publication was canceled) and in English only in 1959. The manuscripts were therefore unknown to art theorists during, for instance, the often antagonistic debates on art in the early Soviet Union between the constructivist avant garde and the proponents of socialist realism. The controversy over the unusual design of the original documents adds another twist.

Many theorists touch upon important themes of Marxist aesthetics without strictly being Marxist aestheticians, Joel Kovel, for instance, has extended the concepts of Marxian ecology which deeply implicates aesthetics. He is also a part of the struggle to bridge the space between Marx and Freud, which has Marxist aesthetics as a central concern. Current themes within the field include research on the effect of mass-produced industrial materials on the sensed environment, such as paints and colors. A strong current within the field involves linguistics and semiotics, and arguments over structuralism and post-structuralism, modernism and post-modernism, as well as feminist theory.

Visual artists, as diverse as Isaak Brodsky or Diego Rivera and Kasimir Malevich or Lyubov Popova, for example, for whom written theory is secondary, nevertheless may be said to be connected to Marxist aesthetics through their production of art, without necessarily declaring themselves aestheticians or Marxists in writing. Likewise, in this spirit Oscar Wilde, Dziga Vertov, Sergei Eisenstein, Orson Welles, Jean-Luc Godard, Pablo Picasso, Richard Paul Lohse, for example. Such a view could apply to many visual and other artists in many fields, even those who have no apparent and/or voiced connection to Marxist politics or even those ostensibly opposed; in this respect consider Anton Webern.

Probably it would be fair to say that two of the most influential writings in Marxist aesthetics in recent times, and apart from Marx himself and Lukacs, have been Walter Benjamin's essay The Work of Art in the Age of Mechanical Reproduction, and Herbert Marcuse's One-Dimensional Man. Louis Althusser has also contributed in significant ways to Marxist aesthetics, even generating secondary literature on the matter. His theory of ideology ("Ideology and Ideological State Apparatuses") has also had significant impacts on the field. This work has spilled over into Marxist educational theory and other fields as well.

The field remains polemical, with camps of modernists, post modernists, anti modernists, the avant garde, constructivists, and socialist realists all referencing back to an ostensible Marxist aesthetic theory that would underpin their art practices by grounding an art theory.

== See also ==
- Marxist literary criticism

== Bibliography ==
- Text Etc: Literary Theory: Marxist Views (formerly Poetry Magic)
- Understanding Brecht, Walter Benjamin, Verso Books, 2003, ISBN 978-1859844182.
- Aesthetics and Politics: Debates Between Bloch, Lukacs, Brecht, Benjamin, Adorno. 1980. Trans. ed. Ronald Taylor. London: Verso. ISBN 0-86091-722-3.
- Adorno, Theodor W. 2004. Aesthetic Theory. London: Continuum. ISBN 0-8264-7691-0.
- Brecht, Bertolt. 1964. Brecht on Theatre: The Development of an Aesthetic. Ed. and trans. John Willett. British edition. London: Methuen. ISBN 0-413-38800-X. USA edition. New York: Hill and Wang. ISBN 0-8090-3100-0.
- ---. 2000a. Brecht on Film and Radio. Ed. and trans. Marc Silberman. British edition. London: Methuen. ISBN 0-413-72500-6.
- ---. 2003a. Brecht on Art and Politics. Ed. and trans. Thomas Kuhn and Steve Giles. British edition. London: Methuen. ISBN 0-413-75890-7.
- Daly, Macdonald. A Primer in Marxist Aesthetics. London: Zoilus Press, 1999. ISBN 978-0-9522028-1-3
- Eagleton, Terry. 1990. The Ideology of the Aesthetic. Oxford and Malden, MA: Blackwell. ISBN 0-631-16302-6.
- Marcuse, Herbert. 1978. The Aesthetic Dimension: Toward a Critique of Marxist Aesthetics. Trans. Herbert Marcuse and Erica Sherover. Boston: Beacon Press.
- Marx, Karl and Frederick Engels. Karl Marx and Frederick Engels on Literature and Art. Nottingham: CCC Press, 2006. ISBN 1-905510-02-0
- Singh, Iona. 2012 "Color, Facture, Art and Design", Zero Books. ISBN 978-1-78099-629-5.
- Tedman, Gary. 2012. Aesthetics & Alienation, Zero Books. ISBN 978-1780993010.
- Rose, Margaret A. 1988. Marx's Lost Aesthetic: Karl Marx and the Visual Arts. Cambridge: Cambridge University Press. ISBN 978-0521369794.
- Sánchez Vázquez, Adolfo. "The Aesthetic Ideas of Marx", 1965.
- Sánchez Vázquez, Adolfo. "Art and Society: Essays in Marxist Aesthetics", 1973.
- Simon, Joshua. 2013. Neomaterialism, Sternberg Press, ISBN 978-3-943365-08-5.
