= Lukacs and Heidegger =

Book by Lucien Goldmann

Lukacs and Heidegger: Towards a New Philosophy
- Author: Lucien Goldmann
- Original title: Lukacs et Heidegger
- Language: French
- Subjects: György Lukács; Martin Heidegger
- Published: 1973
- Publication place: France
- Media type: Print
- Pages: 140 (2009 Routledge edition)
- ISBN: 978-0415564595 (2009 Routledge edition)

Lukacs and Heidegger: Towards a New Philosophy (French: Lukacs et Heidegger) is a book by Lucien Goldmann published after his death in 1973.

== Summary ==
Goldmann tries to bring together the Marxist concept of reification from György Lukács and the existential concept of Dasein from Martin Heidegger. He argues that the concept of Being in Heidegger was already present in the concept of Totality in Lukács. Lukács's critique of the alienation inherent in capitalism, is thus present in Dasein as an ontological concept. Both Lukács and Heidegger critique the reification or thing-ification of the human dasein. Inauthentic dasein is parallel to the failure of the historical subject to awaken to praxis.

Goldmann argues that the concept of reification as employed in Being and Time (1927) showed the strong influence of Lukács's work History and Class Consciousness (1923).

The fundamental goal of both Heidegger and Lukács was to overcome the traditional subject-object dichotomy of Western Philosophy.

== Reception ==
Laurence Paul Hemming, writing in Heidegger and Marx (2013), finds Goldmann's suggestion that Lukács influenced Heidegger to be highly unlikely at best.
