= Marx's notebooks on the history of technology =

Karl Marx wrote a number of notebooks on the history of technology which so far remain unpublished in English. Their whereabouts were for a long time unknown, but in the past they were read and discussed by Marxist researchers.

== History ==
Engels lists Marx's collection of material on technology as one of Marx's "specialisms" in correspondence outlining their mutual division of intellectual labour.

Marx directly refers to the notebooks in his letter to Engels of January 28, 1863 where he says

… I have re-read my notebooks (extracts) on technology, and am attending a practical (only experimental) course for workers on the same by Professor Willis (in Jermyn Street, the Institute for Geology, where Huxley also gave his lectures)… While re-reading the technological-historical excerpts, I came to the conclusion that, apart from the invention of gun-powder, the compass and printing - these necessary pre-requisites for bourgeois development - from the 16th to the mid-18th centuries, i.e. the period of the development of manufacture from craftsmanship until really large-scale industry, the two material foundations on which were based the preparations for mechanised industry within manufacturing were the clock and the mill …

Across his writing Marx makes frequent reference to his interest in technological developments, and these mentions are complemented by generic statements such as the need for a critical history of technology in the major footnote at the beginning of the chapter on "Machinery and Large Scale Industry" in Capital, Volume I:

A critical history of technology would show how little any of the inventions of the 18th century are the work of a single individual. Hitherto there is no such book. Darwin has interested us in the history of Nature's Technology, i.e., in the formation of the organs of plants and animals, which organs serve as instruments of production for sustaining life. Does not the history of the productive organs of man, of organs that are the material basis of all social organisation, deserve equal attention? And would not such a history be easier to compile, since, as Vico says, human history differs from natural history in this, that we have made the former, but not the latter? Technology discloses man's mode of dealing with Nature, the process of production by which, he sustains his life, and thereby also lays bare the mode of formation of his social relations, and of the mental conceptions that flow from them.

== Commentary and sources ==
György Lukács studied these notebooks while they existed in the archives in Moscow, and appears to refer to them in a 1925 article later published in English translation in the New Left Review criticizing what he saw as Bukharin's undue technicism. Lukács added a commentary on the methodological importance of this critique to the preface to the new edition (1967) of the English Merlin 1971 translation of History and Class Consciousness. Excerpts of Marx's notebooks are held in the International Institute of Social History.

Nathan Rosenberg published an essay on "Marx as a student of technology" in his Inside the Black Box; Donald MacKenzie wrote "Marx and the Machine" in Technology and Culture, which can also be found in his essay collection Knowing Machines; and Amy E. Wendling published a book on the notebooks entitled Karl Marx on Technology and Alienation. Lucia Pradella in her study of Marx's London Notebooks cites Hans-Peter Müller's transcribed edition in German.
