= Friedrich Wilhelm Schulz =

German military official, radical activist and publisher (1797–1860)

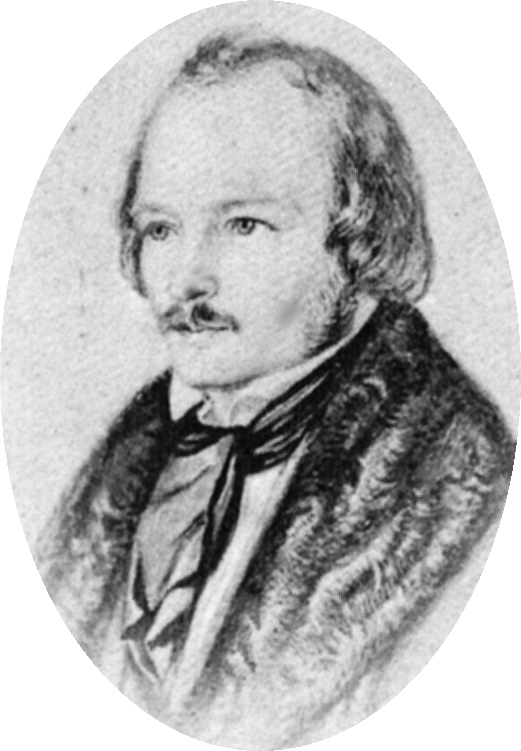
- Wilhelm Schulz c. 1820 - pencil drawing by an unknown artist
- Born: 13 March 1797; Darmstadt, Hesse, Holy Roman Empire
- Died: 9 January 1860 (aged 62); Hottingen, Switzerland
- Occupations: Officer, radical, and socialist publisher

Friedrich Wilhelm Schulz (often known as Wilhelm Schulz or after his second marriage Wilhelm Schulz-Bodmer; 13 March 1797 in Darmstadt – 9 January 1860 in Hottingen) was a German officer, political writer and radical liberal publisher in Hesse. His most famous works are Der Tod des Pfarrers Friedrich Ludwig Weidig (The Death of Pastor Friedrich Ludwig Weidig.) as well as Die Bewegung der Produktion (Movement of Production), which Karl Marx quoted extensively in his 1844 Manuscripts. Schulz was the first to describe the movement of society "as flowing from the contradiction between the forces of production and the mode of production," which would later form the basis of historical materialism. Marx continued to praise Schulz's work decades later when writing Das Kapital.

== Life ==
He was a friend of Georg Büchner and an early follower of Pierre-Joseph Proudhon. Convicted as a demagogue, he escaped from prison in 1834 and emigrated from Germany to Switzerland, where he worked as freelance political writer. In the year 1848 he was elected to the Frankfurt National Assembly, in which he belonged to the left.

== Youth and military career ==
Wilhelm Schulz came from a Protestant-Lutheran civil servant family in the Hessian-Darmstadt service. His grandfather Wilhelm Friedrich Ernst (1713–1786) and his father Johann Ludwig Adolf (1753–1823) protested several times against arbitrary acts by the landgrave's administration and were reprimanded for them. The high school student Schulz opposed the class prejudices of his teachers and was not transferred to the school year 1811 despite good performance. The fourteen-year-old decided to become a soldier and, with the support of his father, applied for admission to the ruler's body regiment.

Hesse-Darmstadt, meanwhile elevated to the Grand Duchy by Napoleon, belonged to the Confederation of the Rhine and its troops sided with France. In 1813 the sixteen-year-old Lieutenant Schulz had already fought in three battles, the last in the Battle of the Nations near Leipzig, where a French comrade saved him from drowning while retreating over the Elster. After the Confederation's change of front, he took part in two further campaigns on the Prussian-Austrian-Russian side until the final defeat of France in 1815.

== Political agitation and the first high treason trial ==
Between the campaigns, Schulz was given leave of absence from active duty and assigned to the University of Giessen to study mathematics and military science. In 1814 he got in touch with the brothers Karl and Adolf Ludwig Follen via the “ Teutsche Lesegesellschaft”, around whom the “Giessen Blacks”, the nucleus of the emerging fraternity movement, gathered. In 1816 he became a member of the Gießen Germanic Association and later, in 1821, he joined the Germania Gießen fraternity.

Back in the garrison, Schulz joined the group around Darmstadt lawyers Heinrich Karl Hofmann and Theodor Reh, which included opposition craftsmen, workers, students and officers. In contrast to the radical fraternity members, the “Darmstadt blacks” do not rely on overthrow by an elite of staunch revolutionaries, but turned to the people and called on citizens and peasants to passive resistance by refusing to pay taxes. In 1819 Schulz anonymously published the question and answer booklet about all sorts of things that are particularly needy in the German fatherland. The pamphlet, forerunner of the Hessischer Landbote, was written in the form of a catechism:

"Is an emperor, king, prince, or whatever the highest authority is called, also paid and received by the people?" "Yes. They are nothing more than the highest servants and officials of the people and should get so much that they can live in honor and as they deserve, but no more. As long as a citizen and farmer has to suffer from hunger and grief, it is absolutely wrong for princes – parasites, comedians, whores, horses and dogs to feed, hunt and feast and gossip and indulge in the sweat of the country." The question and answer booklet was widely distributed in the states of the German Confederation and went from hand to hand in 1819 during the peasant uprising in the Odenwald. When the demagogue persecution began after the murder of August von Kotzebue by the fraternity member Karl Ludwig Sand, Schulz was identified as the author of the book, arrested and charged with high treason after a year in custody. Since the military court was lenient because of the Hessian constitution, which was newly enacted in 1820, its closed-door trial ended with an acquittal. However, the pressure that the Crown Prince put on the officers' corps after this decision prompted Schulz to submit his departure

== Law studies, professional ban and activity as a journalist ==
After his discharge from military service, Schulz studied law in Giessen and passed the law faculty examination in 1823. But the Hessian authorities refused him admission to the court, which amounted to a ban on practicing the desired profession as a lawyer.

Between 1825 and 1831 Schulz worked as a correspondent and translator for Johann Friedrich Cottas Hesperus. Encyclopedic magazine for educated readers. With the series of articles published there, Errors and Truths, from the first years after the last war against Napoleon and the French, he distanced himself from the political romanticism of the fraternities and their “over-German national pride, in which one could for a short time even despise other peoples had fantasized ". He even went so far as to approve of the Karlsbad resolutions, which he later regretted, as it earned him an honorable mention in Goethe's diary, but it cost the friendship with his fellow campaigner Heinrich Karl Hofmann, who was affected by the "incomprehensible aberration of a man from such mind and heart ”wrote. In 1828 Schulz and the liberal lawyer Karl Buchner founded the Monday newspaper for friends of educated entertainment in Darmstadt. In the hope of founding a material existence on it, which failed a little later, he married Caroline Sartorius, the cousin of the “Darmstadt black” Christian Sartorius, after a nine-year engagement.

== Political journalism, second high treason trial and escape from dungeon ==
When political life began to move again in Germany after the July Revolution in France in 1830, Schulz took part in various Cottas newspaper projects that temporarily took him to Augsburg, Munich, Stuttgart and Karlsruhe. As an employee of the General Political Annals founded by Friedrich Wilhelm August Murhard and published by Cotta, Schulz became friends with the Baden liberals Karl von Rotteck and Carl Theodor Welcker. In Munich he met Johann Georg August Wirth and made contributions to his German tribune. At the end of 1831 he submitted his dissertation on the contemporary relationship between statistics and politics to the University of Erlangen. In January 1832 Cotta made the newly minted doctor juris editor-in-chief of Hesperus, but dismissed him that same month when Schulz tried to convert the magazine into a political daily newspaper and a liberal campaign organ. The Schulz couple were expelled from Württemberg.

Schulz was one of the participants in the Hambach Festival In early 1832, August Wirth, Philipp Jakob Siebenpfeiffer and Friedrich Schüler founded the German Press and Fatherland Association to ward off the increased censorship that went hand in hand with police persecution and military repression. The political protest movement reached broad sections of the population and raised its demands in numerous mass rallies. In May Schulz took part in the Hambach Festival, in June he appeared as a speaker at the festival in Wilhelmsbad. When the Bundestag banned further public festivals and the wearing of black, red and gold on 18 June, he wrote the pamphlet Das Recht des Deutschen Volkes and the resolutions of the Bundestag on behalf of the Preß- und Vaterlandsverein, in which he asked about the election of members of the opposition called on the state parliaments to refuse taxes and to arm the people. This writing was banned immediately. The same happened with other pamphlets from his pen and with the twice-weekly newspaper Der deutsche Volksbote, which he published in Offenbach am Main in 1833 together with Karl Buchner. His main work from this time, published under his full name, dedicated to Germany's unity through national representation, Rotteck and Welcker, was only banned in Prussia and Württemberg, but served as evidence in the subsequent trial against him. Schulz's biographer Walter Grab comments on this work: "There is hardly a second political forecast by a contemporary that predicted the events of 1848 in France and Germany with such precision."

In autumn 1833, six months after the Frankfurt Wachensturm, the time had come for the Hessian judicial authorities to arrest Schulz and try him. His defense lawyers August Emmerling and Theodor Reh could not prevent that he was tried as a civilian before a non-public military tribunal and sentenced to five years of strict arrest on 18 June 1834 "for continued attempt to commit the crime of violent alteration of the state constitution". Immediately after the start of his sentence at the Babenhausen Fortress, he and his wife made plans to escape. Caroline Schulz provided him with tools and connections. The outbreak succeeded in an adventurous way on the night of 30–31 December 1834. By New Year, Schulz was already in temporary safety in Alsace. He described his escape 12 years later in an exchange of letters between a state prisoner and his liberator.

== First exile in Strasbourg and Zurich ==
Reunited in Strasbourg, the Schulz couple made friends with the poet Georg Büchner, who was wanted as a co-author of the Hessischer Landbote. Since the city did not offer a safe asylum, Schulz applied for a teaching license at the university newly founded by the victorious Zurich liberals. Büchner followed his example, and from the autumn of 1836 his friends, now colleagues, lived next door to each other at Zurich Spiegelgasse 12. When Büchner fell seriously ill a few months later, the Schulz couple looked after him until his death on 19 February 1837. Schulz' Memories of Büchner are now considered one of the main sources for the last year of the poet's life.

Friedrich Wilhelm Schulz was one of the authors of the Rotteck-Welcker State Lexicon In the first years of his exile in Switzerland, Schulz dealt with economics, statistics and the political situation in Switzerland. The energetic movement that began with the rural population, which in 1831 had bloodlessly eliminated the domination of the nobility and patricians in the so-called Regeneration and had given several cantons, including Zurich, liberal constitutions, corresponded to his ideal. Carefully monitored by Metternich's agents because of the “conditions in Switzerland influencing Germany”, he delivered correspondent reports to Cottas Augsburger Allgemeine, Brockhaus' Blätter für literary entertainment, Campes Telegraph for Germany and, from 1842, to the Rheinische Zeitung edited by Karl Marx.

Schulz exercised an influence on Marx through his study The Movement of Production and the theory of impoverishment, which is carefully substantiated by statistics, which can be demonstrated in the economic-political manuscripts. Like Marx, Schulz saw the polarization of society in poor and rich as a necessary consequence of the capitalist mode of production. In contrast to him, he viewed bourgeois property relations as an unchangeable result of historical development and, like Lorenz von Stein, whose writings he knew, expected the social contradiction to be abolished from the welfare state and Christian ethics. The communist and anarchist movements seemed to him to be an inevitable reaction of the poor to the exploitative economic system and its support, the absolutist state, but their methods were reprehensible, their goals illusory and their leaders therefore dangerous fantasists and fanatical enthusiasts. Communism and nihilism, (as which he understood the doctrinal atheism of the left Hegelians ), he described as “the twin bears, who, with their intrusive friendship with the people, endanger and botch the holy cause of liberating the people from mental pressure and physical distress in all places where they eat each other."

Schulz also expressed his warnings against communism and anarchism in the relevant keyword articles in the Rotteck-Welcker State Lexicon. For this "Bible of German Liberalism" he wrote over 50 articles and many additions. In addition, he published several extensive books in the literary comptoir in Zurich and Winterthur. This publishing house belonged to the German emigrants Julius Fröbel and Adolf Ludwig Follen, Schulz's old acquaintance from Giessen, and in the early 1840s it developed into an important publication site for German “censorship refugees”.

Here in 1843 Schulz published The Death of Pastor Friedrich Ludwig Weidig anonymously. A documented and documented contribution to the assessment of the secret criminal process and the political situation in Germany. Weidig had co-authored the Hessian country messenger and – four days after Büchner – died in the Darmstadt dungeon under dubious circumstances. The Hessian judicial authorities presented his death as a suicide. Schulz documented the inhumane conditions of detention and the severe abuse of Weidig by his inquisitors, examined the circumstances of his death and came to the conclusion that it is very likely that Weidig had been murdered by his examining magistrate Konrad Georgi and his assistants to cover up the attacks was. Schulz's indictment caused a domestic political storm, much like Zola's " J'accuse " later. The German governments tried in vain to stem the wave of protests against the secret justice system. Schulz repeatedly took up pen in the journalistic debate about Weidig's death. Co-authored by Welcker, the text Secret Inquisition, Censorship and Cabinet Justice in Perishable Covenants was published in 1845. Final negotiation with many new files on the Weidig trial. But that did not close the file: “The waves of excitement over the judicial murder of Weidig were still high in the revolution of 1848.” In fact, the elimination of the inquisition process and the secret justice system are among their few lasting successes. Schulz's role in enforcing the rule of law in political criminal proceedings has only recently been properly appreciated. His biographer writes: "The introduction of orderly jurisdiction, which was in the interests of the general population and without which a modern state is unthinkable, was in no small part due to the struggle of Wilhelm Schulz and his companions."

The Zurich atheism dispute in 1845 (Ruge, Follen, Heinzen, Schulz). Caricature by an unknown artist. Wilhelm Schulz's workload did not stop him from cultivating a number of friendships with his wife, especially with poets. He met Georg Herwegh, Hoffmann von Fallersleben, Gottfried Keller and Ferdinand Freiligrath in the Follenschen house "am Sonnenbühl", the center of the Zurich emigrants. In 1845 Schulz and Keller sided with Follen when he was involved with Arnold Ruge and Karl Heinzen in the “Zurich atheism controversy”. When Ruge attacked Schulz's personal honor, he challenged him to a duel. Ruge did not respond to the demand and began to oppose it journalistically.

Caroline Schulz died in early 1847 after a serious illness. Shortly before her death, she had initiated a marriage between her long-time friend Katharina Bodmer and Schulz in the event of her death. In fact, the two married in September 1847 at the Freiligrath family's new London residence. In late autumn of the same year Schulz served as an officer in the federal army for the brief duration of the Sonderbund War.

== Selected works ==
- Irrtümer und Wahrheiten aus den ersten Jahren nach dem letzten Kriege gegen Napoleon und die Franzosen. Darmstadt 1825. (Buchveröffentlichung der Artikelserie für die Zeitschrift Hesperus).
- Das Eine, was Deutschland Not tut. In: Allgemeine Politische Annalen. Hrsg. von Carl von Rotteck. 7. Bd., 1. Heft, Juli 1831, S. 1–44.
- An die versammelten Vertreter des deutschen Volks. In: Deutsche Tribüne. Ein Konstitutionelles Tagblatt. Hrsg. von August Wirth. Nr. 2, 2. Juli 1831.
- Über das zeitgemäße Verhältnis der Statistik zur Politik. In: Beilage zum Morgenblatt für gebildete Stände. Nr. 310, 25. November 1831. (Druckfassung von Schulz' Erlanger Dissertation).
- Die Bewegung der Production. Eine geschichtlich-statistische Abhandlung zur Grundlegung einer neuen Wissenschaft des Staates und der Gesellschaft. Zürich und Winterthur 1843. MDZ Reader (Neudruck mit einer Einleitung von Gerhard Kade. Glashütten im Taunus 1974).
- Der Tod des Pfarrers Dr. Friedrich Ludwig Weidig. Ein aktenmäßiger und urkundlich belegter Beitrag zur Beurteilung des geheimen Strafprozesses und der politischen Zustände Deutschlands. Zürich und Winterthur 1843. Digitalisat (Anonym erschienen. Fotomechanischer Nachdruck. Leipzig 1975).
- Geheime Inquisition, Zensur und Kabinettsjustiz in verderblichem Bunde. Schlussverhandlung mit vielen neuen Aktenstücken über den Prozeß Weidig. Karlsruhe 1845. (Mitverfasser: Carl Theodor Welcker).
- Die wahrhaftige Geschichte vom deutschen Michel und seinen Schwestern. Nach bisher unbekannten Quellen bearbeitet und durch sechs Bilder von M. Disteli erläutert. Zürich und Winterthur 1845. MDZ Reader (Anonym erschienen, Schulz' größter buchhändlerischer Erfolg.)
- Briefwechsel eines Staatsgefangenen mit seiner Befreierin. 2 Bdd. Mannheim 1846. BSB-Digitalisat: Bd. 1 und Bd. 2.
- Eine literarische Fehde über den neuphilosophischen Nihilismus. In: Blätter für literarische Unterhaltung. Nr. 104, Leipzig 14. April 1846.
- Denkschrift über die internationale Politik Deutschlands. Darmstadt 1848. MDZ Reader
- Deutschlands gegenwärtige politische Lage und die nächste Aufgabe der demokratischen Partei. Frankfurt 1849. (Analyse der Gründe für die Niederlage der Revolution.)
- Die Rettung der Gesellschaft aus den Gefahren der Militärherrschaft. Eine Untersuchung auf geschichtlicher und statistischer Grundlage über die finanziellen und volkswirtschaftlichen, die politischen und sozialen Einflüsse des Heerwesens. Leipzig 1859.
