= History and Class Consciousness =

1923 book by György Lukács

History and Class Consciousness: Studies in Marxist Dialectics
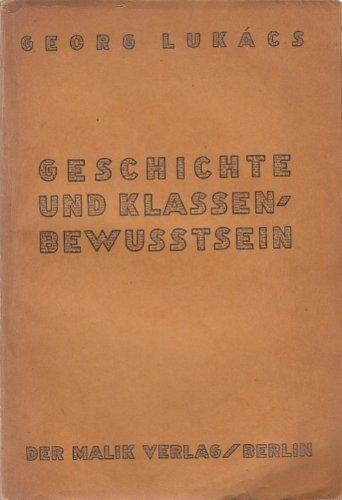
- Cover of the first edition
- Author: György Lukács
- Original title: Geschichte und Klassenbewußtsein: Studien über marxistische Dialektik
- Translator: Rodney Livingstone
- Language: German
- Subjects: Marxism
- Publisher: Malik-Verlag, The Merlin Press
- Publication date: 1923
- Publication place: Germany
- English publication date: 1971
- Media type: Print (hardcover and paperback)
- Pages: 356 (English edition)
- ISBN: 0-262-62020-0

History and Class Consciousness: Studies in Marxist Dialectics (German: Geschichte und Klassenbewußtsein – Studien über marxistische Dialektik) is a collection of essays by the Hungarian Marxist philosopher György Lukács, first published in 1923. It is a seminal work in the development of Western Marxism, moving beyond the economism and determinism of the Second International and exploring the dialectical relationship between the subject and object of history, particularly class consciousness and reification.

The book is the work for which Lukács is best known. Nevertheless, it was condemned in the Soviet Union and Eastern Europe, and Lukács later repudiated its ideas, coming to believe that in it he had confused Hegel's concept of alienation with that of Marx's.

== Summary ==
Lukács attempts a philosophical justification of Bolshevism, stressing the distinction between actual class consciousness and "ascribed" class consciousness, the attitudes the proletariat would have if they were aware of all of the facts. Marx's idea of class consciousness is seen as a thought which directly intervenes into social being. Claiming to return to Marx's methodology, Lukács re-emphasizes the philosopher Georg Wilhelm Friedrich Hegel's influence on the philosopher Karl Marx, emphasizes dialectics over materialism, makes concepts such as alienation and reification central to his theory, and argues for the primacy of the concept of totality. Lukács depicts Marx as an eschatological thinker. He develops a version of Hegelian Marxism that contrasted with the emerging Soviet interpretations of Marxism based on the work of the philosopher Georgi Plekhanov and the dialectics of nature inspired by the philosopher Friedrich Engels.

In the essay "What is Orthodox Marxism?", Lukács argues that methodology is what distinguishes Marxism: even if all its substantive propositions were rejected, it would remain valid because of its distinctive method. According to Lukács, "Orthodox Marxism, therefore, does not imply the uncritical acceptance of the results of Marx’s investigations. It is not the ‘belief’ in this or that thesis, nor the exegesis of a ‘sacred’ book. On the contrary, orthodoxy refers exclusively to method. It is the scientific conviction that dialectical materialism is the road to truth and that its methods can be developed, expanded and deepened only along the lines laid down by its founders."

Lukács maintains that it is through Marx's use of the dialectic that capitalist society can be seen as essentially reified and the proletariat viewed as the true subject of history and the only possible salvation of humanity. All truth, including Marx's materialist conception of history itself, is to be seen in relation to the proletariat's historical mission. Truth, no longer given, must instead be understood in terms of the relative moments in the process of the unfolding of the real union of theory and praxis: the totality of social relations. This union must be grasped through proletarian consciousness and directed party action in which subject and object are one.

History and Class Consciousness was republished in 1967 with a new preface in which Lukács described the circumstances that allowed him to read Marx's newly re-discovered Economic and Philosophic Manuscripts of 1844 in 1930, two years before their publication. After reading them, Lukács concluded that in History and Class Consciousness he had made a basic mistake, that of confusing Hegel's and Marx's respective concepts of alienation. To Hegel, alienation is the objectivity of nature, but for Marx, it refers not to natural objects but to what happens to the products of labor when social relationships make them commodities or capital.

History and Class Consciousness was denounced by Lukács himself as wrong, throughout his life. George Lichtheim details this, in his appraisal of Lukács' oeuvre. However, in 1996, a manuscript kept "secret for more than seventy years" was published for the first time, casting significant doubt on the degree to which Lukács' public self-repudiations reflected his actual beliefs on the merits of History and Class Consciousness. In the manuscript, published in English as A Defence of History and Class Consciousness: Tailism and Dialectic, Lukács defended History and Class Consciousness from his critics.

== Reception ==
History and Class Consciousness is influential and the work for which Lukács is best known. Lukács' pronouncements in "What is Orthodox Marxism?" have become famous. History and Class Consciousness helped to create Western Marxism in Europe and the United States and influenced the sociologist Karl Mannheim's work on the sociology of knowledge. However, it led to Lukács being condemned in Eastern Europe and the Soviet Union. In response to the Communist attack on his work, Lukács wrote an essay on the Russian revolutionary Vladimir Lenin's views (Lenin: A Study in the Unity of His Thought, 1924). In his later career, Lukács repudiated the ideas of History and Class Consciousness, in particular the belief in the proletariat as a "subject-object of history". As late as 1925-1926, he still defended these ideas, in an unfinished manuscript, which he called Tailism and the Dialectic. It was not published until 1996 in Hungarian. It appeared in English in 2000 under the title A Defence of History and Class Consciousness.

The political scientist David McLellan maintains that the publication of Marx's key earlier writings vindicated Lukács's interpretation of Marx. The philosopher Lucio Colletti believes that although the publication of those writings disproved some of Lukács's assumptions, the problem of the nature of alienation remained valid. The critic Frederick Crews writes that in History and Class Consciousness, Lukács "made a fatefully ingenious attempt to abolish, through metaphysical prestidigitation, the newly apparent chasm between Marx's historical laws and the triumph of Bolshevism."

History and Class Consciousness was a crucial text for the French Situationist theorist Guy Debord, although Debord maintained that Lukács, by arguing that the Bolshevik party provided a mediation between theory and practice that enabled proletarians to determine events within their organization instead of being spectators of them, was describing the opposite of how it functioned in reality. Others influenced by History and Class Consciousness include the philosopher Jürgen Habermas, whose initial understanding of Marx came through the book, and the evolutionary geneticist Richard Lewontin, the neurobiologist Steven Rose, and the psychologist Leon Kamin. The philosopher Tom Rockmore has described History and Class Consciousness as "brilliant." The economists M. C. Howard and J. E. King praise the sophistication of Lukács' Hegelian understanding of how to specify the interests of the proletariat. The philosopher Slavoj Žižek describes the Lukács of History and Class Consciousness as "the philosopher of Lenin's historical moment". Žižek credits Lukács with bringing together the topic of commodity fetishism and reification with the topic of the Party and revolutionary strategy.

Some writers have compared Lukács to the philosopher Martin Heidegger, though the existence of any relationship between the two has been disputed. The critic George Steiner writes that Lukács shares with Heidegger "a commitment to the concrete, historically existential quality of human acts of perception and intellection." In spite of Steiner's assessment of a supposedly similar view upon history and historical acts shared by Lukacs and Heidegger, Theodor W. Adorno, whose own Critical Theory was deeply indebted to History and Class Consciousness, maintained in his Negative Dialectics that Heidegger lacked any proper concept of history and historicity, and especially any that could be compatible to Marxist thought in any way, shape, or form. The Marxist philosopher Lucien Goldmann argued that the concept of reification as employed in Being and Time (1927) was influenced by Lukács, although Heidegger never mentions Lukács in his writing and Laurence Paul Hemming finds the suggestion that Lukács influenced Heidegger to be highly unlikely at best. The historian Michel Trebitsch endorsed Goldmann's view that Heidegger was indebted to Lukács. Trebitsch compared History and Class Consciousness to the philosopher Henri Lefebvre's La Conscience mystifiée (1936), finding them to be similar in the way that they both "offered a Marxist theory of consciousness breaking with the theory of transparency of being which had informed the philosophical tradition."

== See also ==
- Cultural hegemony
- False consciousness
- György Lukács bibliography
- Lukacs and Heidegger: Towards a New Philosophy
- The Society of the Spectacle
