= Transcendental homelessness =

Philosophical term

Transcendental homelessness (German: transzendentale Obdachlosigkeit) is a philosophical term coined by George Lukács in his 1914–15 essay Theory of the Novel. Lukács quotes Novalis at the top of the essay, "Philosophy is really homesickness—the desire to be everywhere at home." The essay unfolds closely related to this notion of Novalis—that modern philosophy "mourns the absence of a pre-subjective, pre-reflexive anchoring of reason" and is searching to be grounded but cannot achieve this goal due to philosophy's modern discursive nature.

In Theory of the Novel, with regards to literature, Lukács suggests that the era of Homeric epics was characterized by a "closed totality" where the pre-reflexive hero is connected to a cosmic destiny (a home of the soul) so that loneliness is transformed into a solid position in the universe. In the modern novel, however, the subject is without ties to the eternal and thus loneliness is more pronounced—the loneliness of a soul that cannot find a cosmic (transcendental) home.

He labeled modern novels, especially Goethe's Wilhelm Meister, and those of Tolstoy and Dostoevsky, as the artistic expression of the metaphysical conditions of this epoch.
