= Economic and Philosophic Manuscripts of 1844 =

German-language work by Karl Marx, published 1932

- 1964 International Publishers edition, edited with an introduction by Dirk J. Struik
- Editor: David Riazanov
- Author: Karl Marx
- Translator: Martin Milligan
- Language: German
- Genre: Marxist theory, Marxist economics
- Published: 1932
- Publication place: Berlin, Germany
- English publication date: 1959 (Moscow: Progress Publishers)

The Economic and Philosophic Manuscripts of 1844 (German: Ökonomisch-philosophische Manuskripte aus dem Jahre 1844), also known as the Paris Manuscripts (Pariser Manuskripte) or as the 1844 Manuscripts, are a series of unfinished notes written between April and August 1844 by Karl Marx. They were compiled and published posthumously in 1932 by the Soviet Union's Marx–Engels–Lenin Institute. They were first published in their original German in Berlin, and there followed a republication in the Soviet Union in 1933, also in German.

The Manuscripts provide a critique of classical political economy grounded in the philosophies of Georg Wilhelm Friedrich Hegel and Ludwig Feuerbach. The work is best known for its articulation of Marx's argument that the conditions of modern industrial societies result in the estrangement (or alienation) of wage-workers from their own products, from their own work, and in turn from themselves and from each other. Marx argues that workers are forced by the capitalist productive process to work solely to satisfy their basic needs. As such, they merely exist as commodities in a constant state of drudgery, evaluated solely by their monetary value, with capital assuming the status of a good in and of itself.

The publication of the Manuscripts greatly altered the reception of Marx by situating his work within a theoretical framework that had until then been unavailable to his followers. While the text's importance was often downplayed by orthodox Marxists as being "philosophical" or "anthropological" rather than "scientific", the notebooks provide insight into Marx's thought at the time of its first formulation.

== Context ==
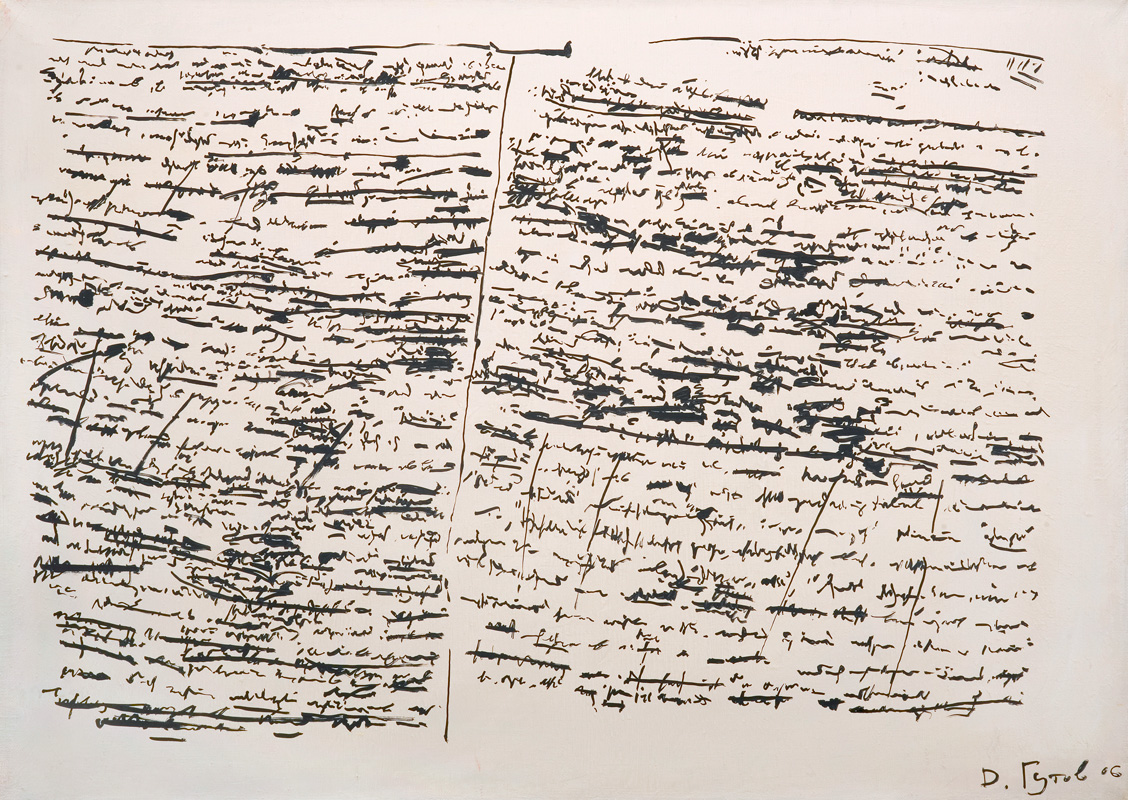
Page from the Economic and Philosophic Manuscripts of 1844

The Manuscripts were composed during the summer of 1844, when Marx was 25 or 26 years old. Marx was at this time resident in Paris, then seen as the center of socialist thought. Several members of the philosophical milieu that he then belonged to, the Young Hegelians, had moved to Paris in the previous year to establish a journal, the Deutsch–Französische Jahrbücher. Marx himself had taken up residence in 38 Rue Vaneau, in the Left Bank of the city, in October 1843. In Paris, he came into contact with German revolutionary artisans and secret meetings of French proletarian societies. It was in this period that Marx made the acquaintance of Pierre-Joseph Proudhon, Louis Blanc, Heinrich Heine, Georg Herwegh, Mikhail Bakunin, Pierre Leroux and most importantly, Friedrich Engels.

The Manuscripts evolved from a proposal Marx had made in the Jahrbücher to write separate pamphlets critiquing the various topics of Georg Wilhelm Friedrich Hegel's philosophy of law — law, morals, politics, etc. — ending with a general treatise that would show their interrelations. The notebooks are a fragmentary, incomplete work, consisting of four manuscripts that range from extracts from books with comments, loosely connected notes and reflections on various topics, to a comprehensive assessment of Hegel's philosophy.

The text marks the first appearance together of what Engels described as the three constituent elements in Marx's thought: German idealist philosophy, French socialism, and English economics. In addition to Hegel, Marx addresses the work of various socialist writers, and that of the fathers of political economy: Francois Quesnay, Adam Smith, David Ricardo, Jean-Baptiste Say, and James Mill. Die Bewegung der Produktion by Friedrich Wilhelm Schulz is also a key source. Ludwig Feuerbach's humanism is an influence that underlies all of Marx's notes.

Because the 1844 Manuscripts show Marx's thought at the time of its early genesis, their publication in the twentieth century profoundly affected analysis of Marx and Marxism. At the time of their first publication, their most striking feature was their dissimilarity to the philosophy of dialectical materialism that was official within the Soviet Union and the European Communist Parties. The Manuscripts offer a trenchant analysis of Hegel that is far more difficult and complex than the "dialectics of nature" that Georgi Plekhanov and his disciple Lenin had derived from Engels's Anti-Dühring.

== Terminology ==
István Mészáros notes that the language and terminology of the Manuscripts are one of the work's main difficulties. He mentions that a key term "Aufhebung" can be translated from German to English simultaneously as "transcendence", "suppression", "preserving" and "overcoming". Christopher J. Arthur comments that the term, which appears in Hegel's Science of Logic, has in ordinary language the double meaning of "to abolish" and "to preserve". Arthur translates the word as "supersede" when the stress is more on abolition, and as "sublate" when the emphasis is more on preservation. Gregory Benton translates the word as "transcendence" and "supersession", and notes that Marx's concept of "critique" is an instance of this double movement.

A second terminological difficulty is the translation of the German words "Entäusserung" and "Entfremdung". While both words can be translated to English as "alienation", Entfremdung is often translated as "estrangement" and Entäusserung as "alienation", to draw a distinction between the two concepts. Christopher J. Arthur notes that Entäusserung is an unusual German word that can also be translated as "renunciation", "parting with", "relinquishment", "externalization", "divestiture" or "surrender". Arthur believes "externalization" is the closest of these translations, but he avoids using this word as it may be confused with a distinct term that Marx uses elsewhere: "Vergegenständlichung" or "objectification". Arthur claims "Entfremdung" is a narrower concept than "Entäusserung" in that it applies only to cases of interpersonal estrangement. He takes estrangement to be a state and alienation to be a process.

The dialectical structure of Marx's theory is another difficulty of the text, as the definition of certain key concepts can be hard to understand for those trained in positivist and empiricist philosophical traditions. What is more, the meaning of certain terms borrowed from Marx's contemporaries such as Feuerbach is often changed by Marx's appropriation of them.

== Themes ==
In the Manuscripts, Marx relates economic categories to a philosophical interpretation of man's position in nature. Marx's notebooks provide a general philosophical analysis of the basic concepts of political economy: capital, rent, labor, property, money, commodities, needs, and wages. Their key concept appears when Marx uses philosophical terminology to advance a critique of capitalist society based in "alienation". Marx's theory is adapted (not without changes) from Hegel's Phenomenology of Spirit (1807) and Feuerbach's The Essence of Christianity (1841). Alienation is not merely a descriptive concept, it is a call for de-alienation through radical change of the world.

=== Alienated labor ===
The first part of Marx's first manuscript mainly consists of excerpts or paraphrases from the economic texts he was reading at the time. These excerpts are divided into three sections: wages, capital, and rent, each occupying one of the three vertical columns on Marx’s pages. In the first section, Marx, drawing on Adam Smith, discusses the bitter struggle between capitalists and workers over wages. This struggle reduces the worker to the status of a commodity. Whether society’s wealth is growing or shrinking, the worker suffers. In a declining economy, workers experience increasing misery; in a growing economy, their misery is more complicated, and in a stable economy, they face stagnant suffering. Marx critiques political economy for treating humans like commodities, similar to objects like houses. Political economy does not consider man in his free time or as a fully human being; this is left to other disciplines.

Marx then rises above political economy to ask two key questions based on his reading:

- What does it mean for humanity that most people are reduced to abstract labor?
- What mistakes do reformists make when they aim to raise wages or promote equality in wages, seeing them as the solution to social problems?

To answer these, Marx quotes from three sources. First, German liberal writer Wilhelm Schulz on the pauperization of workers, the dehumanizing effects of machinery, and the growing number of women and children working. Second, Constantin Pecqueur’s thoughts on workers’ dependence and degradation under capitalism. Third, Eugene Buret’s analysis of the misery and exploitation of the proletariat. In the second section, Marx focuses on the "Profit of Capital." He quotes Adam Smith to define capital as the power to command labor and its products. He then explains how capitalists profit from wages and raw materials, the motivations driving capitalists, and the accumulation of capital and competition between capitalists. He draws from Smith, Ricardo, Schulz, and Pecqueur to elaborate these points.

In his third section, Marx discusses rent as a manifestation of the perpetual opposition of interests inherent in capitalist society. He critiques Smith’s view that the interests of landlords and society are always aligned, arguing instead that the more an individual benefits, the less society does. Marx outlines the similarities between landlords and capitalists and concludes that, ultimately, society is divided into two main classes: workers and capitalists. He argues that the character of landed property has radically changed since feudal times, and neither large estates nor small properties can avoid precipitating a crisis.

Marx next addresses the problem of alienated labor. Marx criticizes the classical economists for having an abstract and superficial understanding of labor, arguing that their theories miss the deeper connections between various economic factors. Unlike classical economists, who start with presuppositions and offer general laws, Marx aims to explain the essential connections among private property, competition, division of labor, capital, and land ownership. He criticizes the economists for constructing an abstract, fictitious state of nature, similar to how theology explains the origin of evil through the fall of man, instead of understanding the historical and necessary development of economic factors.

Marx further develops the idea of alienation, arguing that a worker is alienated in four ways:

1. From the product he produces
2. From the act by which he produces this product
3. From his nature and himself
4. From other human beings

Marx starts with the fact that the more a worker produces, the more impoverished he becomes. Marx explains this by stating that in the process of alienation, the product of labor becomes something external to the worker, a power independent of him. This alienation means that the product of labor is no longer owned by the worker but becomes something that confronts him as hostile or alien. Marx draws a parallel with religion, stating that the more man attributes to God, the less he retains of his own essence. Similarly, in the economy, the more a worker invests in his product, the less control he has over it, as it becomes an alien force. This alienation deprives workers not only of their connection to the products they create but also of the objects they need to live. The relationship between the worker and his product, Marx argues, is the core of understanding labor under capitalism.

The act of production of the object is the second dimension of alienation. It is forced labor and not voluntary. The labor is external to the worker and not part of his nature. The worker's activity belongs to another, causing the loss of his self. The worker is only at ease in his animal functions of eating, drinking and procreating. In his distinctly human functions, he is made to feel like an animal.

The third dimension of alienation that Marx discusses is man's alienation from his species. Marx here uses Feuerbachian terminology to describe man as a "species-being". Man is a self-conscious creature who can appropriate for his own use the whole realm of inorganic nature. While other animals produce, they produce only what is immediately necessary. Man, on the other hand, produces universally and freely. He is able to produce according to the standard of any species and at all times knows how to apply an intrinsic standard to the object. Man thus creates according to the laws of beauty. This transformation of inorganic nature is what Marx calls man's "life-activity", and it is man's essence. Man has lost his species-being because his life-activity has been turned into a mere means of existence.

Finally, Marx discusses alienation in social relations. He argues that when a worker is alienated from his own labor, this alienation extends to his relationships with other people, as each individual in a capitalist system views others through the lens of their role as workers. Marx explains that if the product of labor does not belong to the worker but to another person, this alienation arises because the worker’s activity is controlled by someone else.

The key point, Marx concludes, is that private property, which seems to precede alienated labor, is actually a consequence of it. Private property, like gods in theology, is an effect rather than a cause. The relation of the worker to his labor creates the relationship of the capitalist to labor and thus forms the basis for the existence of private property. Marx criticizes classical economics for treating wages and private property as separate, arguing that they are inherently connected, and that increasing wages cannot restore the worker’s humanity or significance. He concludes that equality in wages, as proposed by thinkers like Proudhon, would only perpetuate the alienation of labor.

Marx ends by stating that universal human emancipation is tied to the emancipation of the worker. The servitude of the worker reflects the servitude of all humanity, and the transformation of the worker’s relation to production will lead to the broader liberation of humanity.

=== Communism ===
Marx discusses his conception of communism in his third manuscript. For Marx, communism is "the positive expression of the abolition of private property". Marx here claims that previous socialist writers had offered only partial, unsatisfactory insights on the overcoming of alienation. He mentions Proudhon, who advocated the abolition of capital, Fourier, who advocated a return to agricultural labor and Saint-Simon, who advocated the correct organization of industrial labor. Marx discusses two forms of communism that he deems inadequate. The first is "crude communism" — the universalization of private property. This form of communism "negates the personality of man in every sphere," as it does not abolish the category of worker but instead extends it to all men. It is an "abstract negation of the entire world of culture and civilization." Here the only community is a community of (alienated) labor and the only equality is one of wages paid out by the community as universal capitalist. The second form of communism that Marx sees as incomplete is of two sorts: "(a) still of a political nature, democratic or despotic; (b) with the abolition of the state, but still essentially incomplete and influenced by private property, i.e. by the alienation of man." David McLellan takes Marx to here refer to the utopian communism of Etienne Cabet as democratic, the despotic communism to be the dictatorship of the proletariat advocated by the followers of Gracchus Babeuf, and the abolition of the state to be the communism of Théodore Dézamy.

Having discussed the nature of "crude communism", Marx describes his own idea of communism:

Communism is the positive supersession of private property as human self-estrangement, and therefore as the true appropriation of the human essence through and for man; it is the complete restoration of man to himself as a social, i.e., human, being, a restoration which has become conscious and which takes place within the entire wealth of previous periods of development. This communism, as fully developed naturalism, equals humanism, and as fully developed humanism equals naturalism; it is the genuine resolution of the conflict between man and nature, and between man and man, the true resolution of the conflict between existence and being, between objectification and self-affirmation, between freedom and necessity, between individual and species. It is the solution of the riddle of history and knows itself to be the solution.

Marx discusses three aspects of his conception of communism in depth: its historical bases, its social character and its regard for the individual.

Marx firstly draws a distinction between his own communism and other "underdeveloped" forms of communism. He cites the communism of Cabet and Francois Villegardelle as examples of communism that justify themselves by appealing to historical forms of community that were opposed to private property. Where this communism appeals to isolated aspects or epochs of past history, Marx's communism, on the other hand, is based in the "entire movement of history"; it finds "both its empirical and its theoretical basis in the movement of private property, or to be more exact, of the economy." The most basic alienation of human life is expressed in the existence of private property, and this alienation occurs in man's real life—the economic sphere. Religious alienation occurs only in man's consciousness. The overcoming of private property will thus be the overcoming of all other alienations: religion, the family, the state, etc.

Marx secondly claims that the relation of man to himself, to other men and to what he produces in an unalienated situation shows that it is the social character of labor that is basic. Marx believes that there is a reciprocal relationship between man and society: society produces man and is produced by him. Just as there is a reciprocal relationship between man and society, so is there between man and nature: "society is therefore the perfected unity in essence of man with nature, the true resurrection of nature, the realized naturalism of man and the realized humanism of nature." Man's essential capacities are produced in social intercourse: when working in isolation, he performs a social act by virtue of being human; even thinking, which uses language, is a social activity.

This emphasis on the social aspects of man's being does not destroy man's individuality: "Man, however much he may therefore be a particular individual—and it is just this particularity which he makes him an individual and a real individual communal being — is just as much the totality, the ideal totality, the subjective experience of thought and experienced society for itself."

The rest of Marx's third manuscript explicates his conception of the total, all-sided, unalienated man. Marx believes the supersession of private property will be a total liberation of all human faculties: seeing, hearing, smelling, tasting, touching, thinking, observing, feeling, desiring, acting and loving will all become means of appropriating reality. It is difficult for alienated man to imagine this, as private property has conditioned men so that they can only imagine an object to be theirs when they actually use it. Even then, the object is only employed as a means of sustaining life, which is understood as consisting of labor and the creation of capital. Marx believes that all physical and intellectual senses have been replaced by a single alienation — that of having. The "supersession of private property", Marx claims, "is therefore the complete emancipation of all human senses and attributes." Need or satisfaction will lose their egoistic nature, and nature will lose its mere utility "in the sense that its use has become human use". When man is no longer lost in an object, the manner in which his faculties appropriate the object becomes totally different. The object that unalienated man appropriates corresponds to his nature. A starving man can only appreciate food in a purely animal way, and a dealer in minerals sees only value, and not beauty, in his wares. The transcendence of private property will liberate man's faculties to become human faculties. A full and harmonious development of man's cultural potentialities will arise, where abstract intellectual oppositions — "subjectivism and objectivism, spiritualism and materialism, activity and passivity" — will disappear. "The practical energy of man" will instead tackle the real problems of life.

In a passage that anticipates Marx's later detailed accounts of historical materialism, Marx next claims that it is the history of industry — rather than that of religion, politics and art — that reveals man's essential faculties. Industry reveals man's capabilities and psychology and is thus the basis for any science of man. The immense growth of industry has allowed natural science to transform the life of man. Just as Marx earlier established a reciprocal relationship between man and nature, so does he believe that natural science will one day include the science of man and the science of man will include natural science. Marx believes that human sense-experience, as described by Feuerbach, can form the basis of a single all-embracing science.

=== Critique of Hegel ===
The section of the Manuscripts that follows Marx's discussion of communism concerns his critique of Hegel. Marx deems it necessary to discuss the Hegelian dialectic because Hegel has grasped the essence of man's labor in a manner that was hidden from the classical economists. Despite his abstract and mental understanding of labor, Hegel has correctly discerned that labor is the creator of value. The structure of Hegel's philosophy accurately reflects the real economic alienation of man in his work process. Marx believes Hegel has made very real discoveries but has "mystified" them. He argues that Feuerbach is the only critic who has a constructive attitude to Hegel. However, he also uses Hegel to illuminate weaknesses in Feuerbach's approach.

The greatness of Hegel's dialectic lies in its view of alienation as a necessary stage in mankind's evolution: humanity creates itself by a process of alienation alternating with the transcendence of that alienation. Hegel sees labor as an alienating process that realizes the essence of man: man externalizes his essential powers in an objectified state, and then assimilates them back into him from outside. Hegel understands that the objects which appear to order men's lives — their religion, their wealth — in fact belong to man and are the product of essential human capacities. Nonetheless, Marx criticizes Hegel for equating labor with spiritual activity and alienation with objectivity. Marx believes Hegel's mistake is to make entities that belong objectively and sensuously to man into mental entities. For Hegel, the transcendence of alienation is the transcendence of the object — its reabsorption into the spiritual nature of man. In Hegel's system, the appropriation of alien things is only an abstract appropriation, which takes place in the realm of consciousness. While man suffers from economic and political alienation, it is only the thought of economics and politics that interests Hegel. Because Man's integration with nature takes place on a spiritual level, Marx views this integration as an abstraction and an illusion.

Marx holds that Feuerbach is the only one of Hegel's disciples who has truly conquered the master's philosophy. Feuerbach has succeeded in showing that Hegel, having started from the abstract, infinite point of view of religion and theology, then superseded this with the finite and particular attitude of philosophy, only to then supersede this attitude with a restoration of the abstraction typical of theology. Feuerbach sees this final stage as a regression, to which Marx agrees.

Hegel believes that reality is Spirit realizing itself, and that alienation consists in men's failure to understand that their environment and their culture are emanations of Spirit. Spirit's existence is constituted only in and through its own productive activity. In the process of realizing itself, Spirit produces a world that it initially believes is external, but gradually comes to understand is its own production. The aim of history is freedom, and freedom consists in men's becoming fully self-conscious.

Marx rejects Hegel's notion of Spirit, believing that man's mental activities — his ideas — are by themselves insufficient to explain social and cultural change. Marx comments that while Hegel talks as though human nature is only one attribute of self-consciousness, in reality self-consciousness is only one attribute of human nature. Hegel believes that man can be equated with self-consciousness, since self-consciousness has only itself for an object. Moreover, Hegel views alienation as constituted by objectivity and the overcoming of alienation as primarily the overcoming of objectivity. Against this, Marx argues that if man were merely self-consciousness then he could only establish outside himself abstract objects that have no independence vis-a-vis his self-consciousness. If all alienation is the alienation of self-consciousness, then actual alienation—alienation in relation to natural objects—is only apparent.

Marx instead sees man as an objective, natural being who has real natural objects that correspond to his nature. Marx calls his view "naturalism" and "humanism". He distinguishes this view from idealism and materialism, yet claims it unifies what is essentially true in both. For Marx, nature is that which is opposed to man, yet man is himself a part of the system of nature. Man's nature is constituted by his needs and drives, and it is through nature that these essential needs and drives are satisfied. As such, man needs objects that are independent of him to express his objective nature. A being that is neither an object itself nor has an object would be the only existing being—a non-objective abstraction.

Following this discussion of human nature, Marx comments on the last chapter of Hegel's Phenomenology. Marx criticizes Hegel for equating alienation with objectivity, and for claiming that consciousness has transcended alienation. According to Marx, Hegel holds that consciousness knows that its objects are its own self-alienation—that there is no distinction between the object of consciousness and consciousness itself. Alienation is transcended when man feels at one with the spiritual world in its alienated form, believing it to be a feature of his authentic existence. Marx differs fundamentally from Hegel on the meaning of "transcendence" (Aufhebung). While private property, morality, the family, civil society, the state, etc. have been "transcended" in thought, they remain in existence. Hegel has arrived at genuine insight into the process of alienation and its transcendence: atheism transcends God to produce theoretical humanism and communism transcends private property to produce practical humanism. However, in Marx's view, these attempts to arrive at humanism must themselves be transcended to generate a self-creating, positive humanism.

=== Needs, Production, the Division of Labor and Money ===
In the concluding portions of the Manuscripts, Marx reflects on the morality of private property and the meaning of money. This discussion is within the same framework as the first section on wages, rent and profit. Marx claims that private property artificially creates needs in order to bring men into dependence. As men and their needs are at the mercy of the market, poverty increases and men's living conditions become worse than those of animals. In line with this, political economy preaches utter asceticism and reduces the needs of the worker to the miserable necessities of life. Political economy has its own private laws, since alienation separates activities into different spheres, often with different and contradictory norms. Marx mentions that classical economists wish to limit the population and think even people a luxury. He then returns to the topic of communism. He claims that the situation in England provides a surer basis for the transcendence of alienation than that in Germany or France: the form of alienation in England is based in practical need, whereas German communism is based on an attempt to establish universal self-consciousness, and the equality of French communism has merely a political foundation.

Marx returns to the dehumanizing effects of capital in the second half of this section. He discusses the declining rate of interest and the abolition of land rent, as well as the question of the division of labor. In the next section on money, Marx quotes Shakespeare and Goethe to argue that money is the ruin of society. Since money could purchase anything, it could remedy all deficiencies. Marx believes that in a society where everything would have a definite, human value, only love could be exchanged for love, etc.

== Publication and reception ==
The Manuscripts were published for the first time in Moscow in 1932, as part of the Marx-Engels-Gesamtausgabe edition. They were edited by David Ryazanov under whom György Lukács worked in deciphering them. The immediate impact of their publication was tempered by the rise of Nazism in Germany in 1933, where the work might have had its greatest reception, and by the start of Stalin’s purges in Russia in 1934. However, Lukács would later claim that this experience transformed his interpretation of Marxism permanently. On publication, their importance was also recognized by Herbert Marcuse and Henri Lefebvre: Marcuse claimed that the Manuscripts demonstrated the philosophical foundations of Marxism, putting "the entire theory of 'scientific socialism' on a new footing"; Lefebvre, with Norbert Guterman, was the first to translate the Manuscripts into a foreign language, publishing a French edition in 1933. Lefebvre's Dialectical Materialism, written in 1934–5, advanced a reconstruction of Marx's entire body of work in the light of the Manuscripts. Copies of the published volumes of the Manuscripts subsequently became difficult to locate, as the Marx–Engels-Gesamtausgabe project was effectively cancelled shortly afterward.

The text became more widely disseminated after the Second World War, with satisfactory editions appearing in English only in 1956, and in French in 1962. In this period, Galvano Della Volpe was the first to translate and discuss the Manuscripts in Italian, propounding an interpretation that differed greatly from that of Lukács, Marcuse and Lefebvre and that inspired its own school of thought. Many Catholic writers, particularly those in France, took interest in the Manuscripts at this time. The existential Marxism of Maurice Merleau-Ponty and Jean-Paul Sartre also drew heavily from the Manuscripts. In the US, the Manuscripts were embraced enthusiastically in the late fifties and early sixties by the intellectual current subsequently known as the New Left, with a volume containing an introduction by Erich Fromm published in 1961.

Since the terminology of alienation does not appear in any prominent manner in Marx's magnum opus Capital, the publication of the Manuscripts caused great debate regarding the relationship of the "Young Marx" to the "Mature Marx". The Manuscripts were the most important reference for "Marxist humanism", which saw continuity between their Hegelian philosophical humanism and the economic theory of the later Marx. Conversely, the Soviet Union largely ignored the Manuscripts, believing them to belong to Marx's "early writings", which expound a line of thought that had led him nowhere. The structural Marxism of Louis Althusser inherited the Soviet Union's harsh verdict of Marx's early writings. Althusser believed there was a "break" in Marx's development — a break that divides Marx's thought into an "ideological" period before 1845, and a scientific period after. Others who ascribed a break to Marx idealized the Manuscripts and believed the young Marx to be the real Marx. Marxist economist Ernest Mandel distinguishes three different schools of thought with respect to this controversy:

(1) The position of those who try to deny that there is any difference between the Economic and Philosophic Manuscripts and Capital, and find the essentials of the theses of Capital already present in the Manuscripts.

(2) The position of those who consider that compared to the Marx of Capital, the Marx of the Manuscripts sets out in a more "total" and "integral" way the problem of alienated labor, especially by giving an ethical, anthropological, and even philosophical dimension to the idea; these people either contrast the two Marxs or else "re-evaluate" Capital in the light of the Manuscripts.

(3) The position of those who consider that the conceptions of the young Marx of the Manuscripts on alienated labor not only contradict the economic analysis of Capital but were an obstacle that made it difficult for the young Marx to accept the labor theory of value. For the extreme representatives of this school, the concept of alienation is a "pre-Marxist" concept which Marx had to overcome before he could arrive at a scientific analysis of capitalist economy.

— Ernest Mandel, The Formation of the Economic Thought of Karl Marx, p. 164

== See also ==
- Marx-Engels-Gesamtausgabe
- Young Marx
- Marxist aesthetics
- Marxist humanism
- History and Class Consciousness by György Lukács
- The Principle of Hope by Ernst Bloch
