= Mikhail Lifshitz =

Soviet academic (1905–1983)

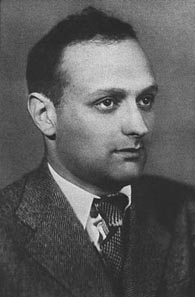
Lifshitz in the early 1930s

Mikhail Aleksandrovich Lifshitz (Russian: Михаи́л Алекса́ндрович Ли́фшиц; 23 July 1905 in Melitopol (Taurida Governorate, now Zaporizhzhia Oblast of Ukraine) – 20 September 1983 in Moscow) was a Soviet Marxian literary critic and philosopher of art who had a long and controversial career in the former Soviet Union.

In the 1930s, he strongly influenced Marxist views on aesthetics while being a close associate of György Lukács. He also published important compilations of early Marxist literature on the role of art. In 1975, he was elected as a full member of the USSR Academy of Arts.

== Biography ==
Born on 23 July 1905 in Melitopol, a city in Southern Ukraine, then part of Imperial Russia, Lifshitz began higher education as an art student at the Vkhutemas ("Higher Art and Technical Studios") in Moscow in the early 1920s, which was then the hotbed of Modernism.

He ended his studies there in 1925 because he disagreed with his modernist oriented instructors. Instead, he was offered a teaching position there; his job was to teach Marxist philosophy to artists.

He pursued an analysis of aesthetics from a fundamentally Marxist perspective. His ideas became controversial at Vkhutemas, so he had to leave in 1930. He was offered a job instead at the Moscow's Marx-Engels Institute, where he developed a working relationship with the great Marxist philosopher György Lukács. Lukacs, himself, admitted that he was influenced by Lifshitz' views on Marxist aesthetics.

Starting in 1933, he edited an influential Moscow magazine "The Literary Critic" (Literaturny Kritik), that was also followed by Marxist art theoreticians around the world through various translations published by Soviet government.

Among the important contributors was writer Andrei Platonov, one of the most intriguing writers of fiction of the Soviet period, who is often referred to as the Soviet Kafka, as well as György Lukács.

In 1938 Lifshitz's work "The Philosophy of Art of Karl Marx" was translated into English. His work also featured prominently in the influential work "Literature and Marxism: A Controversy by Soviet Critics" (1938). Lifshitz was considered a leading literary critic during the Stalin period.

Following the Nazi invasion of the Soviet Union Lifshitz entered the Second World War as a Red Army volunteer.

Early on, he saw some serious combat. His unit was surrounded by the German army, and he had to escape back through the front lines. Later on, he worked as a journalist in military publications. He received awards for his service.

=== Post-war career ===
His post-war career as a critic was marked by considerable controversy. In the last years of Stalin, as a Jew, he was attacked as part of the "campaign against Cosmopolitanism".

After Stalin's death in 1953, Lifshitz was in trouble again. A pamphlet he published in 1954, criticizing the writer Marietta Shaginyan, now displeased the old Stalinists, and provoked the ire of the established figures of Soviet intellectual life. He was severely criticized in the press and denied employment.

According to some sources, at that stage, he was expelled from the Communist Party. Yet he perhaps was merely severely sanctioned as a member, coming very close to expulsion.

His life improved after the official de-Stalinization started in 1956, and the sanctions against him were gradually lifted. Many of his works were published again.

The same time-frame was also a period of Lifshitz's collaboration with the Soviet philosopher Evald Ilyenkov.

=== Ilyenkov's philosophy ===
...resembled that of Lifschitz in one important (and now almost forgotten) realm: the relationship between philosophy, culture (art, literature, music and so on) and the 'communist ideal' of a new human being, formed as a result of the political-economic changes to come...

Lifshitz's main object of criticism in the 1960s was the modernist movement in the arts. From a political vantage point, Lifshitz, despite his criticism of the Soviet system, remained a strong proponent of Marxist-Leninist socialism.

In 1963 Lifshitz wrote the controversial article "Why Am I Not a Modernist?" where he defended Socialist Realism, which annoyed many modernists at the time. In 1968 it was included in his anthology "The Crisis of Ugliness" where he criticized Cubism and Pop-art.

In the early 1960s, Lifshitz gave considerable support to Aleksandr Solzhenitsyn, then a beginning writer:

When in 1961 Alexander Solzhenitsyn approached Alexander Tvardovsky about the publication of his now-famous One Day in Life of Ivan Denisovich ... Tvardovsky forwarded Solzhenitsyn's manuscript to one of his oldest and most trusted friends, Mikhail Lifschitz. Lifschitz's report was unequivocal: 'It would be a crime not to publish this work'.

Yet later Solzhenitsyn was not kind in his remarks about him.

Early on, Lifshitz was attacked in the mainstream Soviet press because of his criticisms of Modernist art; towards the end of his career he was honoured by the mainstream, and yet strongly disliked by the Soviet non-conformist artists.

Lifshitz died in Moscow on 28 September 1983, eight years after his election as a full member of the USSR Academy of Arts, the most prestigious academic artistic organization within the Soviet Union.

The vast majority of his work remains untranslated. One book on aesthetics, The Philosophy of Art of Karl Marx, was published in English translation in 1938, and republished in 1980.

Starting in the 1990s, Lifshitz acquired new popularity among the Nationalist circles in Russia, who appreciate his critique of "Western Modernist art", and his defence of traditional art. His works are being republished again.

== Contributions ==
Lifschitz's collection of Marx and Engels's views on aesthetics – Marx and Engels on Art was published in 1933 (also an extended edition of 1938) as the first anthology of its kind. It was also published in German in 1948.

In 1938, he published a similar anthology of Lenin's view on aesthetics called Lenin on Culture and Art.

In 1926–1940, Lifschitz also published a very large number of works dedicated to such diverse authorities as Giambattista Vico, Johann Joachim Winckelmann, Francesco Guicciardini, Balzac, Hegel, and Pushkin.

== Selected works (translations) ==
- The Crisis of Ugliness: From Cubism to Pop-Art, Mikhail Lifshitz. Translated and with an Introduction by David Riff. Leiden: BRILL, 2018 (originally published in Russian by Iskusstvo, 1968)
- The Philosophy of Art of Karl Marx. Longwood Publishing Group, 1980. (Original English translation of 1938); available also in the German translation (Lifschitz 1960), and the Spanish translation (Lifshits 1982)
- Marx / Engels. Über Kunst und Literatur. Eine Sammlung aus ihren Schriften. Henschel Verlag, Berlin 1948 (6. Auflage 1953). (German edition of Marx and Engels on Art anthology.)
- Mikhail Lifshitz, Literature and Marxism: A Controversy (1938)
