= Adolfo Sánchez Vázquez =

Philosopher and scholar (1915–2011)

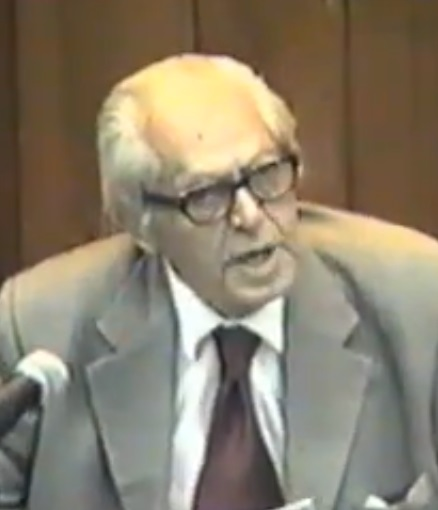
- Born: September 17, 1915; Algeciras, Andalucia
- Died: July 8, 2011 (aged 95)
- Awards: National Prize for Arts and Sciences; Grand Cross of the Civil Order of Alfonso X the Wise; Grand Cross of the Order of Civil Merit

Academic background
- Education: University of Madrid; National Autonomous University of Mexico
- Thesis: Filosofía de la praxis

Academic work
- Discipline: Philosophy
- Institutions: National Autonomous University of Mexico
- Main interests: Marxism
- Notable works: The Aesthetic Ideas of Marx

Adolfo Sánchez Vázquez (September 17, 1915 – July 8, 2011) was a Spanish-born Mexican philosopher, writer and professor born in Algeciras, Andalucia.

== Biography ==
In 1935 Sánchez started studying at the University of Madrid. Vázquez emigrated to Mexico in 1939 with thousands of other intellectuals, scientists and artists following the defeat of the Republic in the Spanish Civil War, in which he participated as editor of the central publication of the Juventudes Socialistas Unificadas (JSU) "Ahora".

Sánchez returned to Mexico City in 1943 where he continued his studies at the School of Philosophy and Letters of the UNAM, achieving a masters in Literature and Philosophy and a doctorate in philosophy. He was appointed a full-time professor of aesthetics and philosophy at the National Autonomous University of Mexico in 1959, becoming a professor emeritus of the university in 1985.

He embraced Marxism, although an open, renovating, critical and non-dogmatic version of it. His fresh interpretation of Marxism ran parallel to that of the Frankfurt School. In fact, The Philosophy of Praxis was published at around the same time as Herbert Marcuse was writing his One Dimensional Man. In regard to ethics, he opposed normativism.

In 2008 he published Incursiones literarias, a work of literary and artistic criticism.

He died in Mexico City on July 8, 2011, aged 95.

== Awards and recognition ==
In 1985, he received the 'Universidad Nacional' award by his alma mater the National Autonomous University of Mexico. he was also awarded the 'Gran cruz de Alfonso X, el Sabio' from the Spanish Ministry of Culture, 'Placa de Oro' from the provincial council of Cádiz and the recognition as 'Distinguished teacher of Mexico City' from the Government of Mexico City.

The Universidad Autónoma de Puebla and the Fundación de Investigaciones Marxistas of Madrid founded chairs named after him. A plaque was unveiled in his honor at the Colegio de Ciencias y Humanidades Plantel Sur in Mexico City and a street in Algeciras, Cádiz, has been named after him since 2000.

In 2002 was awarded the National Prize for Arts and Sciences in the History, Social Sciences, and Philosophy category.

Sánchez held honorary doctoral degrees from the Universidad Autónoma de Puebla (1985), the University of Cádiz (Spain, 1987), National University of Distance Education (Spain, 1993), Autonomous University of Nuevo León (1994), National Autonomous University of Mexico (1998) and Complutense University of Madrid (2000).

== Philosophical works ==
- The Aesthetic Ideas of Marx (1965)
- The Philosophy of Praxis (1967)
- Rousseau in Mexico (The Philosophy of Rousseau and the Ideology of Independence) (1969)
- Aesthetics and Marxism (1970)
- Anthology. Texts of Aesthetics and Theory of Art (1972)
- Art and Society: Essays in Marxist Aesthetics (1973)
- From Scientific Socialism to Utopian Socialism (1975).

== Other works ==
- Recollections and Reflections of an Exile (1997) – Memoirs
- Poetry (2005) – idem
- Incursiones literarias (2008) – Literary and artistic criticism.

== See also ==
- Western Marxism
