= Reification (Marxism) =

Treatment of social attributes as real, in Marxist theory

In Marxist philosophy, reification (Verdinglichung, "making into a thing") is the process by which human social relations are perceived as inherent attributes of the people involved in them, or attributes of some product of the relation, such as a traded commodity.

As a practice of economics, reification transforms objects into subjects and subjects into objects, with the result that subjects (people) are rendered passive (of determined identity), whilst objects (commodities) are rendered as the active factor that determines the nature of a social relation. Analogously, the term hypostatization describes an effect of reification that results from presuming the existence of any object that can be named and presuming the existence of an abstractly conceived object, which is a fallacy of reification of ontological and epistemological interpretation.

Reification is conceptually related to, but different from Marx's theory of alienation and theory of commodity fetishism; alienation is the general condition of human estrangement; reification is a specific form of alienation; and commodity fetishism is a specific form of reification.

== György Lukács ==
The concept of reification arose through the work of Lukács in his essay "Reification and the Consciousness of the Proletariat", collected in his book History and Class Consciousness (1923). Lukács treats reification as a problem of capitalist society that is related to the prevalence of the commodity form, through a close reading of "The Fetishism of the Commodity and its Secret" in the first volume of Capital (1867).

Those who have written about this concept include Max Stirner, Guy Debord, Raya Dunayevskaya, Raymond Williams, Timothy Bewes, Fredric Jameson, and Slavoj Žižek.

Marxist humanist Gajo Petrović (1965), drawing from Lukács, defines reification as:

The act (or result of the act) of transforming human properties, relations and actions into properties, relations and actions of man‑produced things which have become independent (and which are imagined as originally independent) of man and govern his life. Also transformation of human beings into thing‑like beings which do not behave in a human way but according to the laws of the thing‑world. Reification is a 'special' case of alienation, its most radical and widespread form characteristic of modern capitalist society.

Andrew Feenberg (1981) reinterprets Lukács's central category of "consciousness" as similar to anthropological notions of culture as a set of practices. The reification of consciousness in particular, therefore, is more than just an act of misrecognition; it affects the everyday social practice at a fundamental level beyond the individual subject.

== Frankfurt School ==
Lukács's account was influential for the philosophers of the Frankfurt School, for example in Horkheimer's and Adorno's Dialectic of Enlightenment, and in the works of Herbert Marcuse, and Axel Honneth.

Frankfurt School philosopher Axel Honneth (2008) reformulates this "Western Marxist" concept in terms of intersubjective relations of recognition and power. Instead of being an effect of the structural character of social systems such as capitalism, as Karl Marx and György Lukács argued, Honneth contends that all forms of reification are due to pathologies of intersubjectively based struggles for recognition.

== Social construction ==
Reification occurs when specifically human creations are misconceived as "facts of nature, results of cosmic laws, or manifestations of divine will." However, some scholarship on Lukács's (1923) use of the term "reification" in History and Class Consciousness has challenged this interpretation of the concept, according to which reification implies that a pre-existing subject creates an objective social world from which it is then alienated.

== Phenomenology ==
Other scholarship has suggested that Lukács's use of the term may have been strongly influenced by Edmund Husserl's phenomenology to understand his preoccupation with the reification of consciousness in particular. On this reading, reification entails a stance that separates the subject from the objective world, creating a mistaken relation between subject and object that is reduced to disengaged knowing. Applied to the social world, this leaves individual subjects feeling that society is something they can only know as an alien power, rather than interact with. In this respect, Lukács's use of the term could be seen as prefiguring some of the themes Martin Heidegger (1927) touches on in Being and Time, supporting the suggestion of Lucien Goldman (2009) that Lukács and Heidegger were much closer in their philosophical concerns than typically thought.

== Louis Althusser ==
French philosopher Louis Althusser criticized what he called the "ideology of reification" that sees "'things' everywhere in human relations."

== See also ==
- Caste – Social stratification conferring status
- Character mask
- Commodity fetishism – Concept in Marxist analysis
- Hauntology – Return or persistence of past ideas
- Hypostatic abstraction – Formal operation in mathematical logic
- Immanentize the eschaton – Pejorative term for attempts to bring about utopian conditions
- Marx's theory of alienation – Social theory developed by Karl Marx
- Objectification – Treating persons as objects
- Reification (fallacy) – Fallacy of treating an abstraction as if it were a real thing
- The Secret of Hegel – Book by James Hutchison Stirling
