= The Young Hegel =

Book by Marxist philosopher György Lukács on the early life and writings of Hegel

- Cover of the 1948 edition
- Author: György Lukács
- Original title: Der junge Hegel
- Language: German
- Subject: Georg Wilhelm Friedrich Hegel
- Published: 1948
- Publication place: Switzerland
- Media type: Print

The Young Hegel (German: Der junge Hegel: Über die Beziehungen von Dialektik und Ökonomie) is a book about the philosophical development of Georg Wilhelm Friedrich Hegel by the philosopher György Lukács. The work was completed in 1938 and published in Zurich in 1948.

The book challenged many conventional readings of Hegel as a Conservative Idealist. He claims Hegel was less concerned with escapism than socioeconomic analysis. Lukacs discounts the metaphysical side of Hegel, and insists he was influenced by the materialism and anti-Christian secularism of the Enlightenment. Lukacs claims that Hegel was a Young Jacobin Radical and saw the radical direct democracy of the Greek polis as a model to emulate.

== Overview ==
While previously active within the politics of the Hungarian Communist Party, after the defeat of his line Lukács took less of a role in active politics and retreated into more academic analysis of dialectical materialism. István Mészáros sees Lukacs's emphasis on Hegel's Jacobinism as a veiled critique of the official Stalinist line which claimed that Hegel represented an aristocratic reaction to the French Revolution.

In pre-figuring Marx, Lukacs sees Hegel as turning to the same sources of British Political Economy and the Scottish Enlightenment that would influence the young Marx. In particular he emphasizes the force of Adam Smith and James Steuart in shaping Hegel's economic views and his critique of alienation in the division of labor.

Lukacs would also present a Marxist reading of the master-servant dialectic.

But despite all that the advance of consciousness goes through the mind of the servant and not that of his master. In the dialectics of labour real self-consciousness is brought into being, the phenomenological agent that dissolves antiquity. The 'configurations of consciousness' which arise in the course of this dissolution: scepticism, stoicism and the unhappy consciousness (primitive Christianity) without exception the products of the dialectics of servile consciousness.

Lukacs's portrait of a progressive, sociological and materialist Hegel has been criticized by some Marxists for dulling the dividing line between Hegel and Marx.
