= Soul and Form =

Collection of essays by Georg Lukács

- Cover of the 1911 edition
- Author: György Lukács
- Original title: Die Seele und die Formen
- Translator: Anna Bostock
- Language: Hungarian
- Subject: Literary criticism
- Published: 1908 (in Hungarian); 1911 (Egon Fleischel & Co (Berlin), in German)
- Publication place: Hungary
- Media type: Print
- ISBN: 0231149816

Soul and Form (German: Die Seele und die Formen) is a collection of essays in literary criticism by Georg Lukács. It was first published in Hungarian in 1908, then later republished in German with additional essays in 1911. Alongside The Theory of the Novel (1916) it is one of his most famous pre-Marxist critical works. The Brazilian Marxist intellectual Michael Löwy has described it as a text of 'pre-Marxist Romantic anti-capitalism'. The collection primarily features essays on individual writers or philosophers, including Laurence Sterne, Richard Beer-Hofmann, Paul Ernst, Søren Kierkegaard, Theodor Storm, Novalis, Rudolf Kassner, Stefan George and Charles-Louis Philippe.

== Summary ==
The introductory essay to the collection presents a theory of the essay form itself. Lukács argues that essayistic literary criticism does not fit easily into either category of scientific or artistic work. He sees the role of the critic as a Platonist who explores the metaphysical possibilities of art forms by philosophically interpreting artistic works. In doing this, critics can contribute to the creation of a Weltanschauung which both artists and audiences share in common, and which furthers the transcendental significance of modern art forms.

The most famous essay regards Søren Kierkegaard's breaking off his engagement to Regine Olsen. Lukacs reads it as metaphoric for the sacrifice of life that the author makes. And the angst of existential commitment would play a role in the development of existentialist Marxism.

Regine Olsen, the concrete, living, fleshly person, thus becomes a character in the aesthetic romance of Kierkegaard.

Ágnes Heller reads Lukacs as seeing Kierkegaard as sacrificing the actuality of love for the shape of form. Kierkegaard has presented the Seducer who uses and exploits women as the villain. But Lukacs interprets the rejection of Regine Olsen, as a living character with her own subjectivity, as the similar exploitation by the existential aesthetic. From both himself and Regine, Kierkegaard take away the possibility of living a conventional normal life. While Regine, would later enter into a conventional bourgeois marriage, she would always exist as an existential form in the writings of Soren. As a founder of Christian existentialism, Kierkegaard needs to sacrifice the love which is most dear to him the altar of the Cross. It is from this rejection of the conventional bourgeois life, and the comfortable happiness and fulfillment it offers, that Lukacs sees as the origin of Kierkegaard's existential angst. Lukacs recognized in this dilemma, the tragedy of his own rejection of 'life' with Irma Seidler, in preference for work over life.
