= Realism in the Balance =

"Realism in the Balance" (German: Es geht um den Realismus) is a 1938 essay by Georg Lukács written while he lived in Soviet Russia and first published in a German literary journal. In it, he defends the "traditional" realism of authors like Thomas Mann in the face of rising Modernist movements, such as Expressionism, Surrealism, and Naturalism. Practitioners of these movements, such as James Joyce, emphasise the discord and disenchantment of modern life through techniques that highlight individualism and individual consciousness, such as stream of consciousness. Lukács presents a nuanced view of how these movements relate to what he regards as "true" realism. On the one hand, Lukács argues that Modernist movements are historically necessary, but he is convinced they lack revolutionary power.

== Themes ==
=== The new movements in context ===
Lukács felt that the new movements evidenced that capitalism was stretched to breaking point. He writes:

Economic reality as a totality is itself subject to historical change ... the decisive role of the bourgeoisie in history is to develop the world market, thanks to which the economy of the whole world becomes an objectively unified totality. ... As a result of the objective structure of the economic system, the surface of capitalism appears to ‘disintegrate’ into a series of elements all driven towards independence. Obviously this must be reflected in the consciousness of the men who live in this society, and hence too in the consciousness of poets and thinkers. (1036)

That is to say, the focus on individual isolation in these artistic movements correlated directly with the wholesale integration of the capitalist system. This forms one of Lukács' primary arguments against the revolutionary potential of modernism, namely, that these movements portray individual life as disconnected at a time in which capitalism ensures that people's lives are actually more intertwined than ever.

=== Social totality ===
Lukács believed strongly that literature could affect society. Indeed, "Realism in the Balance" begins by quoting Georgi Dimitrov on the importance of Don Quixote to the middle class in their battle against feudalism. And it was traditional realism that Lukács believed could lead to Marxist revolution.

Lukács takes the Marxist stance that those in the working class are a restless force, full of potential but lacking direction. It is the duty of the author, then, to make evident to the working class the true nature of social relations. To Lukács, then, the struggle over the nature of "realism" was not an obscure theoretical squabble but a debate of importance that had phenomenal potential to change society. As he writes:

If literature is a particular form by means of which objective reality is reflected, then it becomes of crucial importance for it to grasp that reality as it truly is, and not merely to confine itself to reproducing whatever manifests itself immediately and on the surface. (1037)

"Whatever manifests itself immediately and on the surface" here is a clear jab at the techniques and perspectives of the Modernist schools.

=== Realism and great literature ===
Lukács believed that those authors willing to try and capture this social totality produced better works, both in aesthetics and in revolutionary potential, than the writers of the Modernist schools. Cleverly paralleling the dialectical developments of larger society, Lukács writes that the "monotony" of Modernist works proceeds inexorably from the decision to abandon any attempt to mirror objective reality ... this approach permits no creative composition, no rise and fall, no growth from within to emerge from the true nature of the subject-matter.

In particular, Lukács expresses his support for the German author Thomas Mann. Citing the title character of Mann's work Tonio Kröger, Lukács writes that:

when Thomas Mann refers to Tonio Kröger as a "bourgeois who has lost his way", he does not rest content with that: he shows how and why he is still a bourgeois, for all his hostility to the bourgeoisie, his homelessness within bourgeois society, and his exclusion from the life of the bourgeois. Because he does all this, Mann towers as a creative artist and in his grasp of the nature of society. (1039-1040)

But Lukács did not only prize the work of leftists. He felt that any author, regardless of political affiliation, would be better served by displaying the "real" nature of social totality. This explains Lukács' support of the works of Balzac, who, as a royalist, was diametrically opposed to Lukács' Leninist beliefs.

=== Historical materialism ===
Lukács refuses to grant any revolutionary potential to the new Modernist schools, but in doing so, he is forced to defend his thesis in a controversial way. Marxist thought holds that each new advance in society merely hastens the eventual revolution. But certainly the Modernist schools are a new advance, and so they must have some revolutionary potential. Lukács is therefore forced to either declare that Modernism is not historically necessary, or to debate the Marxist concept of inevitability. Since he has already incorporated the development of Modernist movements into his thesis of social totality, he must take the latter position. As he writes:

For Marxism the acknowledgment of a historical necessity neither implies a justification of what actually exists (not even during the period when it exists), nor does it express a fatalistic belief in the necessity of historical events ... Even less would it occur to a Marxist to see thereby any fatalistic necessity in the development from capitalism to socialism. (1047)

== Synopsis ==
The initial intent of "Realism in the Balance" is to debunk the claims of those defending Expressionism as a valuable literary movement. Lukács addresses the discordance in the community of modernist critics, whom he regarded as incapable of deciding which writers were Expressionist and which were not, arguing that "perhaps there is no such thing as an Expressionist writer".

Although his aim is ostensibly to criticise the over-valuation of modernist schools of writing at the time the article was published, Lukács uses the essay to advance his formulation of the desirable alternative to these schools. He rejects the notion that modern art must necessarily manifest itself as a litany of sequential movements, beginning with Naturalism, and proceeding through Impressionism and Expressionism to culminate in Surrealism. For Lukács, the important issue at stake was not the conflict that results from the modernists' evolving oppositions to classical forms, but rather the ability of art to confront the world's objective reality, an ability he found almost entirely lacking in modernism.

Lukács believed that desirable alternative to such modernism must therefore take the form of Realism, and he enlists the realist authors Maxim Gorky, Thomas and Heinrich Mann, and Romain Rolland to champion his cause. To frame the debate, Lukács introduces the arguments of critic Ernst Bloch, a defender of Expressionism, and the author to whom Lukács was chiefly responding. He maintains that modernists such as Bloch are too willing to ignore the realist tradition, an ignorance that he believes derives from a modernist rejection of a tenet of Marxist theory, a rejection which he quotes Bloch as propounding. This tenet is that the system of capitalism is "an objective totality of social relations," and is fundamental to Lukács's arguments in favour of realism.

He explains that the pervasiveness of capitalism, the unity in its economic and ideological theory, and its profound influence on social relations comprise a "closed integration" or "totality," an objective whole that functions independent of human consciousness. Lukács cites Marx to bolster this historical materialist worldview: "The relations of production in every society form a whole." He further cites Marx to argue that the bourgeoisie's unabated developing of the world's markets is so far-reaching as to create a unified totality. However, he explains that society perceives the increasing autonomy of capitalist elements (such as the autonomy of currency) as a "crisis." But because of this, there must be an underlying unity binding these apparently autonomous elements, which makes their separation appear as crisis.

Returning to modernist forms, Lukács stipulates that such theories disregard the relationship of literature to objective reality, in favour of the portrayal of subjective experience and immediacy that do little to evince the underlying capitalist totality of existence. It is clear that Lukács regards the representation of reality as art's chief purpose—in this he is perhaps not in disagreement with the modernists—but he maintains that "If a writer strives to represent reality as it truly is, i.e. if he is an authentic realist, then the question of totality plays a decisive role." "True realists" demonstrate the importance of the social context, and since the unmasking of this objective totality is a crucial element in Lukács's Marxist ideology, he privileges their authorial approach.

Lukács then sets up a dialectical opposition between two elements he believes inherent to human experience. He maintains that this dialectical relation exists between the "appearance" of events as subjective, unfettered experiences and their "essence" as provoked by the objective totality of capitalism. Lukács explains that good realists, such as Thomas Mann, create a contrast between the consciousnesses of their characters (appearance) and a reality independent of them (essence). According to Lukács, Mann succeeds because he creates this contrast. Conversely, modernist writers fail because they portray reality only as it appears to themselves and their characters—subjectively—and "fail to pierce the surface" of these immediate, subjective experiences "to discover the underlying essence, i.e. the real factors that relate their experiences to the hidden social forces that produce them." The pitfalls of relying on immediacy are manifold, according to Lukács. Because the prejudices inculcated by the capitalist system are so insidious, they cannot be escaped without the abandonment of subjective experience and immediacy in the literary sphere. They can only be superseded by realist authors who "abandon and transcend the limits of immediacy, by scrutinising all subjective experiences and measuring them against social reality;" this is no easy task. Lukács relies on Hegelian dialectics to explain how the relationship between this immediacy and abstraction effects a subtle indoctrination on the part of capitalist totality. The circulation of money, he explains, as well as other elements of capitalism, is entirely abstracted away from its place in the broader capitalist system, and therefore appears as a subjective immediacy, which elides its position as a crucial element of objective totality.

Although abstraction can lead to the concealment of objective reality, it is necessary for art, and Lukács believes that realist authors can successfully employ it "to penetrate the laws governing objective reality, and to uncover the deeper, hidden, mediated, not immediately perceptible of relationships that go to make up society." After a great deal of intellectual effort, Lukács claims a successful realist can discover these objective relationships and give them artistic shape in the form of a character's subjective experience. Then, by employing the technique of abstraction, the author can portray the character's experience of objective reality as the same kind of subjective, immediate experience that characterise totality's influence on non-fictional individuals. The best realists, he claims, "depict the vital, but not immediately obvious forces at work in objective reality." They do so with such profundity and truth that the products of their imagination can potentially receive confirmation from subsequent historical events. The true masterpieces of realism can be appreciated as "wholes" which depict a wide-ranging and exhaustive objective reality like the one that exists in the non-fictional world.

After advancing his formulation of a desirable literary school, a realism that depicts objective reality, Lukács turns once again to the proponents of modernism. Citing Nietzsche, who argues that "the mark of every form of literary decadence ... is that life no longer dwells in the totality," Lukács strives to debunk modernist portrayals, claiming they reflect not on objective reality, but instead proceed from subjectivity to create a "home-made model of the contemporary world." The abstraction (and immediacy) inherent in modernism portrays "essences" of capitalist domination divorced from their context, in a way that takes each essence in "isolation," rather than taking into account the objective totality that is the foundation for all of them. Lukács believes that the "social mission of literature" is to clarify the experience of the masses, and in turn show these masses that their experiences are influenced by the objective totality of capitalism, and his chief criticism of modernist schools of literature is that they fail to live up to this goal, instead proceeding inexorably towards more immediate, more subjective, more abstracted versions of fictional reality that ignore the objective reality of the capitalist system. Realism, because it creates apparently subjective experiences that demonstrate the essential social realities that provoke them, is for Lukács the only defensible or valuable literary school of the early twentieth century.
