= György Lukács =

Hungarian philosopher and critic (1885–1971)

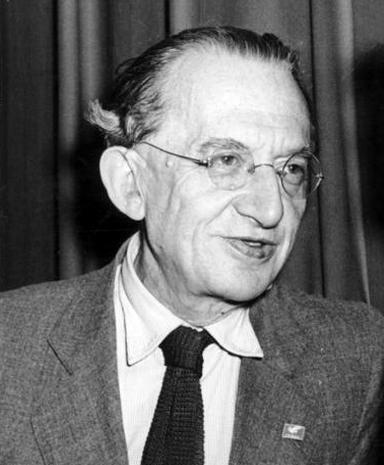
- Lukács in 1952
- Born: Bernát György Löwinger; 13 April 1885; Budapest, Austria-Hungary
- Died: 4 June 1971 (aged 86); Budapest, Hungarian People's Republic
- Political party: Hungarian Communist Party
- Spouses: Jelena Grabenko; Gertrúd Jánosi (née Bortstieber)
- Awards: Order of the Red Banner (1969)

Education
- Education: Royal Hungarian University of Kolozsvár (Dr. rer. oec.); University of Berlin; University of Budapest (PhD)
- Thesis: A drámaírás főbb irányai a múlt század utolsó negyedében (The Main Directions of Drama-Writing in the Last Quarter of the Past Century) (1909)
- Doctoral advisor: Zsolt Beöthy (PhD advisor)
- Other advisor: Georg Simmel

Philosophical work
- Era: 20th-century philosophy
- Region: Western philosophy
- School: Continental philosophy Neo-Kantianism (1906–1918); Western Marxism / Hegelian Marxism (after 1918); Budapest School
- Institutions: University of Budapest
- Doctoral students: Ágnes Heller; István Mészáros
- Notable students: György Márkus
- Main interests: Political philosophy, social theory, literary theory, aesthetics, Marxist humanism
- Notable ideas: Reification, class consciousness, transcendental homelessness, the genre of tragedy as an ethical category

György Lukács (Note: UK: /ˈluːkætʃ/, US also /-kɑːtʃ/; Hungarian: [ˈɟørɟ ˈlukaːtʃ]) (born Bernát György Löwinger; (Note: Hungarian: [ˈbɛrnaːt ˈɟørɟ ˈløviŋɡɛr]) Hungarian: Lukács György; German: Georg Bernard Lukács; (Note: German: [ˈluːkatʃ]) 13 April 1885 – 4 June 1971) was a Hungarian Marxist philosopher, literary historian, literary critic, and aesthetician. He was one of the founders of Western Marxism, an interpretive tradition that departed from the Soviet Marxist ideological orthodoxy. He developed the theory of reification, and contributed to Marxist theory with developments of Karl Marx's theory of class consciousness. He was also a philosopher of Leninism. He ideologically developed and organised Vladimir Lenin's pragmatic revolutionary practices into the formal philosophy of vanguard-party revolution.

Lukács was especially influential as a critic due to his theoretical developments of literary realism and of the novel as a literary genre. In 1919, he was appointed the Hungarian Minister of Culture of the government of the short-lived Hungarian Soviet Republic (March–August 1919). Lukács has been described as the preeminent Marxist intellectual of the Stalinist era, though assessing his legacy can be difficult as Lukács seemed both to support Stalinism as the embodiment of Marxist thought, and yet also to champion a return to pre-Stalinist Marxism.

== Life and politics ==
Lukács was born Bernát György Löwinger in Budapest, Austria-Hungary, to the investment banker József Löwinger (later: szegedi Lukács József; 1855–1928) and his wife Adele Wertheimer (Wertheimer Adél; 1860–1917), who were a wealthy Jewish family. He had a brother and sister. He and his family converted to Lutheranism in 1907.

His father was knighted by the empire and received a baronial title, making Lukács a baron as well through inheritance. As a writer, he published under the names Georg Lukács and György Lukács. Lukács participated in intellectual circles in Budapest, Berlin, Florence and Heidelberg. He received his doctorate in economic and political sciences (Dr. rer. oec.) in 1906 from the Royal Hungarian University of Kolozsvár. In 1909, he completed his doctorate in philosophy at the University of Budapest under the direction of Zsolt Beöthy.

=== Pre-Marxist period ===
Whilst at university in Budapest, Lukács was part of socialist intellectual circles through which he met Ervin Szabó, an anarcho-syndicalist who introduced him to the works of Georges Sorel (1847–1922), the French proponent of revolutionary syndicalism. In that period, Lukács's intellectual perspectives were modernist and antipositivist. From 1904 to 1908, he was part of a theatre troupe that produced modernist, psychologically realistic plays by Henrik Ibsen, August Strindberg, and Gerhart Hauptmann.

Between 1906 and 1909 while in his early twenties, he worked on his 1,000 page A modern dráma fejlődésének története (English: History of the Development of the Modern Drama). It was published in Hungary in 1911. He was dismayed when it won a prize in 1908 because he did not think the jury was fit to judge it.

Lukács spent much time in Germany, and studied at the University of Berlin from 1906 to 1907, during which time he made the acquaintance of the philosopher Georg Simmel. Later in 1913 whilst in Heidelberg, he befriended Max Weber, Emil Lask, Ernst Bloch, and Stefan George. The idealist system to which Lukács subscribed at this time was intellectually indebted to neo-Kantianism (then the dominant philosophy in German universities) and to Plato, Georg Wilhelm Friedrich Hegel, Søren Kierkegaard, Wilhelm Dilthey, and Fyodor Dostoevsky. In that period, he published Soul and Form (Die Seele und die Formen, Berlin, 1911; tr. 1974) and The Theory of the Novel (1916/1920; tr. 1971).

After the beginning of the First World War, Lukács was exempted from military service. In 1914, he married the Russian political activist Jelena Grabenko.

In 1915, Lukács returned to Budapest, where he was the leader of the "Sunday Circle", an intellectual salon. Its concerns were the cultural themes that arose from the existential works of Dostoyevsky, which thematically aligned with Lukács's interests in his last years at Heidelberg. As a salon, the Sunday Circle sponsored cultural events whose participants included literary and musical avant-garde figures, such as Karl Mannheim, the composer Béla Bartók, Béla Balázs, Arnold Hauser, Zoltán Kodály and Karl Polanyi; some of them also attended the weekly salons. In 1918, the last year of the First World War (1914–1918), the Sunday Circle became divided. They dissolved the salon because of their divergent politics; several of the leading members accompanied Lukács into the Communist Party of Hungary.

=== Pivot to communism ===
In the aftermath of the First World War and the Russian Revolution of 1917, Lukács rethought his ideas. He became a committed Marxist in this period and joined the fledgling Communist Party of Hungary in 1918. Up until at least September 1918, he had intended to emigrate to Germany, but after being rejected from a habilitation in Heidelberg, he wrote on 16 December that he had already decided to pursue a political career in Hungary instead. Lukács later wrote that he was persuaded to this course by Béla Kun. The last publication of Lukács' pre-Marxist period was "Bolshevism as a Moral Problem", a rejection of Bolshevism on ethical grounds that he apparently reversed within days.

=== Communist leader ===
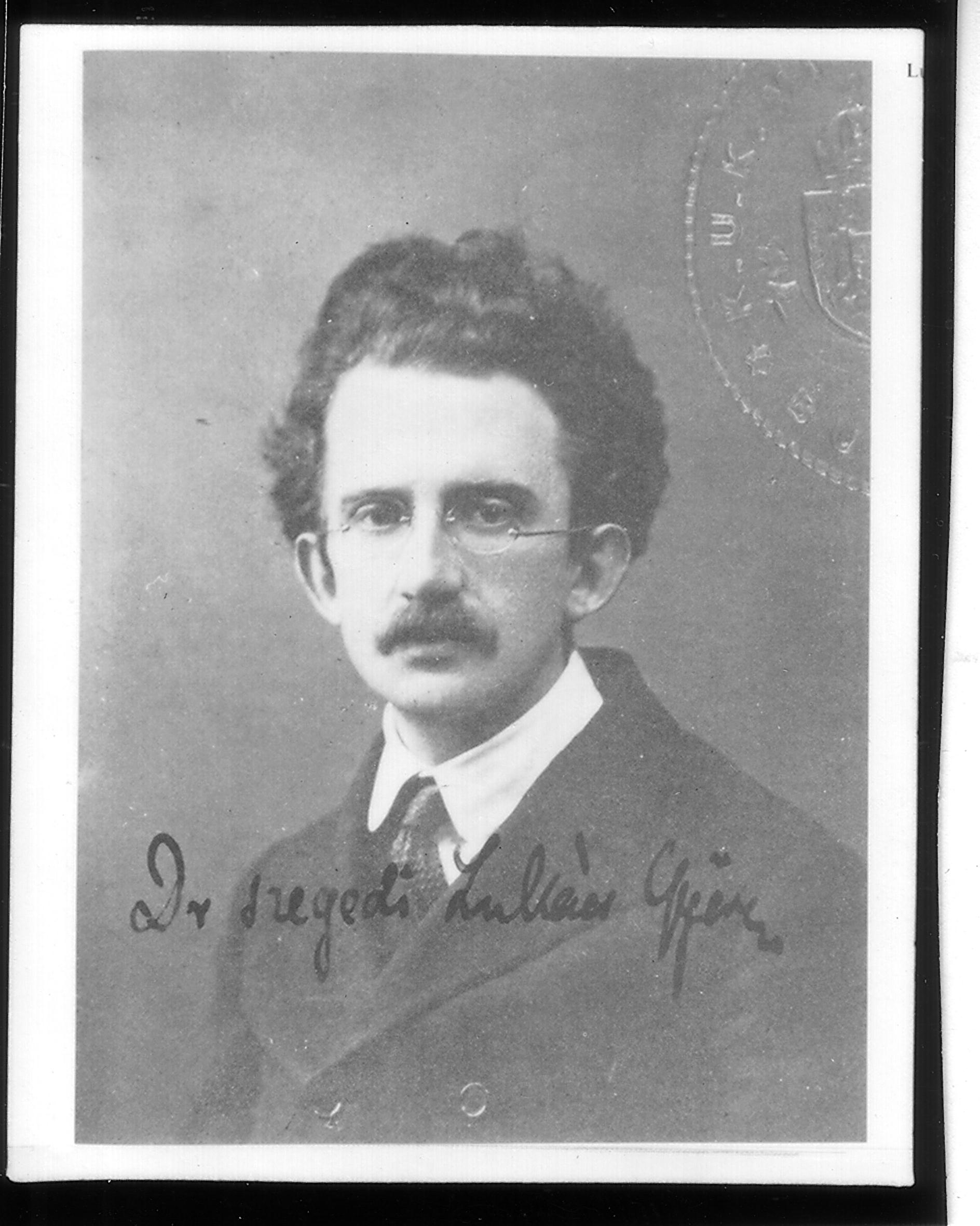
György Lukács in 1917

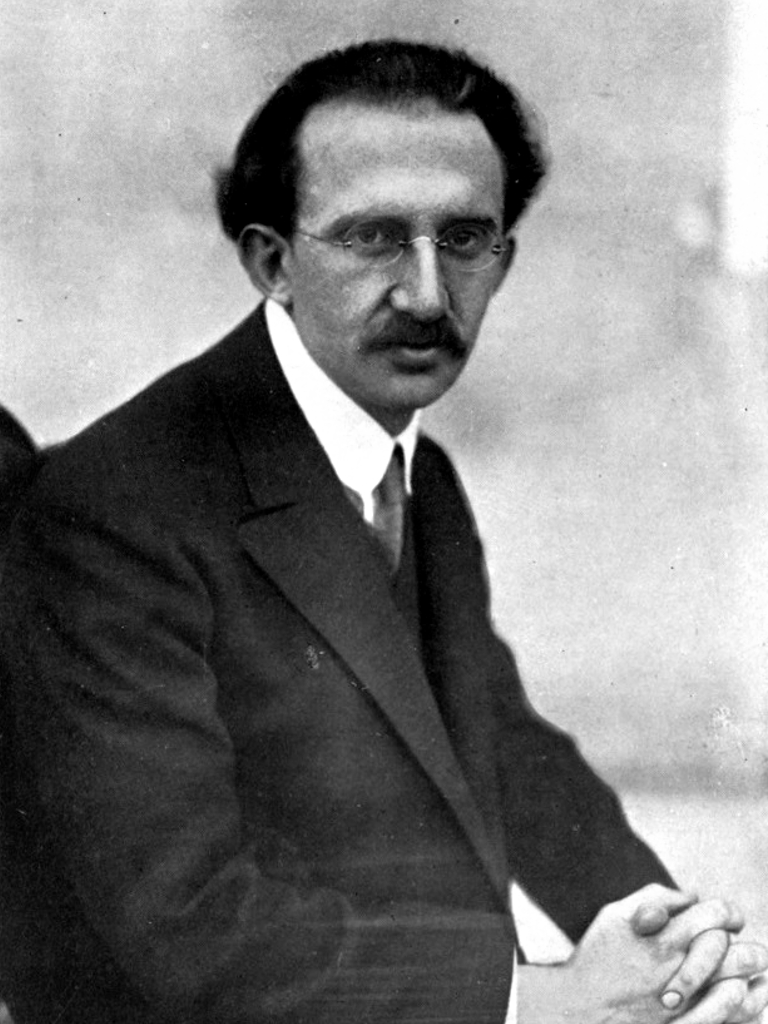
Lukács in 1919

As part of the government of the short-lived Hungarian Soviet Republic, Lukács was made People's Commissar for Education and Culture (he was deputy to the Commissar for Education Zsigmond Kunfi).

It is said by József Nádass that Lukács was giving a lecture entitled "Old Culture and New Culture" to a packed hall when the republic was proclaimed, which was interrupted due to the revolution.

During the Hungarian Soviet Republic, Lukács was a theoretician of the Hungarian version of the Red Terror. In an article in the Népszava, 15 April 1919, he wrote that "The possession of the power of the state is also a moment for the destruction of the oppressing classes. A moment, we have to use". Lukács later became a commissar of the Fifth Division of the Hungarian Red Army, in which capacity he ordered the execution of eight of his own soldiers in Poroszló, in May 1919, which he later admitted in an interview.

After the Hungarian Soviet Republic was defeated, Lukács was ordered by Kun to remain behind with Ottó Korvin, when the rest of the leadership evacuated. Lukács and Korvin's mission was to clandestinely reorganize the communist movement, but this proved to be impossible. Lukács went into hiding, with the help of photographer Olga Máté. After Korvin's capture in 1919, Lukács fled from Hungary to Vienna. He was arrested but was saved from extradition due to a group of writers including Thomas and Heinrich Mann. Thomas Mann later based the character Naphta on Lukács in his novel The Magic Mountain.

He married his second wife, Gertrúd Bortstieber in 1919 in Vienna, a fellow member of the Hungarian Communist Party.

Around the 1920s, while Antonio Gramsci was also in Vienna, though they did not meet each other, Lukács met a fellow communist, Victor Serge, and began to develop Leninist ideas in the field of philosophy. His major works in this period were the essays collected in his magnum opus History and Class Consciousness (Geschichte und Klassenbewußtsein, Berlin, 1923). Although these essays display signs (Note: Lenin made his view known in a review he gave of Lukács' work: "Its Marxism is purely verbal; its distinction between defensive and offensive tactics is artificial; it gives no concrete analysis of precise and definite historical situations; it takes no account of what is most essential (the need to take over, and learn to take over, all fields of work and all institutions in which the bourgeoisie exercises its influence over the masses, etc.)") of what Vladimir Lenin referred to as "left communism" (with later Leninists calling it "ultra-leftism"), they provided Leninism with a substantive philosophical basis. In July 1924, Grigory Zinoviev attacked this book along with the work of Karl Korsch at the Fifth Comintern Congress.

In 1925, shortly after Lenin's death, Lukács published in Vienna the short study Lenin: A Study in the Unity of His Thought (Lenin: Studie über den Zusammenhang seiner Gedanken). In 1925, he published a critical review of Nikolai Bukharin's manual of historical materialism.

As a Hungarian exile, he remained active on the left wing of the Hungarian Communist Party, and was opposed to the Moscow-backed programme of Béla Kun. His "Blum theses" of 1928 called for the overthrow of the counter-revolutionary regime of Admiral Horthy in Hungary by a strategy similar to the Popular Fronts that arose in the 1930s. He advocated a "democratic dictatorship" of the proletariat and peasantry as a transitional stage leading to the dictatorship of the proletariat. After Lukács's strategy was condemned by the Comintern, he retreated from active politics into theoretical work.

Lukács left Vienna in 1929, first for Berlin, then for Budapest.

=== Under Stalin and Rákosi ===
In 1930, while residing in Budapest, Lukács was summoned to Moscow. This coincided with the signing of a Viennese police order for his expulsion. Leaving their children to attend their studies, Lukács and his wife went to Moscow in March 1930. Soon after his arrival, Lukács was "prevented" from leaving and assigned to work alongside David Riazanov ("in the basement") at the Marx–Engels Institute.

Lukács returned to Berlin in 1931 and in 1933 he once again left Berlin for Moscow to attend the Institute of Philosophy of the Russian Academy of Sciences. During this time, Lukács first came into contact with the unpublished works of the young Marx.

Lukács survived the purges of the Great Terror, but he and his wife were not permitted to leave the Soviet Union until after the Second World War. Shortly after the German invasion of the Soviet Union, on June 29, 1941 Lukács was arrested by the NKVD, but released on August 26. He was then evacuated to Tashkent with a group of German-speaking writers, where he and Johannes Becher became friends. There is much debate among historians concerning the extent to which Lukács accepted Stalinism at this period.

In 1945, Lukács and his wife returned to Hungary. As a member of the Hungarian Communist Party, he took part in establishing the new Hungarian government. From 1945 Lukács was a member of the Hungarian Academy of Sciences. Between 1945 and 1946, he strongly criticised non-communist philosophers and writers. Lukács has been accused of playing an "administrative" (legal-bureaucratic) role in the removal of independent and non-communist intellectuals such as Béla Hamvas, István Bibó, Lajos Prohászka, and Károly Kerényi from Hungarian academic life. Between 1946 and 1953, many non-communist intellectuals, including Bibó, were imprisoned or forced into menial work or manual labour.

Lukács's personal aesthetic and political positions on culture were always that socialist culture would eventually triumph in terms of quality. He thought it should play out in terms of competing cultures, not by "administrative" measures. In 1948–49, Lukács's position for cultural tolerance was smashed in a "Lukács purge", when Mátyás Rákosi turned his famous salami tactics on the Hungarian Working People's Party.

In the mid-1950s, Lukács was reintegrated into party life. The party used him to help purge the Hungarian Writers' Union in 1955–1956. Tamás Aczél and Tibor Méray (former Secretaries of the Hungarian Writers' Union) both believe that Lukács participated grudgingly, and cite Lukács's leaving the presidium and the meeting at the first break as evidence of this reluctance.

=== De-Stalinisation ===
In 1956, Lukács became a minister of the brief communist revolutionary government led by Imre Nagy, which opposed the Soviet Union. At this time, Lukács's daughter led a short-lived party of communist revolutionary youth. Lukács's position on the 1956 revolution was that the Hungarian Communist Party would need to retreat into a coalition government of socialists and slowly rebuild its credibility with the Hungarian people. While a minister in Nagy's revolutionary government, Lukács also participated in trying to reform the Hungarian Communist Party on a new basis. This party, the Hungarian Socialist Workers' Party, was rapidly co-opted by János Kádár after 4 November 1956.

During the 1956 Hungarian Revolution, Lukács was present at debates of the anti-party and revolutionary communist Petőfi Society while remaining part of the party apparatus. During the revolution, as mentioned in Budapest Diary, Lukács argued for a new Soviet-aligned communist party. In Lukács's view, the new party could win social leadership only by persuasion instead of force. Lukács envisioned an alliance between the dissident communist Hungarian Revolutionary Youth Party, the revolutionary Hungarian Social Democratic Party and his own Soviet-aligned party as a very junior partner.

Following the defeat of the Revolution, Lukács was deported to the Socialist Republic of Romania with the rest of Nagy's government. Unlike Nagy, he avoided execution, albeit narrowly. Due to his role in Nagy's government, he was no longer trusted by the party apparatus. Lukács's followers were indicted for political crimes throughout the 1960s and '70s, and a number fled to the West. Lukács's books The Young Hegel (Der junge Hegel, Zurich, 1948) and The Destruction of Reason (Die Zerstörung der Vernunft, Berlin, 1954) have been used to argue that Lukács was covertly critical of Stalinism as a distortion of Marxism. In this reading, these two works are attempts to reconcile the idealism of Hegelian-dialectics with the dialectical materialism of Marx and Engels, and position Stalinism as a philosophy of irrationalism.

He returned to Budapest in 1957. Lukács publicly abandoned his positions of 1956 and engaged in self-criticism. Having abandoned his earlier positions, Lukács remained loyal to the Communist Party until his death in 1971. In his last years, following the uprisings in France and Czechoslovakia in 1968, Lukács became more publicly critical of the Soviet Union and the Hungarian Communist Party.

In an interview just before his death, Lukács remarked:

Without a genuine general theory of society and its movement, one does not get away from Stalinism. Stalin was a great tactician... But Stalin, unfortunately, was not a Marxist... The essence of Stalinism lies in placing tactics before strategy, practice above theory... The bureaucracy generated by Stalinism is a tremendous evil. Society is suffocated by it. Everything becomes unreal, nominalistic. People see no design, no strategic aim, and do not move..." Thus Lukács concludes "we must learn to connect the great decisions of popular political power with personal needs, those of individuals.

— Marcus, Judith; Zoltan, Tarr (1989). pp. 215–216, Georg Lukács: Theory, Culture, and Politics

== Work ==
=== History and Class Consciousness ===
Written between 1919 and 1922 and published in 1923, Lukács's collection of essays History and Class Consciousness contributed to debates concerning Marxism and its relation to sociology, politics and philosophy. With this work, Lukács initiated the current of thought that came to be known as "Western Marxism". At Lukács' direction, there was no reprinting in his lifetime, making it rare and hard to acquire before 1968. Its return to prominence was aided by the social movements of the 1960s.

The most important essay in Lukács's book introduces the concept of "reification". In capitalist societies, human properties, relations and actions are transformed into properties, relations and actions of human-produced things, which become independent of them and govern their life. These human-created things are then imagined to be originally independent of the human. Moreover, human beings are transformed into thing-like beings that do not behave in a human way but according to the laws of the thing-world. This essay is notable for reconstructing aspects of Marx's theory of alienation before the publication of the Economic and Philosophical Manuscripts of 1844 — the work in which Marx most clearly expounds the theory.

Lukács also develops the Marxist theory of class consciousness – the distinction between the objective situation of a class and that class's subjective awareness of this situation. Lukács proffers a view of a class as an "historical imputed subject". An empirically existing class can successfully act only when it becomes conscious of its historical situation, i.e. when it transforms from a "class in itself" to a "class for itself". Lukács's theory of class consciousness has been influential within the sociology of knowledge.

In his later career, Lukács repudiated the ideas of History and Class Consciousness, in particular the belief in the proletariat as a "subject–object of history" (1960 Postface to French translation). As late as 1925–1926, he still defended these ideas, in an unfinished manuscript, which he called Tailism and the Dialectic. It was not published until 1996 in Hungarian and English in 2000 under the title A Defence of History and Class Consciousness.

==== What is Orthodox Marxism? ====
Lukács argues that methodology is the only thing that distinguishes Marxism: even if all its substantive propositions were rejected, it would remain valid because of its distinctive method:

Orthodox Marxism, therefore, does not imply the uncritical acceptance of the results of Marx's investigations. It is not the 'belief' in this or that thesis, nor the exegesis of a 'sacred' book. On the contrary, orthodoxy refers exclusively to method. It is the scientific conviction that dialectical materialism is the road to truth and that its methods can be developed, expanded and deepened only along the lines laid down by its founders.

— §1

He criticises Marxist revisionism by calling for the return to this Marxist method, which is fundamentally dialectical materialism. Lukács conceives "revisionism" as inherent to the Marxist theory, insofar as dialectical materialism is, according to him, the product of class struggle:

For this reason the task of orthodox Marxism, its victory over Revisionism and utopianism can never mean the defeat, once and for all, of false tendencies. It is an ever-renewed struggle against the insidious effects of bourgeois ideology on the thought of the proletariat. Marxist orthodoxy is no guardian of traditions, it is the eternally vigilant prophet proclaiming the relation between the tasks of the immediate present and the totality of the historical process.

— end of §5

According to him, "The premise of dialectical materialism is, we recall: 'It is not men's consciousness that determines their existence, but on the contrary, their social existence that determines their consciousness.' ...Only when the core of existence stands revealed as a social process can existence be seen as the product, albeit the hitherto unconscious product, of human activity." (§5). In line with Marx's thought, he criticises the individualist bourgeois philosophy of the subject, which founds itself on the voluntary and conscious subject. Against this ideology, he asserts the primacy of social relations. Existence – and thus the world – is the product of human activity; but this can be seen only if the primacy of social process on individual consciousness is accepted. Lukács does not restrain human liberty for sociological determinism: to the contrary, this production of existence is the possibility of praxis.

He conceives the problem in the relationship between theory and practice. Lukács quotes Marx's words: "It is not enough that thought should seek to realise itself; reality must also strive towards thought." How does the thought of intellectuals relate to class struggle, if theory is not simply to lag behind history, as it is in Hegel's philosophy of history ("Minerva always comes at the dusk of night...")? Lukács criticises Friedrich Engels's Anti-Dühring, saying that he "does not even mention the most vital interaction, namely the dialectical relation between subject and object in the historical process, let alone give it the prominence it deserves." This dialectical relation between subject and object is the basis of Lukács's critique of Immanuel Kant's epistemology, according to which the subject is the exterior, universal and contemplating subject, separated from the object.

For Lukács, "ideology" is a projection of the class consciousness of the bourgeoisie, which functions to prevent the proletariat from attaining consciousness of its revolutionary position. Ideology determines the "form of objectivity", thus the very structure of knowledge. According to Lukács, real science must attain the "concrete totality" through which only it is possible to think the current form of objectivity as a historical period. Thus, the so-called eternal "laws" of economics are dismissed as the ideological illusion projected by the current form of objectivity ("What is Orthodoxical Marxism?", §3). He also writes: "It is only when the core of being has shown itself as social becoming, that the being itself can appear as a product, so far unconscious, of human activity, and this activity, in turn, as the decisive element of the transformation of being." ("What is Orthodoxical Marxism?", §5) Finally, "orthodoxical Marxism" is not defined as an interpretation of Capital as if it were the Bible or an embrace of "Marxist thesis", but as fidelity to the "Marxist method", dialectics.

==== Reification and the Consciousness of the Proletariat ====
Drawing from the insights of Max Weber and Georg Simmel, Lukács introduces the concept of reification to describe the mystified consciousness of capitalist society, where human relations and activities are objectified as commodities. This idea builds on Marx's analysis of "commodity fetishism" in Capital. Under capitalism, human qualities are subordinated to the demands of production and exchange, reducing individuals to mere units of labour power. Rationalization — manifesting in legal systems, technology, and labour organization — fragments human activity and diminishes individuality. This specialization creates a society where holistic understanding becomes impossible, and bourgeois philosophy reinforces this fragmentation by prioritizing calculable, empirical facts over any unifying vision of reality.

For Lukács, bourgeois rationalism, with its reliance on abstract mathematics and calculability, excludes any meaningful engagement with the whole. It either confines itself to empirical reality or ventures into utopian speculation, neither of which can address the systemic contradictions of capitalism. The idealist dialectic, in its attempt to restore unity by emphasizing the subject's creativity, fails to grasp the revolutionary potential of human praxis.

Reification cannot be overcome within the limits of bourgeois consciousness. Only the proletariat, through its unique position as both a commodity and the creator of social reality, can grasp the totality of the social mechanism. When the proletariat achieves class consciousness, it recognizes and rebels against the pervasive reification of social life. This awakening is not mere awareness but a revolutionary act that liberates humanity from objectification. For the proletariat, truth is not a passive reflection of an external reality but part of a historical process of emancipation.

Lukács saw the destruction of society as a proper solution to the "cultural contradiction of the epoch". In 1969, he cited:

"Even though my ideas were confused from a theoretical point of view, I saw the revolutionary destruction of society as the one and only solution to the cultural contradictions of the epoch. Such a worldwide overturning of values cannot take place without the annihilation of the old values.

=== Literary and aesthetic work ===
In addition to his standing as a Marxist political thinker, Lukács was an influential literary critic of the twentieth century. His important work in literary criticism began early in his career, with The Theory of the Novel, a seminal work in literary theory and the theory of genre. The book is a history of the novel as a form, and an investigation into its distinct characteristics. In The Theory of the Novel, he coins the term "transcendental homelessness", which he defines as the "longing of all souls for the place in which they once belonged, and the 'nostalgia… for utopian perfection, a nostalgia that feels itself and its desires to be the only true reality'". Lukács maintains that "the novel is the necessary epic form of our time."

Lukács later repudiated The Theory of the Novel, writing a lengthy introduction that described it as erroneous, but nonetheless containing a "romantic anti-capitalism" which would later develop into Marxism. (This introduction also contains his famous dismissal of Theodor Adorno and others in Western Marxism as having taken up residence in the "Grand Hotel Abyss".)

Lukács's later literary criticism includes the well-known essay "Kafka or Thomas Mann?", in which Lukács argues for the work of Thomas Mann as a superior attempt to deal with the condition of modernity, and criticises Franz Kafka's brand of modernism. Lukács steadfastly opposed the formal innovations of modernist writers like Kafka, James Joyce, and Samuel Beckett, preferring the traditional aesthetic of realism.

During his time in Moscow in the 1930s, Lukács worked on Marxist views of aesthetics while belonging to the group around an influential Moscow magazine "The Literary Critic" (Literaturny Kritik). The editor of this magazine, Mikhail Lifshitz, was an important Soviet author on aesthetics. Lifshitz's views were very similar to Lukács's insofar as both argued for the value of traditional art; despite the drastic difference in age (Lifschitz was much younger), both Lifschitz and Lukács indicated that their working relationship at that time was a collaboration of equals. Lukács contributed frequently to this magazine, which was also followed by Marxist art theoreticians around the world through various translations published by the Soviet government.

The collaboration between Lifschitz and Lukács resulted in the formation of an informal circle of the like-minded Marxist intellectuals connected to the journal Literaturnyi Kritik [The Literary Critic], published monthly starting in the summer of 1933 by the Organisational Committee of the Writers' Union. ... A group of thinkers formed around Lifschitz, Lukács and Andrei Platonov; they were concerned with articulating the aesthetical views of Marx and creating a kind of Marxist aesthetics that had not yet been properly formulated.

Lukács famously argued for the revolutionary character of the novels of Sir Walter Scott and Honoré de Balzac. Lukács felt that both authors' nostalgic, pro-aristocratic politics allowed them accurate and critical stances because of their opposition (albeit reactionary) to the rising bourgeoisie. This view was expressed in his later book The Historical Novel (published in Russian in 1937, then in Hungarian in 1947), as well as in his essay "Realism in the Balance" (1938).

The Historical Novel is probably Lukács's most influential work of literary history. In it, he traces the development of the genre of historical fiction. While prior to 1789, he argues, people's consciousness of history was relatively underdeveloped, the French Revolution and Napoleonic wars that followed brought about a realisation of the constantly changing, evolving character of human existence. This new historical consciousness was reflected in the work of Sir Walter Scott, whose novels use 'representative' or 'typical' characters to dramatise major social conflicts and historical transformations, for example, the dissolution of feudal society in the Scottish Highlands and the entrenchment of mercantile capitalism. Lukács argues that Scott's new brand of historical realism was taken up by Balzac and Tolstoy, and enabled novelists to depict contemporary social life not as a static drama of fixed, universal types, but rather as a moment of history, constantly changing, open to the potential of revolutionary transformation. For this reason, he sees these authors as progressive and their work as potentially radical, despite their own personal conservative politics.

For Lukács, this historical realist tradition began to give way after the 1848 revolutions, when the bourgeoisie ceased to be a progressive force and their role as agents of history was usurped by the proletariat. After this time, historical realism begins to sicken and lose its concern with social life as inescapably historical. He illustrates this point by comparing Flaubert's historical novel Salammbô to that of the earlier realists. For him, Flaubert's work marks a turning away from relevant social issues and an elevation of style over substance. Why he does not discuss Sentimental Education, a novel much more overtly concerned with recent historical developments, is not clear. For much of his life Lukács promoted a return to the realist tradition that he believed had reached its height with Balzac and Scott, and bemoaned the supposed neglect of history that characterised modernism.

The Historical Novel has been hugely influential in subsequent critical studies of historical fiction, and no serious analyst of the genre fails to engage at some level with Lukács's arguments.

==== Critical and socialist realism ====
Lukács defined realistic literature as literature capable of relating human life to the totality. He distinguishes between two forms of realism, critical and socialist. Lukács argued that it was precisely the desire for a realistic depiction of life that enabled politically reactionary writers such as Balzac, Walter Scott and Tolstoy to produce great, timeless and socially progressive works. According to Lukács, there is a contradiction between worldview and talent among such writers. He greatly valued the comments made in that direction by Lenin on Tolstoy and especially by Engels on Balzac, where Engels describes the "triumph of realism":

Balzac boldly exposed the contradiction of nascent capitalist society and hence his observation of reality constantly clashed with his political prejudices. But as an honest artist he always depicted only what he himself saw, learned and underwent, concerning himself not at all whether his-true-to-life description of the things he saw contradicted his pet ideas.

Critical realists include writers who did not adopt the communist worldview, but tried to reflect the conflicts of the era, not content with the direct description of single events. A great story speaks through individual human destinies in their work. Such writers are not naturalists, allegorists and metaphysicians. They do not flee from the world into the isolated human soul and do not seek to raise its experiences to the rank of timeless, eternal and irresistible properties of human nature. Balzac, Tolstoy, Anatole France, Romain Rolland, George Bernard Shaw, Lion Feuchtwanger and Thomas Mann are writers commonly associated with critical realism.

Lukács notes that realistic art is usually found either in highly developed countries or in countries undergoing a period of rapid socio-economic development, yet it is possible that backward countries often give rise to advanced literature precisely because of their backwardness, which they seek to overcome by artistic means. Lukács (together with Lifshitz) polemicized against the "vulgar sociological" thesis then dominant in Soviet literary criticism. The "vulgar sociologists" (associated with the former RAPP) prioritized class origin as the most important determinant for an artist and his work, categorizing artists and artistic genres as "feudal", "bourgeois", "petty-bourgeois" etc. Lukács and Lifshitz sought to prove that such great artists as Dante, Shakespeare, Cervantes, Goethe or Tolstoy were able to rise above their class worldview by grasping the dialectic of individual and society in its totality and depicting their relations truthfully.

All modernist art – avant-garde, naturalism, expressionism, surrealism, etc. – is the opposite of realism. This is decadent art, examples of which are the works of Kafka, Joyce, Musil, Beckett, etc. The main shortcoming of modernism, which predicts its inevitable defeat, is the inability to perceive the totality and carry out the act of mediation. One cannot blame the writer for describing loneliness, but one must show it in such a way that it is clear to everyone: human loneliness is an inevitable consequence of capitalist social relations. Whereas in Kafka, we meet with "ontological solitariness", depicted as a permanent situation of man and a universal value. In this regard, Kafka stops at the description of the phenomenon, given directly; he is not able to rise to the totality, which alone can reveal the meaning of loneliness. Therefore, Kafka acts like the naturalists. In order for the image of chaos, confusion and fear of the modern world and man to be realistic, the writer must show the social roots that generate all these phenomena. And if, like Joyce, one depicts the spiritual world and the sense of time of a person in a state of absolute decay, without bothering to search for reasons and prospects for a way out, then the writer gives a false image of the world, and his works must be recognized as immature.

So, modernism is deprived of a historical perspective, tying the person to positions and situations that are not really historically and socially determined. Modernism transforms such situations into transcendental qualities. The great images of great literature, Achilles and Werther, Oedipus and Tom Joad, Antigone and Anna Karenina, are social beings, for Aristotle already noted that man is a social being. And the heroes of modernist literature are torn out of their ties with society and history. Narrative becomes purely "subjective", the animal in man is opposed to the social in him, which corresponds to Heidegger's denial and condemnation of society as something impersonal. He wrote:

Literary and art history is a mass graveyard where many artists of talent rest in deserved oblivion because they neither sought nor found any association to the problems of advancing humanity and did not set themselves on the right side in the vital struggle between health and decay.

Barbara Stackman maintains that, for Lukács, decadents are decadent not because they depict illness and decay, but because they do not recognize the existence of health, of the social sphere that would reunite the alienated writer to the progressive forces of history. Sickness, then, is a reactionary mode of insertion into the class struggle; sickness, writes Lukács, "produces a complete overturning of values." Though "sick art" may have its dialectical moment in the sun (Lukács cites only Antigone as an example where that which is declining may even appear as human greatness and purity), it is destined for the dust heap of history, while "healthy art" is a "reflection of the lasting truth of human relationships."

On the other hand, socialist realism is recognized as the highest stage in the development of literature:

The prospect of socialist realism is, of course, the struggle for socialism. Socialist realism differs from critical realism not only in that it is based on a specific socialist perspective, but also in that it uses this perspective to describe from within the forces that work in favor of socialism. Critical realists have more than once described the political struggle of our time and depicted heroes – socialists and communists. But only socialist realists describe such heroes from the inside, thus identifying them with the forces of progress. The greatness of socialist realism lies in the fact that the historical totality, directed towards communism, becomes clear as daylight in any fragment of a given work.

In 1938, in his work Realism in the Balance, a polemic against Ernst Bloch, Walter Benjamin, Bertolt Brecht and Theodor Adorno, Lukács explained the lack of modernism in the Soviet Union in this way:

The more the domination of the proletariat strengthened, the more deeply and comprehensively socialism penetrated the economy of the Soviet Union, the wider and deeper the cultural revolution embraced the working masses, the stronger and more hopelessly "avant-garde" art was pushed out by an ever more conscious realism. The decline of expressionism is ultimately a consequence of the maturity of the revolutionary masses.

No less typical is his article "Propaganda or Partisanship?", in which he polemicizes against the definition of socialist art as "tendentious." Literature, in his opinion, should not be biased, but only "party-spirited" in the essence of taking the side of the class that is objectively progressive in the given historical moment. Tendentious literature eclectically connects "pure art" with politically alien elements brought in from outside. But such a program, which Franz Mehring once defended, means "the primacy of form over content" and contrasts the aesthetic and political elements of the work. This understanding of art, Lukács says, is Trotskyist.

Lukács' defence of socialist realism contained a critique of Stalinism and a condemnation of most of the party-propagandistic Soviet literature of the 1930s and 1940s (which was based on Andrei Zhdanov's doctrine of "conflictless art" and which Lukács dismissively called "illustrative" literature) as a distortion of true socialist realism. He acknowledged that Stalinism suffered from a lack of "mediation" in the field of cultural policy. Instead of describing the real conflicts of the life of a socialist society, Stalinist literature turned into bare schemes and abstractions, describing the general truths of theory and in no way "mediating" them with images taken from reality. The specificity of art was forgotten, and it turned into an instrument of agitation. Schematic optimism has spread in place of the historical. The heroes did not represent any of the typical qualities of the new society. Lenin's article "Party Organization and Party Literature", which, as Nadezhda Krupskaya said, dealt only with political literature, turned into a rule of artistic activity and its evaluation.

Despite all this criticism, Lukács never changed his basic conviction: socialist realism represents a "fundamentally" and "historically" higher stage in the development of art than all its predecessors.

The most surprising product of Lukács' discourse on socialist realism is his articles on Alexander Solzhenitsyn, whom he considered to be the greatest "plebeian realist" writer of the twentieth century. Lukács welcomed the appearance of the writer's short stories and novellas as the first sign of the renaissance of socialist realism, since Solzhenitsyn, in describing camp life in A Day in the Life of Ivan Denisovich, depicts everyday events as a symbol of an entire era. Nor is Solzhenitsyn a naturalist, since he refers the events described to the socio-historical totality and does not seek to restore capitalism in Russia. According to Lukács, Solzhenitsyn criticizes Stalinism from a plebeian, and not from a communist point of view. And if he does not overcome this weakness, then his artistic talent will decrease.

=== Ontology of social being ===
Later in life, Lukács undertook a major exposition on the ontology of social being, which has been partly published in English in three volumes. The work is a systematic treatment of dialectical philosophy in its materialist form.

== Bibliography ==
- History and Class Consciousness (1972). ISBN 0-262-62020-0.
- The Theory of the Novel (1974). ISBN 0-262-62027-8.
- Lenin: A Study in the Unity of His Thought (1998). ISBN 1-85984-174-0.
- A Defense of History and Class Consciousness (2000). ISBN 1-85984-747-1.
- The culture of people's democracy : Hungarian essays on literature, art, and democratic transition, 1945–1948 (2013). ISBN 9789004217270

== See also ==
- Lajos Jánossy, Lukács's adopted son
- Marx's notebooks on the history of technology

== Notes ==
Political offices
| Preceded by Zsigmond Kunfi | People's Commissar of Education; 1919 | Succeeded by József Pogány |
| Preceded by József Darvas | Minister of Culture; 1956 | Succeeded by post abolished |
