= Young Marx =

Karl Marx's writings from 1843 and 1844

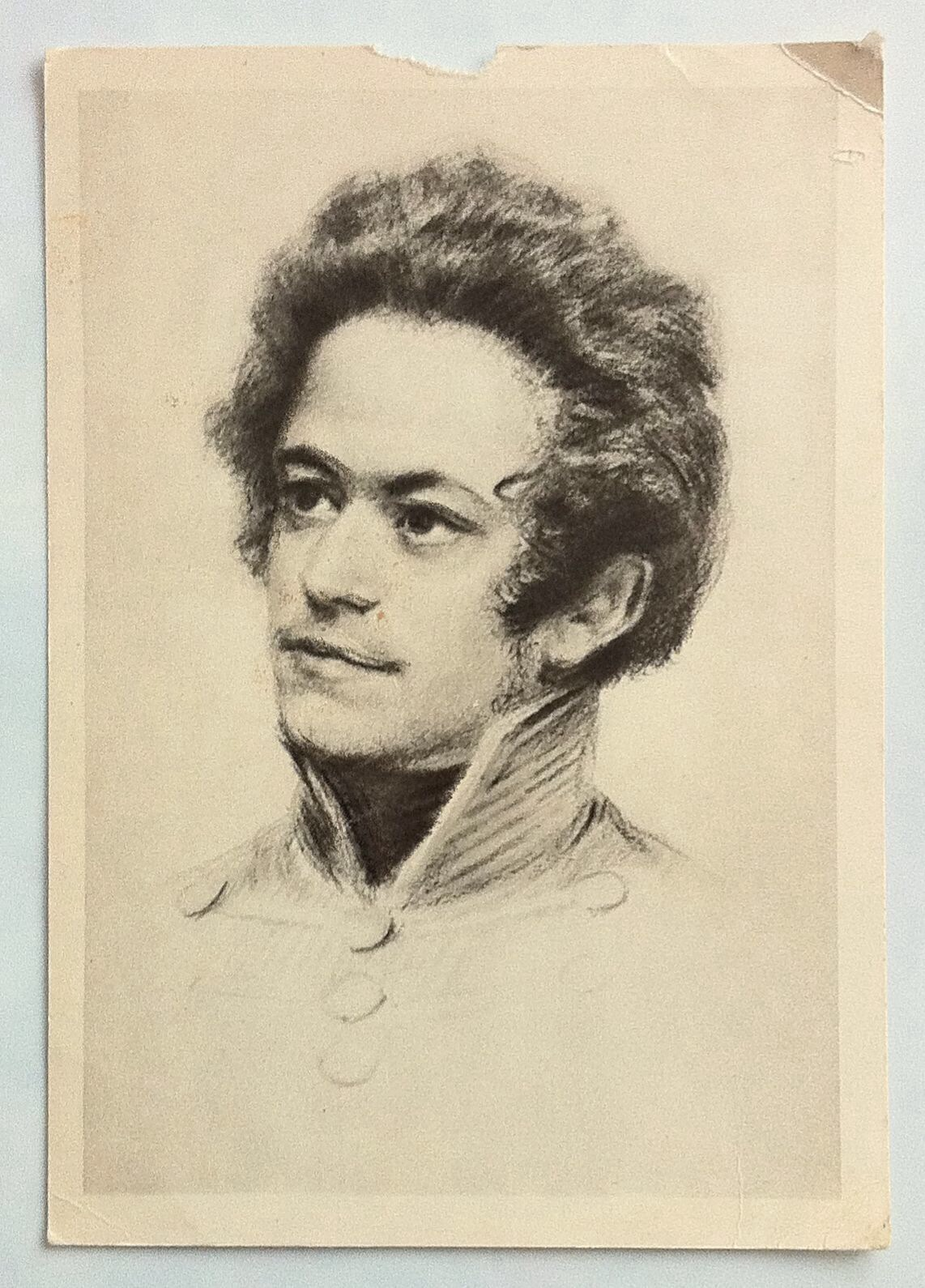
Karl Marx before 1840

The correct place of Karl Marx's early writings within his system as a whole has been a matter of great controversy. Some believe there is a break in Marx's intellectual development that divides his thought into two periods: the "Young Marx" is said to be a thinker who deals with the problem of alienation, while the "Mature Marx" is said to aspire to a scientific socialism.

The debate centers on the reasons for Marx's transition from philosophy to the analysis of modern capitalist society. The controversy arose with the posthumous publication of the works that Marx wrote before 1845 — particularly the Economic and Philosophic Manuscripts of 1844 — which had been unavailable to earlier generations of Marxists. First published between 1927 and 1932, these writings provide a philosophical background to the economic, historical and political works that Marx had hitherto been known for.

Some forms of Orthodox Marxism emphasize that it is a kind of scientific socialism, and de-emphasize Marxism's debt to Hegelianism. Marxist humanism, on the other hand, sees continuity between the Hegelian philosophical humanism of the early Marx and the work of the later Marx.

== The publication of the "early writings" ==
The majority of the texts that are classed as belonging to Marx's "early writings" - his writings from the early 1840s - were not published during his lifetime. Some of the most important of these, such as the Critique of Hegel's Philosophy of Right and the Economic and Philosophic Manuscripts of 1844, were not written for publication. While Marx preserved his study notebooks from this period, he showed little interest in either publishing the unpublished works, or retaining his published works such as The Holy Family.

An effort at unearthing Marx's early writings was undertaken by Franz Mehring, who in 1902 published a collection Aus dem literarischen Nachlass von Karl Marx, Friedrich Engels, und Ferdinand Lassalle, which contained previously published works of Marx such as The Holy Family and his articles for the Deutsch–Französische Jahrbücher. It was not until 1927 that the early writings began to appear more fully, as part of the Marx-Engels-Gesamtausgabe edition. The MEGA included scholarly versions of the Critique, the Manuscripts and Marx's Notes on James Mill. However, this project was cancelled shortly after it was begun. Marx's early writings did not become more widely disseminated until many years later, with satisfactory editions of the Manuscripts appearing in English only in 1956, and in French in 1962.

One reason for the lack of interest from Marx in his earlier writings was their basis in the philosophy of Georg Wilhelm Friedrich Hegel. In his lifetime, Marx was not well-known outside of a small circle until 1867, when the first volume of Capital was published. By this time, Hegel was seen as long out of date, and no importance was attached to his influence on Marx. Marx was instead viewed as an economist who had set out to prove scientifically the inevitable decline of capitalism.

The intellectual development of the Marxists of the Second International such as Karl Kautsky, Georgi Plekhanov, Eduard Bernstein and Heinrich Cunow took place in a cultural climate dominated by Darwinism. This interest in Darwinism was shared by Friedrich Engels. In the later years of Marx's life and shortly after Marx's death, Engels published a number of philosophical works: Anti-Duhring, The Origin of the Family, Private Property and the State and Ludwig Feuerbach and the End of Classical German Philosophy. These writings were seen to provide a general philosophical theory that was absent in Marx himself. It was primarily through these later works of Engels that the first generation of Marxists were attracted to Marxism. For them, Marxism was an objective and scientific doctrine of the laws of social development - a "scientific socialism" free from any ethical or metaphysical elements.

The factors contributing to a delay of interest in the young Marx were not merely intellectual, but also political. The publication of Marx's early writings arrived against a backdrop of Marxism being increasingly identified with the Soviet Union and an "orthodox" interpretation of Marxist theory that had been codified by the Third International. This version of Marxism struggled to reconcile Marx’s early works with its own ideological framework. The editor of the Marx-Engels-Gesamtausgabe, David Ryazanov, was forced into internal exile within the Soviet Union, before being executed in the great purges in 1938. Soviet Marxism dismissed Marx's early writings as a theoretical dead end. A conspicuous example of this is the decision by the East German Institute of Marxism-Leninism to exclude the Economic and Philosophical Manuscripts from its Marx-Engels Werke and publish them in a separate volume.

In other quarters, the early writings were welcomed precisely because they appeared to cast doubt on the authority of Soviet Marxism. Prior to their discovery, the groundwork for an understanding of their importance had been laid by two books published in 1923 - Karl Korsch's Marxism and Philosophy and György Lukács's History and Class Consciousness. Korsch and Lukács emphasized the Hegelian element to Marx, seeming to criticize official Marxism from the more open and critical position of the young Marx.

In 1932, an alternative volume of the Economic and Philosophic Manuscripts edited by Siegfried Landshut and J-P Mayer appeared. Landshut and Mayer claimed that the Manuscripts revealed the previously hidden thread that ran throughout Marx’s entire output, allowing his later work to be understood properly for the first time. Herbert Marcuse argued that the Manuscripts demonstrated the philosophical foundations of Marxism, putting "the entire theory of 'scientific socialism' on a new footing". Similarly, in the Manuscripts Marshall Berman believed he had discovered "something special": "Marx, but not communism".

== The debate over Marx's intellectual continuity ==
The Young Marx is usually still considered part of humanist "bourgeois" philosophy, which Marx later criticized along with German idealism. Marx viewed social relations as taking precedence over individual consciousness - a product of ideology according to him. Marxist humanists stressed the humanistic philosophical foundations of Marx's thought by focusing on the Economic and Philosophical Manuscripts of 1844. In this work, Marx expounds his theory of alienation, which echoes many of the themes of Ludwig Feuerbach's The Essence of Christianity (1841).

The theory prominent in the Manuscripts is a "return to species-being" - a normative, anthropological theory. Some commentators suggest that the later Marx abandons this idea in favour of a structural description. Sidney Hook, Daniel Bell and Lewis Feuer hold that the change in mode of exposition in Marx's magnum opus Capital corresponds to a change in his ideas. An extreme representative of this position is the Marxist philosopher Louis Althusser, who argues that the young Marx can not be read while presupposing "fully-developed Marxism". Althusser thus poses the question of how one may conceive the transformation of Marx's thought without adopting an idealist perspective. Althusser wishes to avoid a teleological view, which holds that Marx's early writings express the contents of the Mature Marx's theory in a nascent state using Feuerbachian language. For Althusser, this would mark a return to Georg Wilhelm Friedrich Hegel's spiritual dialectics.

Jean-Yves Calvez, Robert C. Tucker, David McLellan, Iring Fetscher, Shlomo Avineri, István Mészáros and Leszek Kołakowski deny there is any break between the Young Marx and the Old Marx. Siegfried Landshut, J-P Mayer, Heinrich Popitz, and Erich Fromm hold that the theory of the early Marx is richer than the more intellectually restricted theory of the later Marx. Commentators such as Benedetto Croce, Karl Löwith and Sidney Hook argue that the later Marx abandons Hegelianism completely, a view disparaged by György Lukács, Iring Fetscher, Robert C. Tucker and Shlomo Avineri.

Ernest Mandel distinguishes three different positions with respect to the controversy:

(1) The position of those who try to deny that there is any difference between the Economic and Philosophic Manuscripts and Capital, and find the essentials of the theses of Capital already present in the Manuscripts.

(2) The position of those who consider that compared to the Marx of Capital, the Marx of the Manuscripts sets out in a more "total" and "integral" way the problem of alienated labor, especially by giving an ethical, anthropological, and even philosophical dimension to the idea; these people either contrast the two Marxs or else "re-evaluate" Capital in the light of the Manuscripts.

(3) The position of those who consider that the conceptions of the young Marx of the Manuscripts on alienated labor not only contradict the economic analysis of Capital but were an obstacle that made it difficult for the young Marx to accept the labor theory of value. For the extreme representatives of this school, the concept of alienation is a "pre-Marxist" concept which Marx had to overcome before he could arrive at a scientific analysis of capitalist economy.

— Ernest Mandel, The Formation of the Economic Thought of Karl Marx, p. 164

Mandel views all of these as erroneous. The first school fails to recognize the significant evolution in Marx's thinking. The second school romanticizes the young Marx and misrepresents the mature Marx's focus on socio-economic analysis. The third school ignores the fact that Marx continued to employ the concept of alienation in his mature works like the Grundrisse.

Mandel's view is that Marx's concept of alienation evolved from a philosophical and anthropological to an historical understanding. Initially, Marx viewed alienation through a philosophical lens influenced by Hegel and Feuerbach, focusing on the estrangement of "species being." Through his critique of political economy, Marx transitioned to an historical conception, grounding alienation in specific social relations, particularly the division of labor and commodity production.

Mandel argues that in the mature Marx, alienation manifests in various forms: economic, political, and technical, culminating under capitalist production. For the mature Marx, alienation is no longer rooted in human nature, but in specific historical conditions, particularly commodity production and private ownership of the means of production. The possibility of overcoming alienation lies in the abolition of these conditions and the establishment of a society based on collective control of production.

Étienne Balibar argues that Marx's works cannot be divided into "economic works" (Das Kapital), "philosophical works" and "historical works" (The Eighteenth Brumaire of Louis Napoleon or the 1871 The Civil War in France). Marx's philosophy is inextricably linked to his critique of political economy and to his historical interventions in the workers' movement, such as the 1875 Critique of the Gotha Program. The problematic is also related to Marx's rupture with university and its teachings concerning German idealism and his encounter with the proletariat, leading him to write along with Friedrich Engels The Communist Manifesto a year before the Revolutions of 1848. Marxism's philosophical roots were commonly explained (for example by Vladimir Lenin) as derived from three sources: English political economy; French utopian socialism, republicanism and radicalism; and German philosophy.

== Various breaks ==
Vladimir Lenin claimed Marx's first mature work as The Poverty of Philosophy (1847) in his own work State and Revolution (1917). Louis Althusser, who was a champion of this young–mature dichotomy in his criticisms of Marxist humanism (Praxis School, John Lewis and the like) and existential Marxism, claimed in the 1960s that The German Ideology (written in 1845), in which Marx criticized Bruno Bauer, Max Stirner and other Young Hegelians, marked the break with this young Marx. Furthermore, the Trotskyist Ernest Mandel in his The Place of Marxism in History (1986) also broke Marx's intellectual development into several different stages. Althusser presented, in his For Marx (1965), a number of other opinions:

For Jahn, for example, although they 'still' contain 'a whole series of abstract elements' the 1844 Manuscripts mark 'the birth of scientific socialism'. For Pajitnov, these manuscripts 'form the crucial pivot around which Marx reoriented the social sciences. The theoretical premises of Marxism had been laid down.' For Lapine, 'unlike the articles in the Rheinische Zeitung in which certain elements of materialism only appear spontaneously, the 1843 Manuscript witnesses to Marx's conscious passage to materialism', and in fact 'Marx's critique of Hegel starts from materialist positions '(it is true that this 'conscious passage' is called 'implicit' and 'unconscious' in the same article). As for Schaff, he writes squarely 'We know (from later statements of Engels) that Marx became a materialist in 1841'. I am not trying to make an easy argument out of these contradictions (which might at little cost be set aside as signs of an 'open' investigation). But it is legitimate to ask whether this uncertainty about the moment when Marx passed on to materialism, etc., is not related to the spontaneous and implicit use of an analytico-teleological theory.

=== Louis Althusser's "epistemological break" ===
Louis Althusser popularized the conception of an "epistemological break" between the Young Marx and the mature Marx - the point where Marx broke with ideology to enter the domain of science - a point generally considered to consist in his break with Ludwig Feuerbach. However, the epistemological break, a concept which Althusser drew out of Gaston Bachelard, is not to be conceived as a chronological point, but as a "process", thus making the question of the distinction between a "Young Marx" and a "mature Marx" a problematic one. Althusser characterized Marx's German Ideology and Theses on Feuerbach, written in 1845, as "works of the break", which were then followed by a series of transitional works from 1845 to 1857, Marx's first Mature Work being the first drafts of Capital.

Althusser noted that the interest in the Young Marx, that is in the 1844 Manuscripts and other early works, was no longer a matter of interest only for Western Marxism, e.g. Palmiro Togliatti, but also of Soviet studies, first of all, that the very discussion of early Marx carries political tones as the Soviet Union's attitude to the subject is not very approving. He also noted that as Jahn had noted that "it was not Marxists who opened the debate on Marx's Early Works", indicating the political stakes surrounding it: "For this attack surprised Marxists on their own ground: that of Marx". Althusser then criticizes the Marxist response to this attack:

To discomfit those who set up against Marx his own youth, the opposite position is resolutely taken up: Marx is reconciled with his youth—Capital is no longer read as On the Jewish Question, On the Jewish Question is read as Capital; the shadow of the young Marx is no longer projected on to Marx, but that of Marx on to the young Marx; and a pseudo-theory of the history of philosophy in the 'future anterior' is erected to justify this counter-position, without realizing that this pseudo-theory is quite simply Hegelian. A devout fear of a blow to Marx's integrity inspires as its reflex a resolute acceptance of the whole of Marx: Marx is declared to be a whole, ' the young Marx is part of Marxism 'as if we risked losing the whole of Marx if we were to submit his youth to the radical critique of history, not the history he was going to live, but the history he did live, not an immediate history, but the reflected history for which, in his maturity, he gave us, not the ' truth ' in the Hegelian sense, but the principles of its scientific understanding.

Thereby, Althusser warns against any attempts at reading in a teleological way Marx, that is in claiming that the mature Marx was already in the young Marx and necessarily derived from him:

Capital is an ethical theory, the silent philosophy of which is openly spoken in Marx's Early Works. Thus, reduced to two propositions, is the thesis which has had such extraordinary success. And not only in France and in Italy, but also, as these articles from abroad show, in contemporary Germany and Poland. Philosophers, ideologues, theologians have all launched into a gigantic enterprise of criticism and conversion: let Marx be restored to his source, and let him admit at last that in him, the mature man is merely the young man in disguise. Or if he stubbornly insists on his age, let him admit the sins of his maturity, let him recognize that he sacrificed philosophy to economics, ethics to science, man to history. Let him consent to this or refuse it, his truth, everything that will survive him, everything which helps the men that we are to live and think, is contained in these few Early Works. So these good critics leave us with but a single choice: we must admit that Capital (and 'mature Marxism' in general) is either an expression of the Young Marx's philosophy, or its betrayal. In either case, the established interpretation must be totally revised and we must return to the Young Marx, the Marx through whom spoke the Truth. This is the location of the discussion: the Young Marx. Really at stake in it: Marxism. The terms of the discussion : whether the Young Marx was already and wholly Marx.

Althusser then criticizes the "eclectic" reading of Marx's early works, which instead of reading the text as a "whole", discompose it in various "elements" which it then judges as either "materialist" or "idealist" elements. Marx should not be read in a teleological perspective, which would be a return to Hegel's idealist philosophy of history, thus he writes:

From the Hegelian viewpoint, Early Works are as inevitable and as impossible as the singular object displayed by Jarry: "the skull of the child Voltaire". They are as inevitable as all beginnings. They are impossible because it is impossible to choose one's beginnings. Marx did not choose to be born to the thought German history had concentrated in its university education, nor to think its ideological world. He grew up in this world, in it he learned to live and move, with it he 'settled accounts', from it he liberated himself. I shall return to the necessity and contingency of this beginning later. The fact is that there was a beginning, and that to work out the history of Marx's particular thoughts their movement must be grasped at the precise instant when that concrete individual the Young Marx emerged into the thought world of his own time, to think in it in his turn, and to enter into the exchange and debate with the thoughts of his time which was to be his whole life as an ideologue. At this level of the exchanges and conflicts that are the very substance of the texts in which his living thoughts have come down to us, it is as if the authors of these thoughts were themselves absent. The concrete individual who expresses himself in his thoughts and his writings is absent, so is the actual history expressed in the existing ideological field. As the author effaces himself in the presence of his published thoughts, reducing himself to their rigour, so concrete history effaces itself in the presence of its ideological themes, reducing itself to their system. This double absence will also have to be put to the test. But for the moment, everything is in play between the rigour of a single thought and the thematic system of an ideological field. Their relation is this beginning and this beginning has no end. This is the relationship that has to be thought: the relation between the (internal) unity of a single thought (at each moment of its development) and the existing ideological field (at each moment of its development). But if this relationship is to be thought, so, in the same movement, must its terms.

== Criticisms ==
Marxist humanists do not argue that Marx's thought never developed, but criticise the dichotomy between young and mature as being too rigid, instead emphasizing the continuity in Marx's development. One piece of evidence used by Marxist humanists to highlight the importance of Marx's early works is that Marx himself in 1851 tried to have two volumes of his early writings published. David McLellan and Leszek Kołakowski both note that in the afterword to the second edition of Capital, vol. 1, published in 1871, Marx makes reference to criticisms of Hegel that he made thirty years prior. They take this to refer to the 1844 Manuscripts. Kołakowski further notes that while Marx does not use the term "alienation", the description of commodity fetishism found in the first chapter of Capital is the same as in his earlier works, as is the analogy with religion which he owes to Feuerbach.

François Châtelet denied the existence of a rupture in 1957 between the young Marx and a mature Marx who would have discarded his errors and assume "mastery of his thought". Instead, he considered that the tensions in his thought continued on until his death in 1883. This thesis, concentrating itself on the tensions in Marx's thought instead of an alleged maturity of his thought, would also be upheld by Étienne Balibar (1993).

Others contended that Althusser's "epistemological break" between The Economic-Philosophical Manuscripts (1844) and The German Ideology (1845), in which some new concepts are forged, is a bit too abrupt, although almost no one contests the radical shifts. Though Althusser steadfastly held onto the claim of its existence, he later asserted that the turning point's occurrence around 1845 was not so clearly defined, as traces of humanism, historicism and Hegelianism were to be found in Capital. He went so far as to state that only Marx's Critique of the Gotha Programme and some notes on a book by Adolph Wagner were fully free from humanist ideology. Althusser considered the epistemological break to be a process instead of a clearly defined event - the product of the incessant struggle against ideology. Althusser believed in the existence of class struggle in theory itself. This struggle marked the division point between those philosophers who contented themselves with providing various ideological "interpretations" of the world and those who endeavoured to "transform" the world as Marx had put it in his Theses on Feuerbach (1845).

Furthermore, other important shifts in Marx's thought have been highlighted (e.g. Étienne Balibar), in particular following the failure of the 1848 revolutions, in particular in France with Louis-Napoleon Bonaparte's December 2, 1851 coup d'état and then after the crush of the 1871 Paris Commune.

== See also ==
- André Gorz
- Antihumanism
- C. Wright Mills
- Commodity fetishism
- Jean-Paul Sartre
- Late Marx
- Marx's theory of alienation
- Marxist humanism
- Marxist philosophy
- New Left
- Praxis School
- The Young Karl Marx

== Bibliography ==
- Althusser, Louis (2005) [1965]. For Marx. Translated by Brewster, Ben. London: Verso Books. ISBN 978-1-84467-052-9.
- Avineri, Shlomo (1968). The Social and Political Thought of Karl Marx. Cambridge: Cambridge University Press. ISBN 0-521-09619-7.
- Benton, Ted (1984). The Rise and Fall of Structural Marxism: Althusser and his Influence. New York: Macmillan Education. ISBN 978-0-312-68375-7.
- Berman, Marshall (2018-05-05) [1999]. "Adventures in Marxism". Jacobin.
- Calvez, Jean-Yves (1970) [1956]. La Pensée de Karl Marx. Paris: Editions du Seuil. ISBN 2-02-000342-2. OL 12385453M.
- Colletti, Lucio (1992) [1974]. Introduction. Early Writings. By Marx, Karl. Translated by Livingstone, Rodney; Benton, Gregory. London: Penguin Classics. pp. 7–56. ISBN 0-14-044574-9.
- Fetscher, Iring (1971). Marx and Marxism. Translated by John Hargreaves. New York: Herder and Herder.
- Feuer, Lewis S. (1969). Marx and the Intellectuals: A Set of Post-Ideological Essays. Doubleday Anchor.
- Fromm, Erich (1966) [1961]. Marx's Concept of Man. New York: Frederick Ungar Publishing Co. ISBN 978-0-8044-6161-0.
- Fromm, Erich (1991) [1956]. The Sane Society (2nd ed.). London: Routledge. ISBN 978-0-415-27098-4.
- Hook, Sidney (1962) [1950]. From Hegel To Marx: Studies in the Intellectual Development of Karl Marx. Ann Arbor, Michigan: University of Michigan Press.
- Kołakowski, Leszek (1978). Main Currents of Marxism, Vol. 1: The Founders. Oxford: Clarendon Press. ISBN 0-19-824547-5.
- Leopold, David (2007). The Young Karl Marx: German Philosophy, Modern Politics and Human Flourishing. Cambridge: Cambridge University Press. ISBN 978-0-511-28935-4.
- Mandel, Ernest (1971). The Formation of the Economic Thought of Karl Marx: 1843 to Capital. Translated by Pearce, Brian. London: Monthly Review Press.
- Marcuse, Herbert (1972) [1932]. "The Foundation of Historical Materialism". Studies in Critical Philosophy. Beacon Press Boston. pp. 1–48. ISBN 0-8070-1528-8 – via Marxists Internet Archive.
- Marx, Karl (1881). Economic Manuscripts: Marx's Notes on Adolph Wagner German and English – via Marxist Internet Archive.
- McLellan, David (1980) [1970]. Marx Before Marxism (Second ed.). London: The Macmillan Press Ltd. ISBN 978-0-333-27883-3.
- Mészáros, Istvan (1970). Marx's Theory of Alienation. London: Merlin Press. ISBN 9780850361193.
- Petrovic, Gajo (1967). Marx in the mid-twentieth century. Garden City, New York: Anchor Books. OL 20663426M – via Open Library.
- Popitz, Heinrich (1968) [1967]. Der entfremdete Mensch: Zeitkritik und Geschichtsphilosophie des jungen Marx. Kritische Studien zur Philosophie. Vol. 2 (2., unveränderte Auflage ed.). Frankfurt am Main: Europäische Verlagsanstalt.
- Schacht, Richard (1970). Alienation. Garden City, New York: Doublkeday & Company, Inc.
- Tucker, Robert C. (1972) [1961]. Philosophy and Myth in Karl Marx. London: Cambridge University Press. ISBN 0-521-09701-0.
