= Marxist humanism =

School of Marxism aligned with humanist philosophies

Marxist humanism is a philosophical and political movement that interprets Karl Marx's works through a humanist lens, focusing on human nature and the social conditions that best support human flourishing. Marxist humanists argue that these themes were central to Marx's own thought.

Marxist humanism emerged in 1932 with the publication of Marx's Economic and Philosophic Manuscripts of 1844, and reached a degree of prominence in the 1950s and 1960s. Marxist humanists contend that there is continuity between the early philosophical writings of Marx, in which he develops his theory of alienation, and the structural description of capitalist society found in his later works such as Capital. They hold that it is necessary to grasp Marx's philosophical foundations to understand his later works properly.

Contrary to the official dialectical materialism of the Soviet Union and to the structural Marxism of Louis Althusser, Marxist humanists argue that Marx's work was an extension or transcendence of enlightenment humanism. Where other Marxist philosophies see Marxism as a natural science, Marxist humanism believes that humans are fundamentally distinct from the rest of the natural order, and cannot be studied by the methods of natural science alone. Marxist humanism emphasizes human agency, subjectivity and ethics, reaffirming the doctrine of man is the measure of all things.

== Origins ==
=== The philosophical roots ===
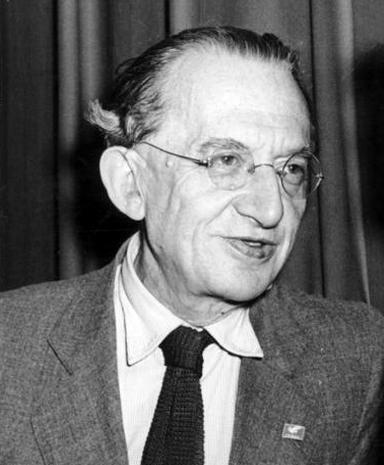
György Lukács

The beginnings of Marxist humanism lie with the publication of György Lukács's History and Class Consciousness and Karl Korsch's Marxism and Philosophy in 1923. In these books, Lukács and Korsch proffer a Marxism that emphasizes the Hegelian element of Karl Marx's thought. Marxism is not simply a theory of political economy that improves on its predecessors. Nor is it a scientific sociology, akin to the natural sciences. Marxism is primarily a critique – a self-conscious transformation of society.

Korsch's book underscores Marx's doctrine of the unity of theory and practice, viewing socialist revolution as the "realization of philosophy". Marxism does not make philosophy obsolete, as "vulgar" Marxism believes; instead Marxism preserves the truths of philosophy until their revolutionary transformation into reality.

The salient essay in Lukács's collection introduces the concept of "reification". In capitalist societies, human qualities, relationships, and actions are treated as if they belong to objects created by Man — objects that then appear as if they were originally independent of Man, and seem to control human life. Conversely, human beings are transformed into thing-like beings that do not behave in a human way but according to the logic of objects. Lukács argues that elements of this concept are implicit in the analysis of commodity fetishism found in Marx's magnum opus Capital. Bourgeois society perceives value as inherent in objects, and even treats people as commodities. This obscures the role of human action in creating social meaning.

The writings of Antonio Gramsci were also extremely important in the development of a humanist interpretation of Marxism. Like Lukács, Gramsci emphasizes Marx’s intellectual debt to Hegel. He argues that Marx transcends both traditional materialism and idealism by developing a "philosophy of praxis." Gramsci describes the philosophy of praxis as an "absolute historicism," emphasizing the complete secularization of thought and the human-centered nature of history.

=== The rediscovery of the early Marx ===
The first publication of Marx's Economic and Philosophic Manuscripts in 1932 greatly changed the reception of his work. Written in 1844, when Marx was twenty-five or twenty-six years old, the Manuscripts situated Marx's reading of political economy, his relationship to the philosophies of Georg Wilhelm Friedrich Hegel and Ludwig Feuerbach, and his views on communism, within a new theoretical framework. In the Manuscripts, Marx borrows philosophical terminology from Hegel and Feuerbach to posit a critique of capitalist society based in "alienation". Through his own activity, Man becomes alien from himself: to the products of his own activity, to the nature in which he lives, to other human beings, and to his human potential. The concept is not merely descriptive, it is a call for de-alienation through radical change of the world.

The immediate impact of the 1844 Manuscripts' publication was tempered by the rise of Nazism in Germany in 1933, where the work might have had its greatest reception, and by the start of Stalin’s purges in Russia in 1934. However, Lukács, who had worked under David Ryazanov in 1931 to decode the Manuscripts, later claimed that this experience permanently changed his interpretation of Marxism. The significance of the 1844 Manuscripts was at this time also recognized by Marxists such as Raya Dunayevskaya, Herbert Marcuse and Henri Lefebvre. Marcuse stated that the Manuscripts redefined the entire theory of "scientific socialism," while Lefebvre published the first translations of the Manuscripts into a foreign language, releasing a French edition with Norbert Guterman in 1933.

In the period after the Second World War, the texts of the early Marx were translated into Italian and discussed by Galvano Della Volpe. In France, they attracted the philosophers Maurice Merleau-Ponty and Jean-Paul Sartre. The influence of Marx’s early philosophical writings peaked in the late 1950s when their themes spread widely across Western Europe. In 1961, a volume of the Manuscripts containing an introduction by Erich Fromm was published in the United States.

Another significant source for Marxist humanism was Marx's Grundrisse, a 1,000 page collection of Marx's working notes for Capital. First published in Moscow in 1939, the Grundrisse became available in an accessible edition in 1953. The text provided a missing link between the Hegelian philosophical humanism of Marx’s early writings and the economics of his later work. Scholars such as Roman Rosdolsky have noted how the Grundrisse showed the ongoing influence of alienation and Hegelian dialectics in Marx’s later theories, including his magnum opus.

== Currents ==
=== France: existentialist Marxism ===
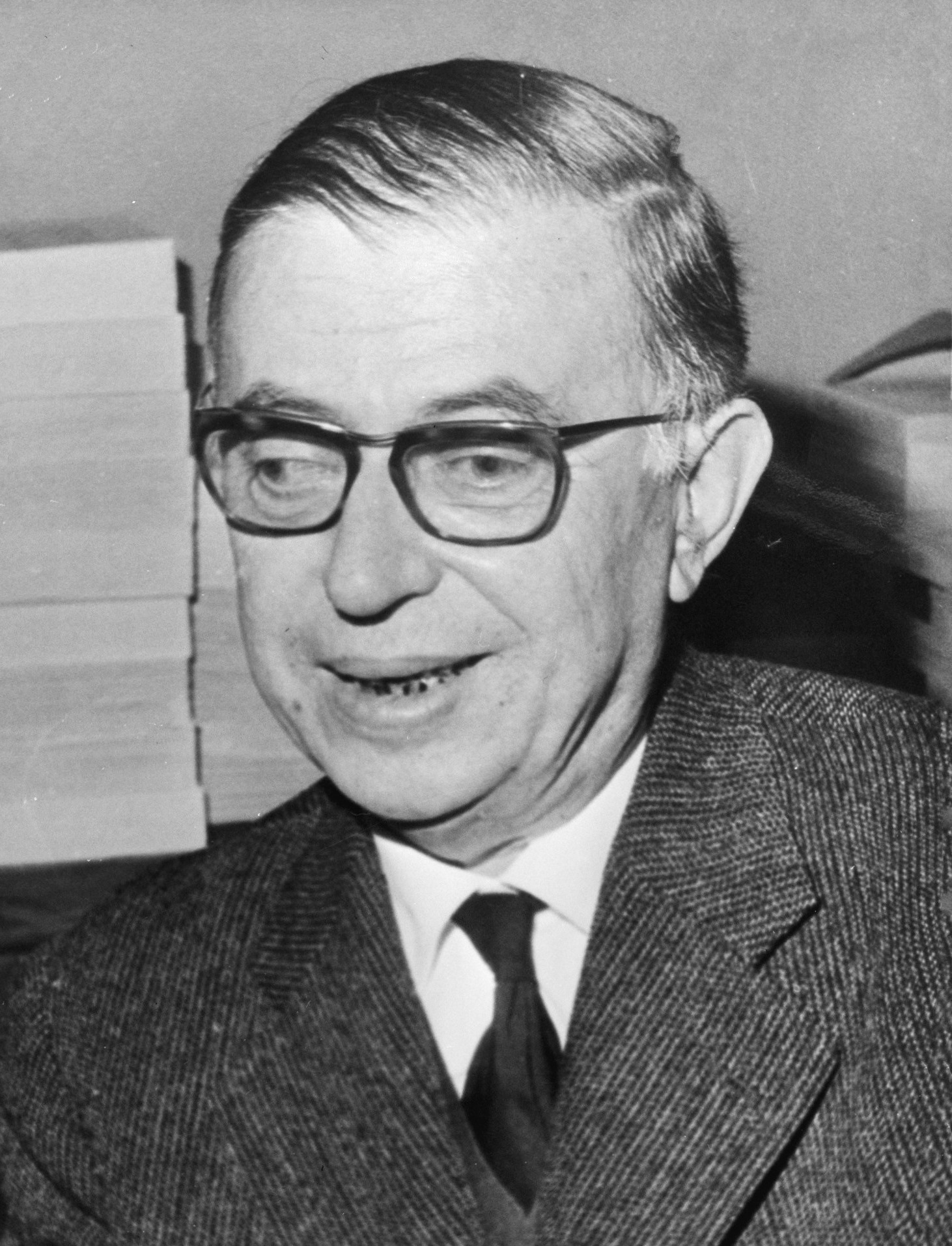
Jean-Paul Sartre

In the aftermath of the occupation of France and the Second World War, the existentialist philosophers Jean-Paul Sartre and Maurice Merleau-Ponty were among the founders of the independent leftist journal Les Temps Modernes. Shaped by their experiences in wartime and participation in the resistance, Sartre and Merleau-Ponty formulated an independent Marxism that integrated their political concerns into their philosophies. Merleau-Ponty eventually abandoned Marxism by 1955, but Sartre continued to engage with it thereafter. They rejected the deterministic and scientistic approach of Stalinism. Their Marxism instead reinterpreted the tradition as a theory rooted in human agency, creativity, and praxis. This humanist Marxism focused on the lived experiences of the oppressed, aiming to overcome the limitations of both Stalinist orthodoxy and bourgeois liberalism.

Influenced by phenomenology, Merleau-Ponty highlighted the role of human intentionality and historical practice in shaping history. He emphasized the open-ended nature of history, arguing that human agency and subjectivity prevent any guaranteed historical outcomes. His 1947 work, Humanism and Terror, defended the revolutionary aims of the working class as aligned with the broader interests of humanity. He justified Soviet repression, including the Moscow Trials, on the grounds that political actions should be judged not by liberal principles of justice but by their historical consequences. This stance reflected his belief that revolutionary violence, unlike the structural violence of capitalism, was aimed at ultimately creating a more just society. However, he later reconsidered these views, expressing skepticism about whether the proletariat would necessarily fulfill its historical role as the agent of emancipation. Merleau-Ponty retreated from his earlier justifications of Soviet policy in his book Adventures of the Dialectic (1955).

In contrast, Sartre initially maintained a "third-camp" position, which rejected alignment with either the United States or the Soviet Union. However, by the early 1950s, in response to the Cold War and the Korean War, he shifted towards a more favorable view of the Soviet Union, believing it represented a force for peace. This growing divergence in their perspectives led to a break between Sartre and Merleau-Ponty, culminating in Merleau-Ponty's resignation from Les Temps modernes in 1952.

Sartre adapted his existentialist philosophy to Marxism. He emphasized human freedom and subjectivity as central to the making of human history. Despite his support of the Soviet Union, he criticized Stalinist Marxism's "iron laws", economic determinism, and the bureaucratic tendencies of Soviet socialism. Sartre introduced concepts such as "fused groups" (spontaneous, collective revolutionary action) and "organized group practice" (sustained communal efforts), which reflected a dynamic view of human agency within historical processes.

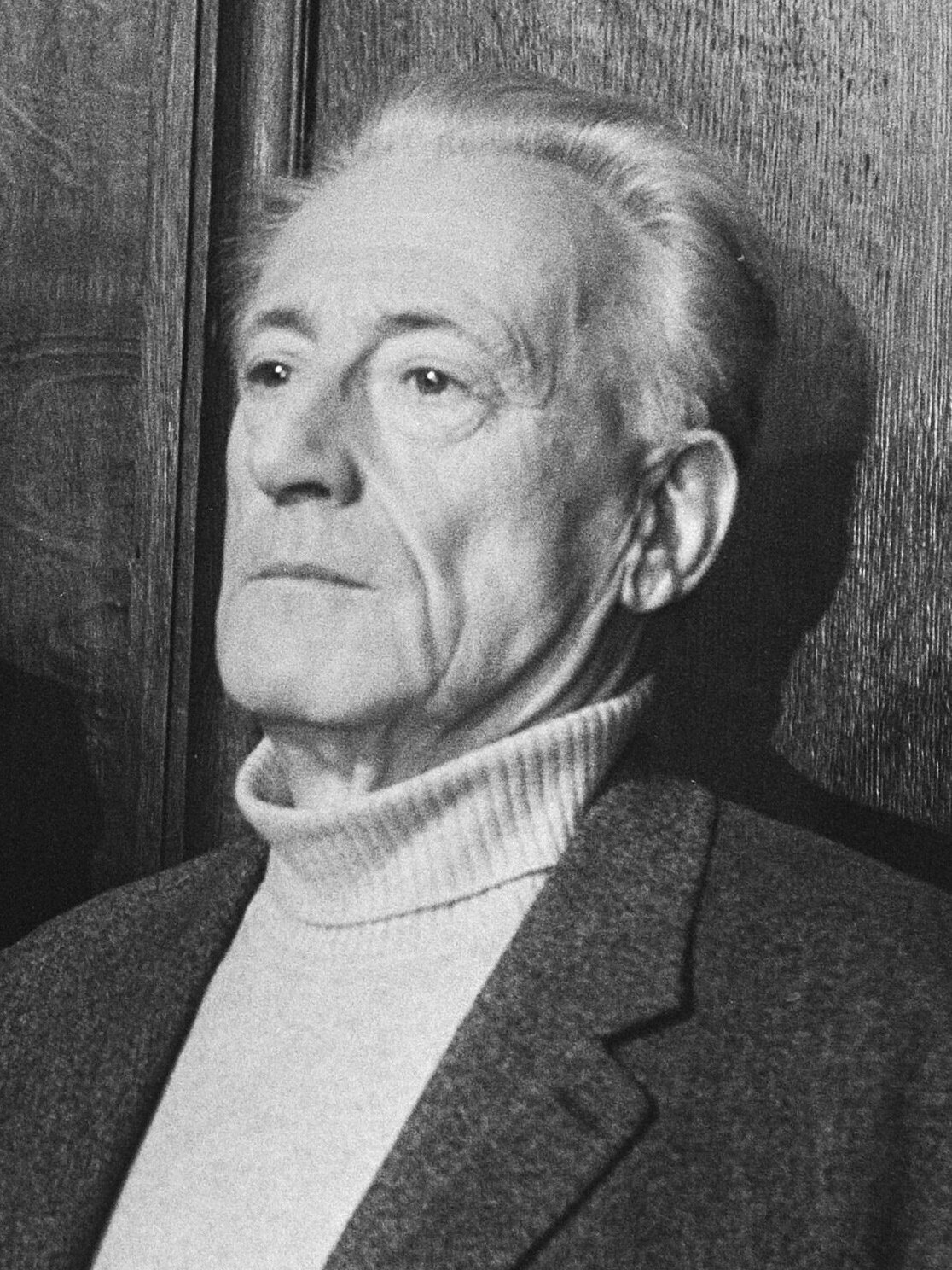
Henri Lefebvre

In 1939, Henri Lefebvre, then a member of the French Communist Party (PCF), published a brief study of Marxist philosophy, Dialectical Materialism. In this work, Lefebvre argued that the Marxist dialectic is based on the concepts of alienation and praxis, rather than the "Dialectics of Nature" found in Friedrich Engels's writings. Lefebvre drew heavily from the recently published 1844 Manuscripts, which he was the first to translate into French.

However, it was not until 1956, following the Soviet suppression of the Hungarian Uprising, that French Communist Party dissidents openly challenged the Marxist orthodoxy. The journal Arguments , edited by Lefebvre, Edgar Morin, Jean Duvignaud, Kostas Axelos, and Pierre Fougeyrollas - all former or current members of the PCF - was created that same year. The journal became a focal point for a new Marxist humanist critique of Stalinism.

The 1844 Manuscripts became a central reference for the journal, and existentialism had a significant influence on its approach. Lefebvre, for instance, looked to Sartre for a theory of alienation under capitalism. Lefebvre argued that alienation encompassed not only labor, but also consumerism, culture, systems of meaning, and language within capitalist society. Other members of the Arguments group were influenced by Martin Heidegger's critique of Western metaphysics. Kostas Axelos and Pierre Fougeyrollas followed Heidegger in viewing Marxism as flawed by its traditional metaphysical assumptions.

Starting in the late 1950s, Roger Garaudy, for many years the chief philosophical spokesman of the French Communist Party, offered a humanistic interpretation of Marx stemming from Marx's early writings which called for dialogue between Communists and existentialists, phenomenologists and Christians.

=== Eastern Europe: revisionism and dissent ===
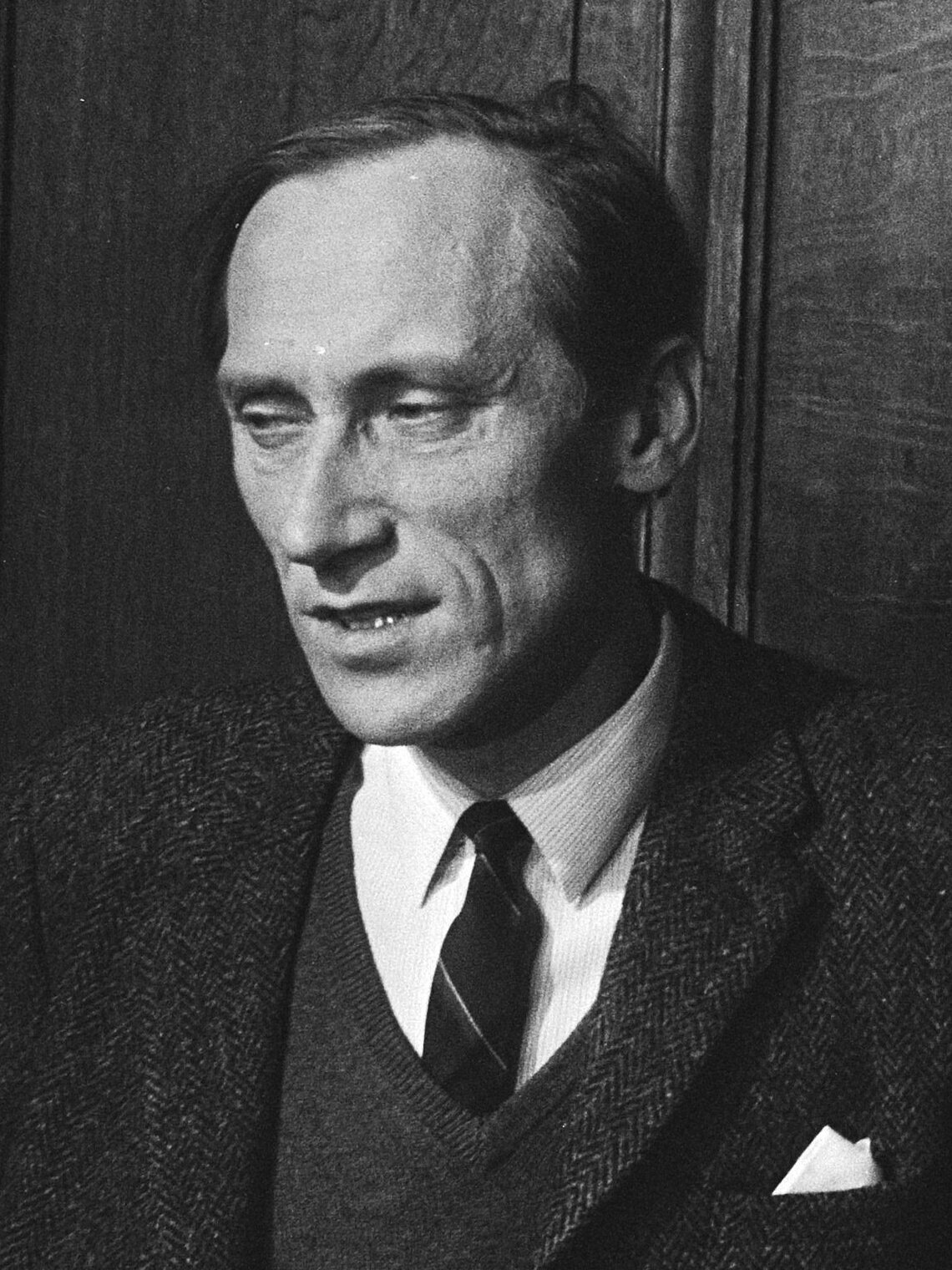
Leszek Kołakowski

The decade following Joseph Stalin's death in 1953 witnessed various movements for liberalization across Eastern Europe framed under the banner of "humanism." Socialist humanism was at first condemned as "revisionist," but by the 1960s official Communist parties had adopted the label themselves, professing a belief in "Everything for Man."

The revival of Marxist humanism was particularly influenced by Nikita Khrushchev's denunciation of Stalinism in 1956, which was significant in creating an environment receptive to change. After 1956, Marx's 1844 Manuscripts became a cornerstone for opposition to Stalinism in Eastern Europe. This usage has been compared to the way the New Testament inspired reformers during the Reformation. In Hungary, Poland, Yugoslavia, and Czechoslovakia, a new "socialist humanist" movement emerged, which combined grassroots demands for workers' control with the philosophical insights of early Marxist texts."

During this period:

- Yugoslav philosophers Mihailo Marković and Gajo Petrović formulated a humanist Marxism that later became the basis of the Praxis school. From 1964 to 1975, this group published a philosophical journal, Praxis, and organized annual philosophical debates on the island of Korčula. They concentrated on themes such as alienation, reification and bureaucracy.
- Leszek Kołakowski, a philosopher at Warsaw University, established himself as a voice of Polish "revisionism." His essays, such as "What is Socialism?" and "The End of the Age of Myths", articulated a critique of Stalinism that affirmed a commitment to a more democratic and human-centered socialism. His 1957 work "Responsibility and History" further advanced these ideas, arguing that socialism should be reimagined as a system that prioritizes individual autonomy and human dignity, rather than bureaucratic control.
- Czechoslovak philosopher Karel Kosík published Dialectics of the Concrete in 1961, advocating individual agency and the "human personality" in history — a stance that eventually led to his imprisonment.

=== Britain: the New Left ===
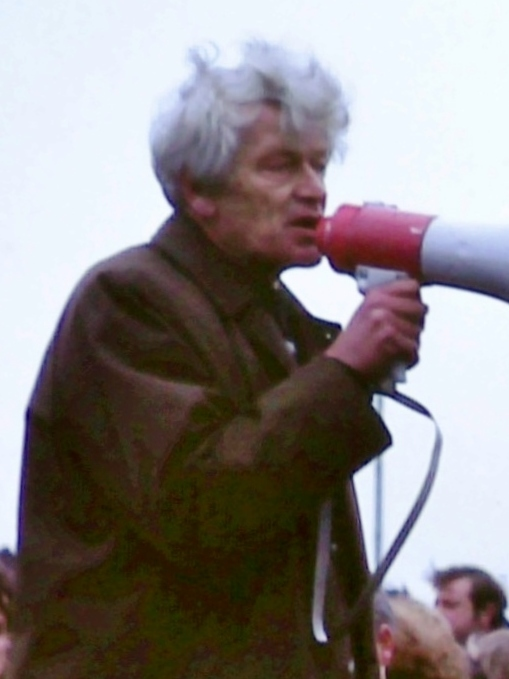
E. P. Thompson

Marxist humanism played a key role in the emergence of the British New Left in the late 1950s, particularly through the efforts of dissident intellectuals such as E. P. Thompson and John Saville. In response to Khrushchev's revelations about Stalinism and the Soviet Union's suppression of the Hungarian Uprising of 1956, both historians left the Communist Party of Great Britain (CPGB) and founded The Reasoner, a critical inner-party journal that soon evolved into The New Reasoner. This journal became a central platform for advocating participatory democracy, opposing the Cold War, and challenging both U.S. and Soviet imperialism, while articulating a vision of democratic socialism rooted in humanist values.

In 1957, Thompson published his seminal essay, "Socialist Humanism: An Epistle to the Philistines", in The New Reasoner, arguing that Soviet Marxism had become rigid and abstract, detached from the actual experiences and struggles of real men and women. He critiqued the dogmatism of Communist orthodoxy and called for a Marxism that placed human needs, agency, and moral considerations at its core. This perspective strongly resonated with young intellectuals who were disillusioned with both Stalinism and Western capitalism, helping to shape a distinctly British socialist humanist tradition.

The British New Left coalesced around The New Reasoner and the Universities and Left Review, a journal founded by younger radical intellectuals who focused more on cultural transformation and issues of racial and ethnic identity. These two groups merged in 1959 to form the New Left Review. However, tensions between the labor movement-oriented socialist humanists (led by Thompson) and the theory-driven editorial direction of Perry Anderson led to Thompson's departure from the New Left Review in 1962. This marked a shift away from socialist humanism within the journal, prompting Thompson and others to establish the Socialist Register in 1964, which continued to champion a humanist Marxism.

Despite the fragmentation of the New Left, Thompson's humanist Marxism remained a significant force in British intellectual life. Particularly influential were his historical work (The Making of the English Working Class, 1963), his critique of Althusserian structuralism (The Poverty of Theory, 1978), and his anti-nuclear activism during the 1980s. Thompson's critique of Althusser rejected the reduction of individuals to passive elements within a system - the belief that individuals were merely "carriers of class relations." Thompson instead maintained that history is shaped by collective human struggle, believing that Marxist theory must prioritize historical agency and lived experience.

=== The Frankfurt School: critical theory ===
The Frankfurt School emerged from the Institute for Social Research in Frankfurt am Main in 1923. The school developed a philosophical approach called critical theory that sought to integrate Marxist critique with insights from psychoanalysis, sociology, and cultural analysis. Key figures such as Max Horkheimer, Theodor Adorno, Herbert Marcuse, and later Jürgen Habermas, aimed to analyze the conditions that maintained social domination and impeded human emancipation.

The Frankfurt School expanded the scope of Marxist critique to include the role of culture, ideology, and mass communication in sustaining capitalist domination. Adorno and Horkheimer's Dialectic of Enlightenment (1944) argued that the Enlightenment's rationalist ideals had been co-opted into forms of instrumental reason that reinforced totalitarian tendencies within both capitalist and authoritarian socialist societies. This pessimistic view of modernity led them to question the prospects for human emancipation through revolutionary praxis.

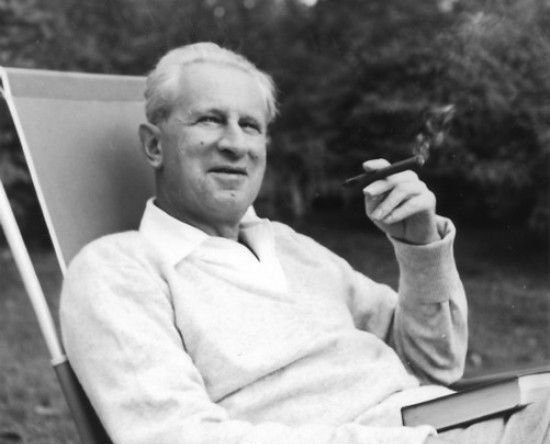
Herbert Marcuse

In contrast, Marcuse maintained a more optimistic stance. In Reason and Revolution (1941), he argued for the inherently critical and revolutionary nature of Hegel's dialectic. Marcuse believed that Hegelian philosophy could expose the contradictions within capitalism and serve to underpin transformative praxis. His later works Eros and Civilization (1955) and One-Dimensional Man (1964) critiqued consumer culture and technological rationality in advanced capitalist societies. Marcuse also identified new revolutionary subjects beyond the working class who were the focus of classical Marxism, such as students, intellectuals, and other marginalized groups. His ideas, which emphasized personal liberation, direct political action, and critiques of bureaucratic rationality, were influential within the New Left in the 1960s. Nevertheless, he remained skeptical about the feasibility of a humanist socialist society in an era of advanced technological control.

The Frankfurt School shared key affinities with Marxist humanism. However, the school's engagement with Marxist humanism was ambivalent. While they rejected the crude economic determinism of Soviet Marxism, they also critiqued the abstract humanism of thinkers like Feuerbach and those Marxists who, in their view, underestimated the role of social structures in shaping human consciousness. Instead of positing an essentialist notion of human nature, critical theorists argued that subjectivity itself was historically conditioned and mediated by ideology, culture, and power relations.

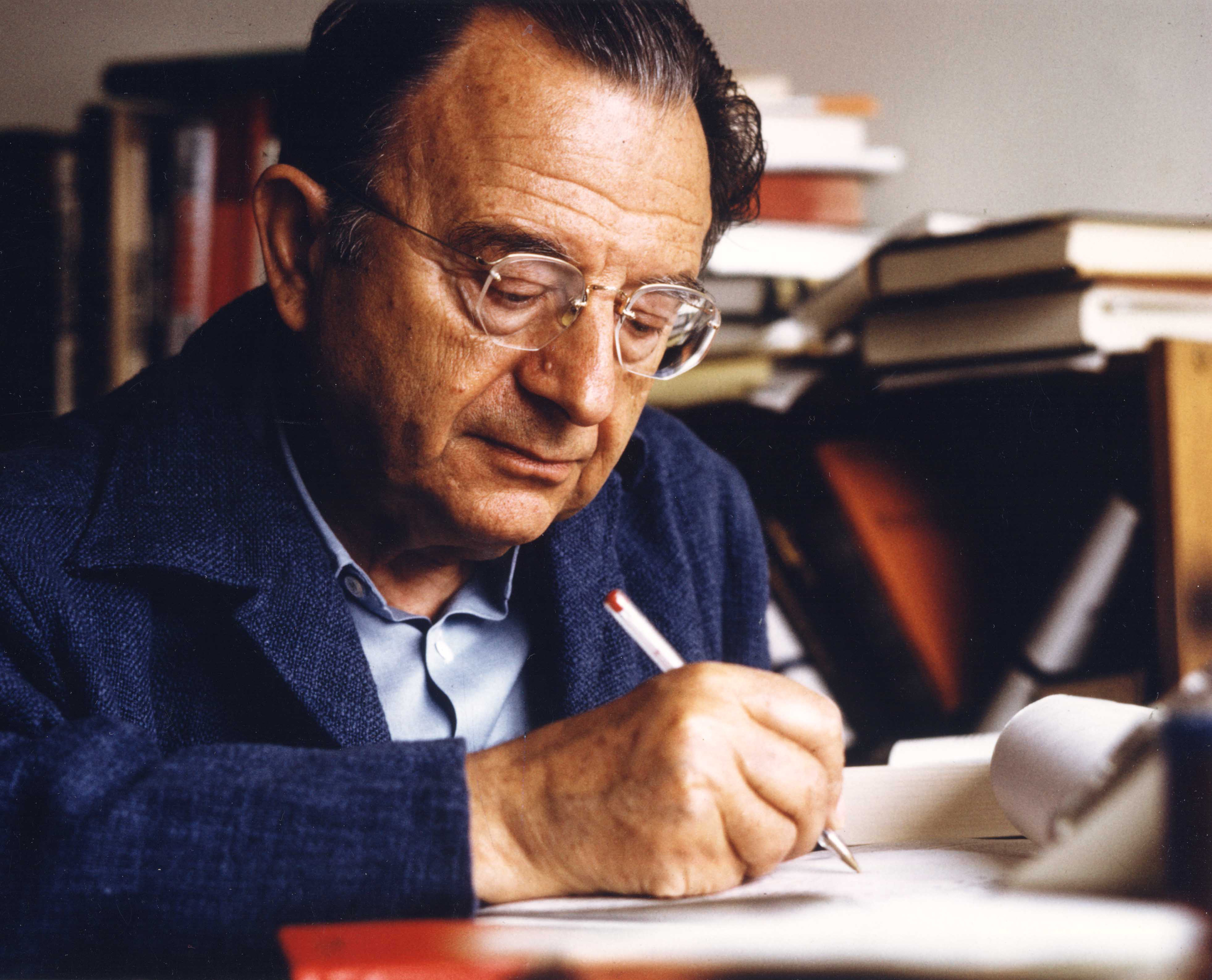
Erich Fromm

Erich Fromm was the most explicitly humanist associate of the Frankfurt School. Fromm was one of the most influential proponents of Marxist humanism in the United States. He emphasized alienation as a central issue of capitalist society and framed his critique of capitalism through a psychological and humanistic lens. His 1965 edited collection, Socialist Humanism: An International Symposium, sought to strengthen international networks of socialist/Marxist humanists. Fromm argued that love, solidarity, and cooperative social relationships were fundamental human needs frustrated by capitalist structures. In The Sane Society (1955), he called for a decentralized socialist society based on workers' participation and democratic cooperation, aligning his vision with Marx's concept of a stateless, egalitarian society. Although often perceived as a liberal or social democrat, Fromm was firmly rooted in Marxist thought, maintaining that socialism should be deeply humanistic rather than authoritarian. His political engagement extended beyond theory — he was actively involved in the peace movement, particularly as a founder of the Committee for a Sane Nuclear Policy. Through both his scholarship and activism, Fromm contributed significantly to the reorientation of Marxism toward a democratic and human-centered socialism.

=== The Johnson–Forest Tendency ===
The Johnson–Forest Tendency was a dissident Marxist current within Trotskyism, led by C. L. R. James (pseudonym: Johnson) and Raya Dunayevskaya (pseudonym: Forest), with Grace Lee Boggs playing a significant role. Emerging from debates within the Socialist Workers Party (SWP) and later the Workers Party in the United States, the group rejected traditional Leninist vanguardism and, in the 1940s, developed a theory of state capitalism, arguing that the Soviet Union was not a "degenerated workers' state" but rather a bureaucratic form of capitalist society. A major intellectual influence on the group was Dunayevskaya's reading of Marx's Economic and Philosophic Manuscripts of 1844. This perspective led the tendency to align closely with Marxist humanism.

In 1955, following James's departure to England, the group splintered. Dunayevskaya and her followers formed the News and Letters Committees, explicitly advancing Marxist humanist thought. James and Grace Lee continued the Correspondence Publishing Committee, later publishing Facing Reality (1958), a work inspired by the Hungarian Uprising of 1956 that called for workers' self-management as the foundation for socialism. Their approach anticipated later movements that emphasized direct democracy, rejecting not only Stalinist and Trotskyist party structures but political parties in general.

=== China ===
The core text of Marxist humanism, Marx's Economic and Philosophical Manuscripts of 1844, was first published in China through the 1979 Chinese edition of the Marx/Engels Collected Works. Zhu Guangqian was one of the earliest post-Cultural Revolution Chinese proponents of Marxist humanism.

In February 1983, Zhou Yang, president of the China Federation of Literary and Art Circles, and three younger intellectuals—Wang Ruoshui, Gu Xiang, and Wang Yuanhua—coauthored "Discussion on Several Theoretical Issues of Marxism" for a Central Party School conference. Its section on "Marxism and humanism" became the manifesto of Chinese Marxist humanism. This resulted in a rebuttal from Party theoretician Hu Qiaomu. Zhou and his coauthors contended that Marxism developed through humanism, while Hu opposed that position as a bourgeois distortion. The debate revealed a deeper divide: whether the absence of humanism in China signified Marxism's fulfillment or its failure. Following the controversy, Wang and People's Daily's president Hu Jiwei were removed, and the 1983 Anti–Spiritual Pollution campaign soon turned a philosophical debate into a larger conservative movement against reformist and humanist currents in Chinese intellectual life.

== Philosophy ==
Marxist humanism opposes the philosophy of "dialectical materialism" that was orthodox among the Soviet-aligned Communist Parties. Following Friedrich Engels's Anti-Dühring, where Engels marries Georg Wilhelm Friedrich Hegel's dialectics to philosophical materialism, the Soviets saw Marxism as a theory not just of society but of reality as a whole. Engels's book is a work of what he calls "natural philosophy", and not one of science. Nonetheless, he claims that discoveries within the sciences tend to confirm the scientific nature of his theory. This world-view is instantiated within both the natural and social sciences. For dialectical materialism, Marxist theory will eventually lose its philosophical character and be absorbed into fully developed theoretical natural science.

Marxist humanists reject the idea that society can be understood with the same methods of the natural sciences, and they are critical of science and technology themselves, believing these serve as instruments of control and manipulation. Marxist humanism asserts the centrality and distinctiveness of people and society. Social science differs from natural science because people and society are not instantiations of universal natural processes, as in the view of dialectical materialism. People are not objects but subjects – centers of consciousness and values – and science is an embedded part of the totalizing perspective of humanist philosophy.

Whereas dialectical materialism sees Marxist theory as primarily scientific, Marxist humanism views Marxist theory as primarily philosophical. Marxist humanism echoes earlier cultural trends, particularly the Romantic reaction against Enlightenment rationalism, and draws heavily from the German idealist traditions, including the works of Kant, Hegel, and hermeneutic philosophy. These traditions reject the empiricist idea of a unified scientific methodology. Instead, they argue that human social practice has a purposive, transformative character, and thus requires a mode of understanding different from the detached, empirical observation of the natural sciences. This understanding is not about causal explanation but rather interpreting meaning — particularly the language, ideas, and cultural practices of a society. Participants' understanding of their own language and society is seen as an essential insight that no empirical external science can replace. A theoretical understanding of society should therefore be based in empathy with or participation in the social activities it investigates.

=== Alienation ===
In line with this, Marxist humanism treats alienation as Marxism's central concept. In his early writings, the young Marx advances a critique of modern society on the grounds that it impedes human flourishing. Marx's theory of alienation suggests a dysfunctional or hostile relation between entities that naturally belong in harmony – an artificial separation of one entity from another with which it had been previously and properly conjoined. The concept has "subjective" and "objective" variants. Alienation is "subjective" when human individuals feel "estranged" or do not feel at home in the modern social world. Alienation is objective when individuals are hindered from developing their essential human capacities. For Marx, subjective alienation flows from objective alienation: individuals experience their lives as lacking meaning or fulfilment because society does not promote the deployment of their human capacities.

Marxist humanism views alienation as the guiding idea of both Marx's early writings and his later works. According to this school of thought, the central concepts of Capital cannot be fully and properly understood without reference to this seminal theme. Communism is not merely a new socioeconomic formation that will supersede the present one, but the re-appropriation of Man's life and the abolition of alienation.

==== In the young Marx ====
===== The modern state: civil society and political society =====
The earliest appearance of the concept of alienation in Marx's corpus is the Critique of Hegel's Philosophy of Right from 1843. Marx here discusses the modern state. For Marx, the modern state is characterized by an historically unprecedented separation between an individual's "real" life in civil society from his "political" life as a citizen of the state. This contrasts with the ancient and medieval worlds, where civil and political life formed a unity.

Marx argues that the modern social world could not exist where commerce and property were still tied to the common good. The modern social world was born when the private sphere achieved an independent existence, and the substantive unity between the political and civil realms was broken. He believes this separation was completed with the French Revolution in 1789. The old estates were here transformed into social classes, making class distinctions in civil society "merely social differences" of no practical significance in political life.

The relationship between the state and civil society is not harmonious. The two spheres embody distinct and conflicting principles: the state represents the general interest (the common good), while civil society manifests the system of particular interests (individual and private concerns). These heterogeneous spheres are antithetical - their different guiding principles oppose one another, creating an antagonism.

Modern civil society, driven by individual self-interest and the pursuit of private property, fragments society and alienates individuals from one another. Marx describes civil society as "atomistic," a concept meant to convey unimpeded individualism. This individualism, carried to its logical conclusion, means that particular, private interests become the ultimate goal of modern social life. Civil society is incapable of sustaining the communal dimension of human flourishing.

While the modern state claims to represent the common good, it is distinguished by its remoteness from the life of ordinary citizens. Marx refers to this as a "transcendental remoteness" or "ethereal region." This abstraction leads to a political sphere where matters of universal concern are decided "without having become the real concern of the people." The state lacks tangible connection to citizens' daily lives. While the state acknowledges the communal dimension of human flourishing, it does so in an inadequate manner. Individuals participate in this "heaven" of the political state as abstract citizens, separated from their concrete existence in civil society.

===== Bauer's critique of religion =====
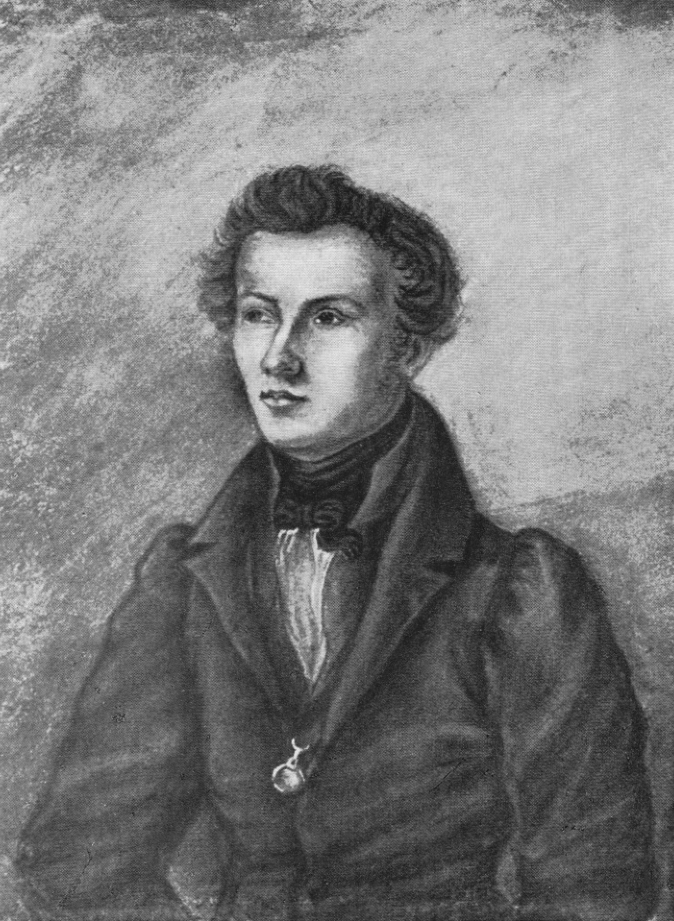
Bruno Bauer

The most well-known metaphor in Marx's Critique – religion as the opium of the people – is derived from the writings of the Young Hegelian theologian Bruno Bauer. Bauer's primary concern is religious alienation. Bauer views religion as a division in Man's consciousness. Man suffers from the illusion that religion exists apart from and independent of his own consciousness, and that he himself is dependent on his own creation. Religious beliefs become opposed to consciousness as a separate power. Self-consciousness makes itself into an object, a thing, loses control of itself, and feels itself to be nothing before an imagined opposing power. Religious consciousness, Bauer argues, depends on this internal rupture: religion strips human beings of their own attributes and projects those attributes into a heavenly world.

Since religious belief is the work of a divided mind, it stands in contradiction to itself: the Gospels contradict both with one another and with the empirical world; their dogmas are so far removed from common sense that they can be understood only as mysteries. The God that men worship is a subhuman God – their own imaginary, inflated and distorted reflection.

For Bauer, history reflects the self-consciousness of the historical Spirit, with empirical reality serving as a resistance Spirit must overcome. Bauer sees Christianity as a stage of self-consciousness that projected human values into myths, creating a new form of servitude by subordinating individuals to God. He argues that Christianity, rooted more in Roman culture than Jewish tradition, alienated humanity from its essence. The task of the current historical phase, Bauer claims, is to liberate humanity from religious mythology and separate the state from religion.

In the Critique, Marx adopts Bauer's criticism of religion and applies this method to other fields. Marx conceives of human alienations as successive layers surrounding a genuine core. Religion is the most extreme form of alienation: it is at once both the symptom of a deep social malaise and a protest against this malaise. Consequently, the criticism of religion leads to the criticism of other alienations, which must be dealt with in the same way. Bauer's influence remains evident throughout Marx’s later work, particularly in Marx's frequent use of religious analogies to illuminate economic relations.

===== Hegel's philosophy of law and history =====
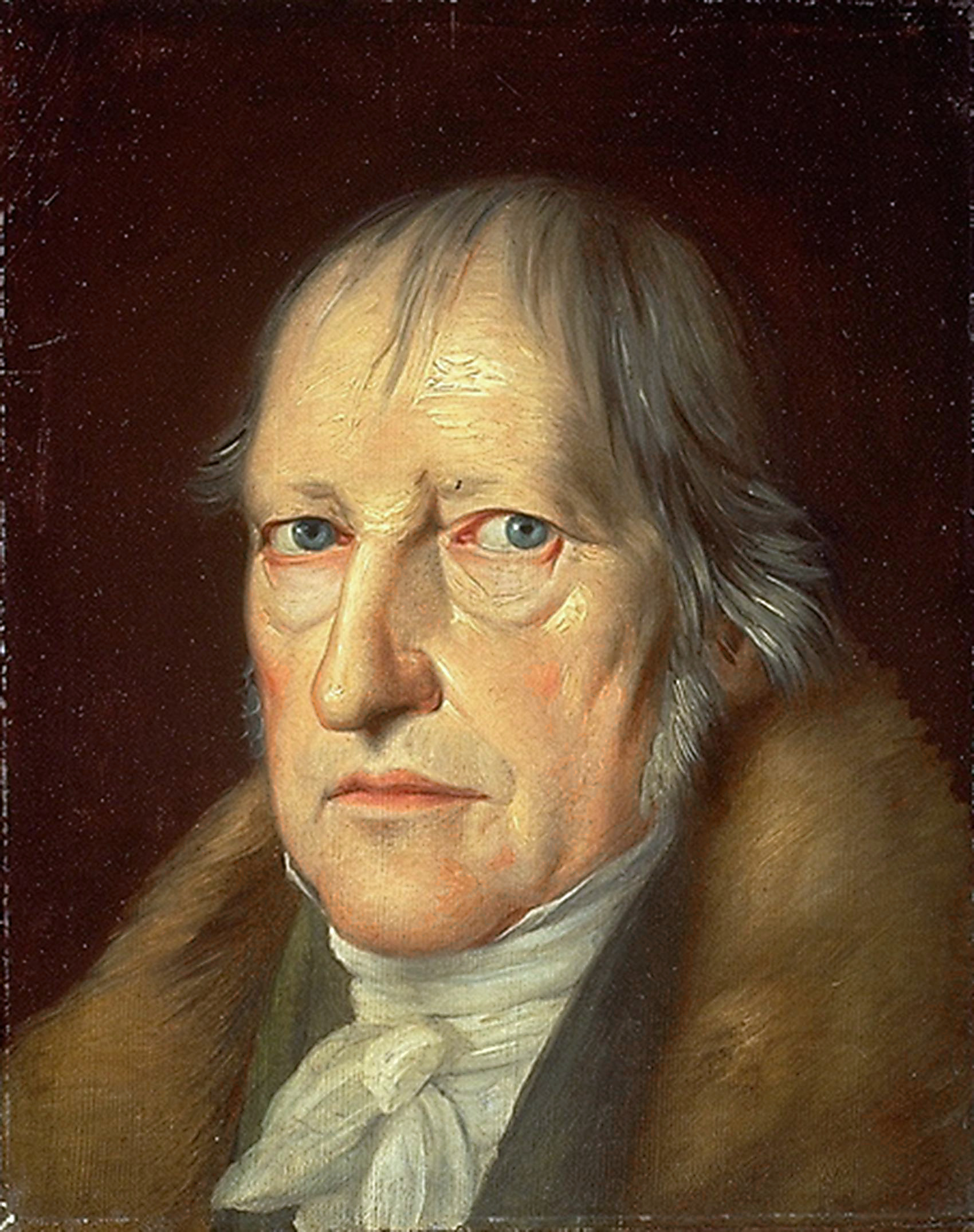
G. W. F. Hegel

The Critique of Hegel's Philosophy of Right credits Georg Wilhelm Friedrich Hegel with significant insight into both the basic structure of the modern social world and its disfigurement by alienation. Hegel believes alienation will no longer exist when the social world objectively facilitates the self-realization of human individuals, and human individuals subjectively understand that this is so.

For Hegel, objective alienation is already non-existent, as the institutions of the modern social world – the family, civil society, and the political state – facilitate the fulfilment of human individuals, both as individuals and members of a community. In spite of this, modern people still find themselves in a state of widespread subjective alienation. Hegel wishes not to reform or change the institutions of the modern social world, but to change the way in which society is understood by its members. Marx shares Hegel's belief that subjective alienation is widespread, but denies that the institutions of the rational or modern state enable individuals to actualize themselves. Marx instead takes widespread subjective alienation to indicate that objective alienation has not been overcome.

Marx further develops his critique of Hegel in the Economic and Philosophic Manuscripts of 1844. Marx here praises Hegel's dialectic for its view of labor as an alienating process: alienation is an historical stage that must be passed through for the development and deployment of essential human powers. It is an essential characteristic of finite mind (Man) to produce things, to express itself in objects, to objectify itself in physical things, social institutions and cultural products. Every objectification is of necessity an instance of alienation: the produced objects become alien to the producer. Humanity creates itself by externalizing its own essence, developing through a process of alienation alternating with transcendence of that alienation. Man externalizes his essential powers in an objectified state, and then assimilates them back into him from outside.

For Hegel, alienation is the state of consciousness as it acquaints itself with the external, objective, phenomenal world. Hegel believes that reality is Spirit realizing itself. Spirit's existence is constituted only in and through its own productive activity. In the process of realizing itself, Spirit produces a world that it initially believes to be external, but gradually comes to understand is its own production.

A fundamental idea in Hegel's philosophy is that all that exists, everything, is the Absolute Spirit (Absolute Mind, Absolute Idea or God). The Absolute is not a static or timeless entity but a dynamic Self, engaged in a cycle of alienation and de-alienation. Spirit becomes alienated from itself in nature and returns from its self-alienation through the finite Mind, Man. Human history is a process of de-alienation, consisting in the constant growth of Man's knowledge of the Absolute. Conversely, human history is also the development of the Absolute's knowledge of itself: the Absolute becomes self-aware through Man. Man is a natural being and is thus a self-alienated Spirit. But Man is also a historical being, who can achieve adequate knowledge of the Absolute, and is thus capable of becoming a de-alienated being.

Marx criticizes Hegel for understanding labor as "abstract mental labour". Hegel equates Man with self-consciousness and sees alienation as constituted by objectivity. Consciousness emancipates itself from alienation by overcoming objectivity, recognizing that what appears as an external object is a projection of consciousness itself. Hegel understands that the objects which appear to order men's lives – their religion, their wealth – in fact belong to Man and are the product of essential human capacities. Hegel sees freedom as the aim of human history. He believes freedom to consist in men's becoming fully self-conscious, understanding that their environment and culture are emanations from Spirit. Marx rejects the notion of Spirit, believing that Man's ideas, though important, are by themselves insufficient to explain social and cultural change. In Hegel, Man's integration with nature takes place on a spiritual level and is thus, in Marx's view, an abstraction and an illusion.

===== Feuerbach and the human essence =====
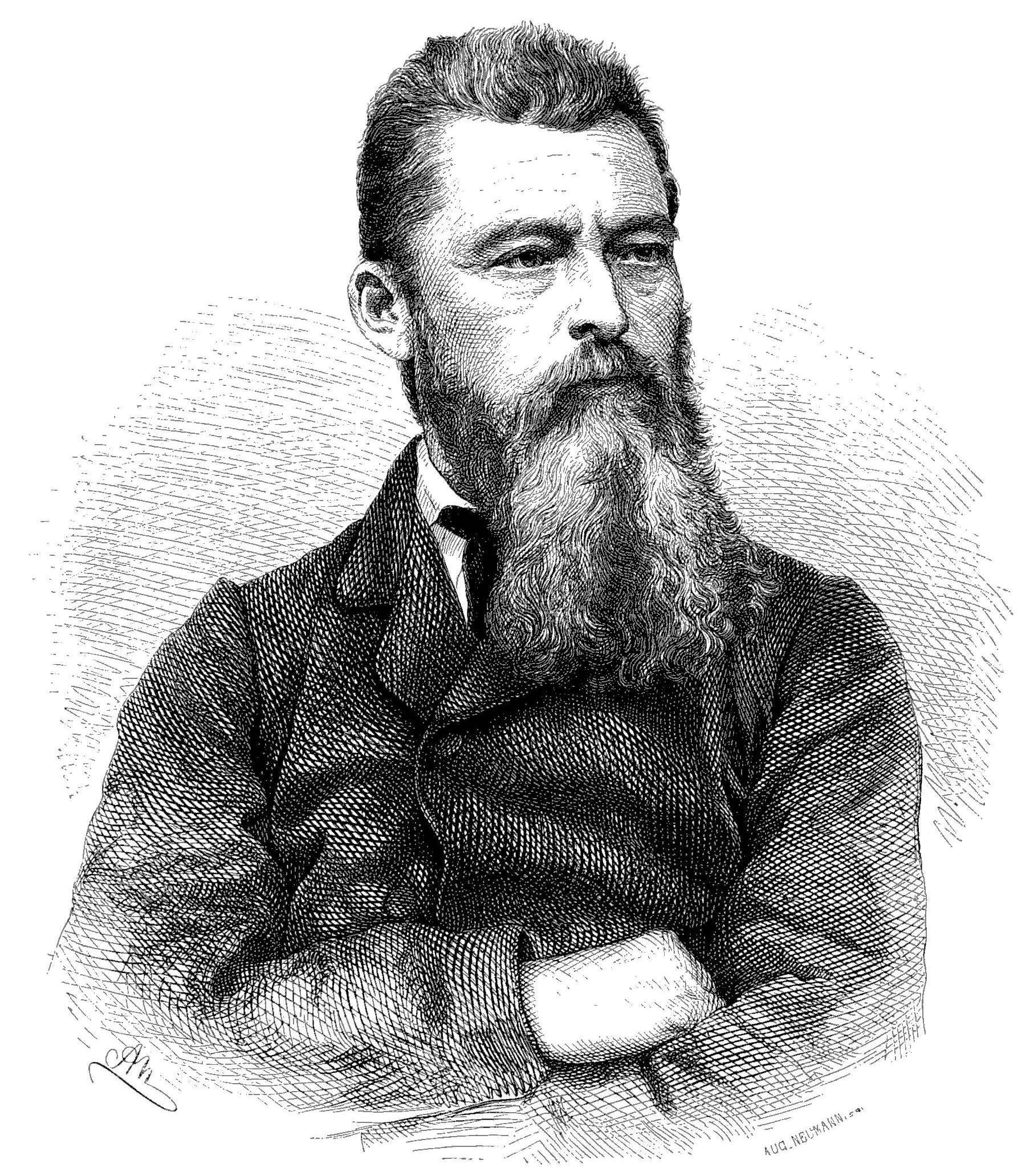
Ludwig Feuerbach

The main influence on Marx's thinking in this regard is Ludwig Feuerbach, who in his Essence of Christianity aims to overcome an inappropriate separation of individuals from their essential human nature. Feuerbach believes modern individuals are alienated by their holding false beliefs about God. According to Feuerbach, what people perceive as an objective divine being is, in reality, a man-made projection of their own essential predicates. He argues that theology is essentially anthropology — everything people say about God is a reflection of their own nature. Religion, he claims, mystifies human qualities, and when understood truthfully, religion leads to atheism and the affirmation of humanity.

For Feuerbach, Man is not a self-alienated God; God is self-alienated Man. God is Man's essence abstracted, absolutized and estranged from Man. Man creates the idea of God by gathering the best features of his human nature – his goodness, knowledge and power – glorifying them, and projecting them into an imagined realm beyond. Man’s alienation arises not from failing to recognize nature as a manifestation of God, but from creating and subordinating himself to an imagined higher being. In this process, Man becomes a slave to his own creation.

Religion, Feuerbach argues, impoverishes humanity. By transferring human intellectual and emotional capacities onto a divine being, religion diminishes human self-worth. The more qualities Man ascribes to God, the more humanity is devalued. This process is symbolized in rituals like blood sacrifices, where human life is degraded to glorify the divine. Furthermore, religion undermines social harmony by diverting love and solidarity away from people and toward God. It promotes egoism, diminishes the value of earthly life, and obstructs social equality and cooperation. Liberation will come when people recognize what God really is and, through a community that subjects human essence to no alien limitation, reclaim the goodness, knowledge and power they have projected heavenward.

In the Essence of Christianity, Feuerbach applies Hegel’s concept of alienation to religion, but he interprets alienation differently. While Hegel sees alienation as a necessary stage in the development of self-consciousness and the Absolute, Feuerbach views it as entirely negative, a destructive division that undermines humanity.

Feuerbach's critique extends beyond religion to Hegel’s philosophy itself. He criticizes Hegel for making nature secondary to Spirit. In his Theses on the Reform of Philosophy, Feuerbach claims that Hegelian philosophy is itself alienated. Hegel regards alienation as affecting thought or consciousness and not humanity in its material being. For Hegel, concrete, finite existence is merely a reflection of a system of thought or consciousness. Hegel starts and ends with the infinite. The finite, Man, is present as only a phase in the evolution of a human spirit, the Absolute. Hegel's speculative philosophy obscures the human origins of philosophical ideas, mirroring the alienation caused by religion. To overcome this, philosophy must start not with the Absolute but with the essence of Man.

Feuerbach argues that Man is alienated because he mediates a direct relationship of sensuous intuition to concrete reality through constructs like religion and philosophy. He proposes that by recognizing humanity’s immediate unity with nature, individuals can overcome alienation. This recognition would lead to what Feuerbach called "positive humanism" - a deep affirmation of humanity’s direct, sensuous engagement with the world that is more than a mere rejection of religion.

===== Estranged labor =====
Following Feuerbach, Marx places the earthly reality of Man in the center of the picture. Where Hegel sees labor as spiritual activity, Marx sees labor as physical interchange with nature: in nature, Man creates himself and creates nature. Where Hegel identifies human essence with self-consciousness, Marx articulates a concept of species-being (Gattungswesen), according to which Man's essential nature is that of a free producer, freely reproducing his own conditions of life.

Man's nature is to be his own creator, to form and develop himself by working on and transforming the world outside him in cooperation with his fellow men. Man should be in control of this process but in modern conditions Man has lost control of his own evolution. Where land-ownership is subject to the laws of a market economy, human individuals do not fulfill themselves through productive activity. A worker's labor, his personal qualities of muscle and brain, his abilities and aspirations, his sensuous life-activity, appear to him as things, commodities to be bought and sold like any other. Marx likens this alienation to the dependency created by religion. Just as Bauer and Feuerbach argue that religion alienates Man by making him subservient to an invented deity, Marx claims that the modern economic system alienates humans by reducing them to mere commodities. In religion, God holds the initiative and Man is in a state of dependence. In economics, money moves humans around as though they were objects instead of the reverse.

Marx claims that human individuals are alienated in four ways:

1. From their products
2. From their productive activity
3. From other individuals
4. From their own nature.

Firstly, the product of a worker's labor confronts him "as an alien object that has power over him". A worker has bestowed life on an object that now confronts him as hostile and alien. The worker creates an object, which appears to be his property. However, he now becomes its property. When he externalizes his life in an object, a worker's life belongs to the object and not to himself; his nature becomes the attribute of another person or thing. Where in earlier historical epochs, one person ruled over another, now the thing rules over the person, the product over the producer.

Secondly, the worker relates to the process by which this product is created as something alien that does not belong to him. His work typically does not fulfill his natural talents and spiritual goals and is experienced instead as "emasculation".

Thirdly, the worker experiences mutual estrangement – alienation from other individuals. Each individual regards others as a means to his own end. Concern for others exists mainly in the form of a calculation about the effect those others have on his own narrow self-interest.

Fourthly, the worker experiences self-estrangement: alienation from his human nature. Because work is a means to survival only, the worker does not fulfill his human need for self-realization in productive activity. The worker is only at ease in his animal functions of eating, drinking and procreating. In his distinctly human functions, he is made to feel like an animal. Modern labor turns the worker's essence as a producer into something "alien".

Marx mentions four additional features of alienated labor. First is "overwork," the extensive time modern workers spend in productive activity, which Marx argues shortens lives and leads to "early death." Second is the increasingly "one-sided" development of workers, a critique of specialization and the monotonous repetitiveness of labor in the factory system. Third is the machine-like character of labor, which reduces workers both mentally and physically to the level of machines, stripping them of judgment and control. Fourth is the "idiocy and cretinism" stemming from work’s neglect of mental skills, rather than formal intelligence.

In addition to critiquing alienated labor, Marx offers a glimpse of unalienated labor, particularly in the Notes on James Mill. Here, Marx imagines labor that expresses human potential and fulfillment. He identifies four dimensions of unalienated work, paralleling the four aspects of alienation.

First, the relation between the worker and the product: in unalienated labor, creations embody the worker’s talents and abilities, providing personal satisfaction. Second, the relation to the process: productive activity expresses individuality, becoming fulfilling rather than loathsome. Third, the relation to others: the worker gains satisfaction from meeting others’ needs, forming bonds of mutual recognition and acknowledgment. Finally, the relation to human nature: labor expresses universal human capacities and satisfies essential human needs, affirming our communal nature. For Marx, fully realizing human nature requires mutual interdependence.

The capitalist is also affected by the process of alienation, though differently from the worker. While the worker is reduced to an animal-like existence, the capitalist becomes an abstraction — a personification of money. His human traits are subsumed by the power of money, transforming his identity into an extension of this force.

As Marx explains:

"The stronger the power of my money, the stronger am I. The properties of money are my, the possessor’s, properties and essential powers. Therefore what I am and what I can do is by no means determined by my individuality. I am ugly, but I can buy the most beautiful woman. Which means to say that I am not ugly, for the effect of ugliness, its repelling power, is destroyed by money. As an individual, I am lame, but money procures me twenty-four legs. Consequently, I am not lame. I am a wicked, dishonest, unscrupulous and stupid individual, but money is respected, and so also is its owner. Money is the highest good, and consequently its owner is also good."

To overcome alienation and allow humankind to realize its species-being, it is not enough, as Hegel and Feuerbach believe, to simply understand alienation. It is necessary to transform the world that engenders alienation: the wage-labor system must be transcended, and the separation of the laborer from the means of labor abolished. This is not the task of a solitary philosophical critic, but of class struggle. The historic victory of capitalism in the middle of the 19th century has made alienation universal, since everything enters in to the cycle of exchange, and all value is reduced to commodity value. In a developed capitalist society, all forms of alienation are comprised in the worker's relation to production. All possibilities of the worker's very being are linked to the class struggle against capital. The proletariat, which owns nothing but its labor power, occupies a position radically different to all other classes. The liberation of the working class will therefore be the liberation of mankind.

The emancipation of workers is not merely about abolishing private property. Communism, defined as the negation of private property, takes various forms. Marx critiques early communist utopias for their primitive egalitarianism, which seeks to eliminate individuality and talent, effectively abolishing civilization. This form of communism imposes workers' current alienated condition on everyone, intensifying alienation rather than resolving it.

For communism to positively abolish private property and self-alienation, it must affirm humanity’s essence as a social being, reconciling individual and collective existence, freedom, and necessity. Marx compares this transformation to the abolition of religion: socialism transcends private property as atheism transcends religion — affirming humanity rather than merely negating ownership.

Achieving socialism requires a long and violent historical process but culminates in humanity’s complete liberation. In this state, human activity and its products affirm humanity, creating “wealthy man and wealthy human need,” where expanded needs reflect human richness. Unlike alienated labor, where growing demands deepen servitude, socialist wealth embodies the flourishing of mankind.

===== Division of labor =====
In The German Ideology (1845), Marx and his co-author Friedrich Engels identify the division of labor as the fundamental source of alienation, again placing private property as a secondary phenomenon. According to Marx, the division of labor — driven by improvements in tools — leads to commerce, which transforms Man-made objects into commodities that carry abstract exchange-value. This shift marks the beginning of alienation because people relate to products as commodities rather than as the result of human labor. From this, inequality, private property, and alienated political institutions emerge, all perpetuating the same alienating process.

Marx and Engels here emphasize that individuals often perceive social processes they have created as natural phenomena beyond their control. This perspective leads to a form of self-oppression, where people remain unaware of their role in sustaining societal structures. Unlike natural processes, these alienated social processes can be transformed through conscious human action.

A further form of alienation occurs when physical labor becomes separated from mental labor. This division encourages ideologists to believe their ideas exist independently of social needs, as though ideas have intrinsic power. The existence of such ideologists reinforces the false notion that ideas have their own inherent validity.

The German Ideology marks a departure from Feuerbach's humanism, criticizing his essentialist view of human nature and his moral critique of capitalism. Marx and Engels argue against abstract notions of "Man" and "human essence," asserting that real individuals, within specific historical contexts, are the true agents of history. They contend that previous philosophers misrepresented history as a process driven by an abstract "Man," rather than by tangible individuals shaped by material conditions.

==== In the mature Marx ====
===== Economics: the evolution of Marx's theory in the Grundrisse =====
The Grundrisse (1857–58), written in response to the global economic crisis of 1857, represents a transition from Marx's early philosophical analysis of alienation toward a more systematic economic exposition of capitalist contradictions. The Grundrisse engages with economic categories such as capital, labor, and value, but it maintains a strong focus on how these structures alienate human beings. Here, the central themes of the 1844 Manuscripts are dealt with in a much more sophisticated manner. Marx builds on his earlier conception of Man as a productive, object-creating being. The concepts found in Marx's earlier work – alienation, objectification, appropriation, Man's dialectical relationship to nature and his generic or social nature – all recur in the Grundrisse.

Marx views political economy as a reflection of the alienated consciousness of bourgeois society. Political economy mystifies human reality by transforming the production of commodities into "objective" laws which independently regulate human activity. The human subject is made into the object of his own products. A key difference between the Grundrisse and the Manuscripts is Marx's starting with an analysis of production, rather than the mechanisms of exchange. The production of objects must be emancipated from the alienated form given to it by bourgeois society. Moreover, Marx no longer says that what a worker sells is his labor, but rather his labor-power.

The discussion of alienation in the Grundrisse is also more firmly rooted in history. Marx argues that alienation did not exist in earlier periods – primitive communism – where wealth was still conceived as residing in natural objects and not man-made commodities. However, such societies lacked the creation of objects by purposive human activity. They cannot be a model for a fully-developed communism that realizes human potentiality. Capital is an alienating force, but it has fulfilled a very positive function. It has developed the productive forces enormously, has replaced natural needs by ones historically created and has given birth to a world market. Nonetheless, Marx sees capitalism as transitory: free competition will inevitably hinder the development of capitalism.

The key to understanding the ambivalent nature of capitalism is the notion of time. On the one hand, the profits of capitalism are built on the creation of surplus work-time, but on the other the wealth of capitalism has emancipated Man from manual labor and provided him increasing access to free time. Marx criticizes political economy for its division of Man's time between work and leisure. This argument misunderstands the nature of human activity. Labor is not naturally coercive. Rather, the historical conditions in which labor is performed frustrate human spontaneity. Work should not be a mere means for Man's existence, it should become the very contents of his life.

===== Property: from communal to private ownership =====
The Grundrisse also continues an extensive systematic analysis of the historical development of property forms, which Marx had previously begun in the German Ideology. He identifies tribal property as the earliest form of ownership, rooted in social organization and collective possession of land. This form of property emerges prior to permanent settlement and agriculture. As agriculture develops, primitive communal ownership fades. In the classical polis, which is based on agriculture, two types of property coexist: public ownership (res publica) and individual possession or use (usufruct).

In the Grundrisse, Marx introduces a speculative perspective on ancient tribal property, reflecting a broader theoretical continuity with insights from his earlier Critique of Hegel's Philosophy of Right (1843). He argues that tribal property originates in group cohesion, which allows collective possession of land. Even if communal land is later divided into private holdings, the existence of tribal property makes this division possible. Thus, individual property stems from common property, affirming that property arises from society rather than predating it.

===== Commodity fetishism: the illusion of value =====
To make a fetish of something, or fetishize it, is to invest it with powers it does not in itself have. The concept of fetishism originates in religion. In religious fetishism, a cultural process of thought attributes power to an object, such as an idol. Such power exists only in the realm of belief, not in reality. In Capital. Volume 1 (1867), Marx extends this idea to the economic sphere, identifying the phenomenon of "commodity fetishism". While religious fetishes entirely lack real power, an economic fetish holds genuine powers, but these powers derive from the labor and social organization underlying production. Unlike religious fetishism, where the illusion arises from thought, the illusion in commodity fetishism emerges from the external world and the production process itself, persisting even when understood rationally. Marx argues that the failure of human beings to understand their own social existence arises from the way production is organized in capitalist society.

Exchange-value is a key concept in understanding Marx's analysis of commodities. Every commodity has a dual nature: use-value (its utility) and exchange-value (its value in the market). Exchange-value is determined by the amount of socially necessary labor time required to produce a commodity, rather than its physical usefulness. Commodity fetishism describes how the exchange-value of commodities appears to come from the commodities themselves, rather than from the labor required to produce them. This illusion obscures the social relations behind the production process, giving the false impression that value is an inherent property of the object.

Commodity fetishism is unique to market economies, where the social character of labor is expressed only through exchange, not production itself. Unlike other social forms, such as feudalism or communal production, where production is directly social and relations between producers are transparent, commodity production isolates producers. Producers connect only indirectly through the exchange of commodities, which obscures the labor that creates value. This separation between production and social relations creates an alienated, illusory world where value appears to emanate from objects themselves.

The root of this fetishism lies in the specific social form of market economies. In such societies, producers do not recognize their collective authorship of value. Instead, social relations between producers are replaced by apparent relations between objects, with products acquiring a mysterious exchange-value, as though value was a natural, physical property of things. This exchange-value integrates fragmented producers in a disconnected system, regulating their lives while masking its foundation in labor. Producers lose awareness of their agency, attributing value creation to things rather than their own labor.

This process is a form of alienation. Human beings fail to see their own products for what they truly are. They unwittingly become enslaved by the power of their own creations. Things rule the men who have created them. Marx no longer uses the term "alienation", but the description of the phenomenon is the same as in his earlier works, and so is the analogy with religion that he owes to Feuerbach. Fetishism encapsulates all other forms of alienation. Political institutions develop autonomy and turn into instruments of oppression. Religious fantasies invented by the human mind similarly become autonomous. Social progress — whether in scientific advancement, labor organization, improved administration, or the increase in useful products — ultimately turns against humanity, transforming into quasi-natural forces beyond human control. Each genuine advancement appears only to deepen human subjugation.

Marx contrasts market economies with societies like feudalism, primitive communism, or a hypothetical future communist society consisting of a free association of producers. In these systems, production is inherently social, with products bearing the direct imprint of personal relationships or communal duties. In contrast, market societies rely on an illusory market mechanism to connect producers, creating a duplication of worlds where fragmented elements are unified only through alienated and surrogate forms. This alienation is central to Marx's critique of commodity production. The alienation is compounded by money, which embodies exchange-value independent of use-value. Money serves as a representation of social labor, masking the relationships between producers.

Market economies replace feudal subjugation with contractual freedoms, but this new "freedom" brings a different form of dependence - on commodities and their exchange. Bourgeois ideology celebrates liberation from feudal bonds, but it also enforces dependence on the "rule of things," where social power is derived from objects like money.

===== Commodification of labor power =====
In Marx’s analysis, productive labor, the process of shaping material objects to meet human needs, is the sole source of value. While secondary forms of capital (e.g., merchants, bankers, landowners) participate in acquiring surplus value, they do not contribute to its production. Industrial capital, including the organization of transport, uniquely creates surplus value: it converts human labor into commodities that embody exchange value. For Marx, only the labor involved in producing or transporting goods adds to society’s total value, while purely commercial activities (acts of exchange) do not.

A particular expression of alienation is the reification of labor power, in which human persons appear in the context of labor as commodities bought and sold like any other on the market according to the laws of value. The foundation of capitalist production lies in this transformation of human qualities into things. Marx argues that this epitomizes the degradation of humanity under capitalism: a worker’s labor becomes external to his life — it is a means to survive rather than an expression of self. The capitalist mode of production subjugates the worker’s life activity, transforming it into a process of generating surplus value for others.

In this system, the worker produces wealth that does not belong to him. His labor is continually transformed into capital — an alien power that dominates and exploits him. As Marx puts it, "The laborer constantly produces material wealth as capital, an alien force, while the capitalist produces labor power as a dependent and exploited resource." This dynamic perpetuates the worker’s poverty and dehumanization.

Capitalism reduces human relationships to alienated cooperation, where individuals are compelled to work together under conditions of isolation. The social nature of labor is experienced as an external force — the will of the capitalist — rather than a collective human endeavor. Workers contribute to a productive system that is fundamentally indifferent to their individual development, while capitalists embody the impersonal force of capital itself.

Machinery, which could otherwise liberate humanity, serves to intensify exploitation under capitalism. It extends working hours, increases labor intensity, and transforms workers into mere appendages of the machine. The very tools created to control nature instead enslave humanity. Marx describes this as the vampire-like nature of capital, which thrives by extracting the life energy of labor.

===== Socialization =====
The apparent social character of labor under capitalism is purely technological and fails to build genuine community. Workers engage in forced cooperation, not as free individuals, but as fragmented components of capital’s productive machinery. The division of labor isolates individuals, reducing them to specialists whose sole function is to serve the system’s pursuit of surplus value.

In this arrangement, both workers and capitalists lose their humanity. Workers are reduced to instruments of production, while capitalists become personifications of capital, driven solely by its imperative to expand. Marx insists that capitalist production strips both classes of subjectivity: workers are exploited, and capitalists are dehumanized, but only the working class has the potential to resist this condition. Their alienation gives rise to a revolutionary class consciousness aimed at dismantling capitalism and reclaiming their humanity.

For Marx, the essence of capitalism lies not merely in poverty, but in the loss of human subjectivity and community. The socialist movement emerges not from poverty alone, but from the class antagonisms that awaken the working class to its historical mission. Socialism, in contrast to capitalism, represents a world where humanity reclaims its subjectivity and builds authentic social relations, free from alienation.

=== Reification ===
Reification, a central concept in Marxist humanism, describes the process by which social relations are objectified and appear as autonomous, immutable entities, obscuring their human origins. First systematically developed by György Lukács in History and Class Consciousness (1923), reification extends Karl Marx’s theory of commodity fetishism, highlighting how capitalist social structures transform human activity into impersonal forces that dominate individuals.

Lukács defines reification as the condition in which "a definite social relation between men assumes the fantastic form of a relation between things". This transformation occurs when human labor is commodified, making social relations appear as objective, external, and independent of human agency. Influenced by Max Weber and Hegel, Lukács argues that capitalist rationalization fosters a fragmented consciousness, wherein individuals perceive society as a collection of static, unchangeable structures rather than a historically dynamic totality.

Marxist humanists see the critique of reification as essential for revolutionary praxis. They argue that overcoming reification requires both a transformation of social structures and a corresponding change in consciousness. Lukács insists that only the proletariat, by becoming aware of its historical role, can transcend the reified structures of capitalism and achieve genuine human emancipation.

=== Praxis ===
Marx's theory of alienation is intimately linked to a theory of praxis, or the unity of theory and practice in human activity. Praxis is Man's conscious, autonomous, creative, self-reflective shaping of changing historical conditions. Marx understands praxis as both a tool for changing the course of history and a criterion for the evaluation of history. Marxist humanism views Man as in essence a being of praxis – a self-conscious creature who can appropriate for his own use the whole realm of inorganic nature – and Marx's philosophy as in essence a "philosophy of praxis" – a theory that demands the transformation of the world through active participation.

==== Historical and philosophical foundations ====
The intellectual lineage of Marx's concept of praxis can be traced to Aristotle, who distinguished between theoria (contemplation), poiesis (production), and praxis (action). However, Marx’s use of praxis diverges significantly from its classical meaning. Whereas Aristotle viewed praxis primarily in the context of ethical and political life, Marx saw it as revolutionary activity, emphasizing that human beings transform both their environment and themselves through labor.

Marx’s concept of praxis is deeply influenced by his critique of Hegelian idealism and the Young Hegelians. The shift from Hegel’s speculative philosophy to Marx’s revolutionary materialism is marked by a redefinition of human action. While Hegel saw history as the unfolding of Absolute Spirit through rational necessity, Marx sought to "demystify" this abstraction by grounding historical development in human labor and social relations. For Marx, history is made neither by objective forces nor dialectical laws. History is made by people, who act to transform their world within the limits of historically defined possibilities.

==== Human nature: naturalism and humanism ====
The concept of human nature is the belief that all human individuals share some common features. In the Economic and Philosophic Manuscripts of 1844, Marx describes his position on human nature as a unity of naturalism and humanism.

Naturalism is the view that Man is part of the system of nature. Marx sees Man as an objective, natural being – the product of a long biological evolution. Nature is that which is opposed to Man, yet Man is himself a part of nature. Man, like animals and plants, is conditioned by nature and his natural needs. It is through nature that Man satisfies the needs and drives that constitute his essence. Man is an "object" that has other "objects": humans are physical beings who depend on things outside themselves (food, materials, other people) to live and express their nature.

Humanism is the view that Man is a being of praxis who both changes nature and creates himself. It is not the simple attribute of consciousness that makes Man peculiarly human, but rather the unity of consciousness and practice – the conscious objectification of human powers and needs in sensuous reality. Marx distinguishes the free, conscious productive activity of human beings from the unconscious, compulsive production of animals. Praxis is an activity unique to Man: while other animals produce, they produce only what is immediately necessary. Man, on the other hand, produces universally and freely. Man is able to produce according to the standard of any species and at all times knows how to apply an intrinsic standard to the object he produces. Man thus creates according to the laws of beauty.

The starting point for Man's self-development is the wealth of his own capacities and needs that he himself creates. Man's evolution enters the stage of human history when, through praxis, he acquires more and more control of blind natural forces and produces a humanized natural environment.

==== Human knowledge: Marx's epistemology ====
For Marx, the essence of humanity lies in labor — Man's active and practical engagement with nature. This understanding demands a reevaluation of traditional epistemology. Marx's epistemology centers on two key themes:

1) Objectivity: Marx emphasizes the independent reality of both natural and social forms, asserting that these exist independently of their being known or perceived. This aligns with a realist perspective in ontology (or the "intransitive" dimension).

2) The Role of Labor: Marx highlights the importance of work or labor in the process of cognition. Knowledge is a social and inherently historical product, shaped by praxis and reflecting a "practicist" viewpoint in epistemology (the "transitive" dimension).

Marx challenges the foundational questions posed by philosophers like Descartes and Kant. He critiques the notion of pure self-consciousness as a starting point, dismissing the idea that the subject can perceive itself in isolation from its existence within nature and society. Similarly, Marx rejects the idea that nature exists as a fully independent reality to which human subjectivity is a mere byproduct. Instead, he emphasizes that humanity's relationship with nature is inherently practical and active, not a passive or detached contemplation.

Perception, for Marx, arises from the dynamic interplay of human action and nature. This interaction produces a reality shaped by human sociality and purpose. Through this lens, human senses are not simply biological tools but are socially shaped and transformative. For instance, the ability to appreciate music depends on cultivated faculties, just as the recognition of any object is tied to its relevance to human life and activity. Marx asserts that the senses of a "social man" differ significantly from those of an isolated individual, as they are deeply intertwined with social practices and communal life.

In his Theses on Feuerbach, Marx admonishes the materialism of Ludwig Feuerbach for its contemplative theory of knowledge. Marx criticizes Feuerbach for treating objects in a purely contemplative manner, neglecting their basis in "sensuous, practical, human activity." In Marx’s view, perception and knowledge are not passive but are embedded in humanity’s active relationship with the world. Objects are not merely "given" by nature but are shaped by human needs and efforts. Marx dismisses speculative disputes about the conformity of thought to reality, arguing that truth must be proven through practice: thought’s reality and power lie in its ability to transform the world. For Marx, questions about the nature of thought are inseparable from its practical effects in human society. Through praxis, human beings come to understand the world and themselves.

== Criticisms and defences ==
=== Criticisms ===
As the terminology of alienation, while present, does not occupy a prominent or central place in Marx's later works, Marxist humanism has been controversial within Marxist circles. The tendency was attacked by the Italian Western Marxist Galvano Della Volpe and by Louis Althusser, the French Structuralist Marxist. Althusser, in particular, argues that Marx's thought is divided into two distinct phases: that of the "Young Marx" and that of the "Mature Marx". Althusser holds that Marx's thought is marked by a radical epistemological break, to have occurred in 1845 – The German Ideology being the earliest work to betray the discontinuity. For Althusser, the humanism of Marx's early writings – an ethical theory – is fundamentally incongruous with the "scientific" theory he argues is to be found in Marx's later works. In his view, the Mature Marx presents the social relations of capitalism as relations within and between structures; individuals or classes have no role as the subjects of history.

Althusser regards socialist humanism as an ethical and therefore ideological phenomenon. Humanism, in his view, is a bourgeois individualist philosophy that ascribes a universal essence of Man that is the attribute of each individual, and through which there is potential for authenticity and common human purpose. This essence does not exist: it is a formal structure of thought whose content is determined by the dominant interests of each historical epoch. The argument of socialist humanism rests on a similar moral and ethical foundation. Hence, it reflects the reality of discrimination and exploitation that gives rise to it but never truly grasps this reality in thought. Marxist theory must go beyond this to a scientific analysis that directs to underlying forces such as economic relations and social institutions. For this reason, Althusser sympathized with the criticisms of socialist humanism made by the Chinese Communist Party, which condemned the tendency as "revisionism" and "phony communism".

Althusser sees Marxist theory as primarily science and not philosophy but he does not adhere to Friedrich Engels's "natural philosophy". The philosophy implicit in Marxism, he argues, is an epistemology - a theory of knowledge - that sees science as "theoretical practice" and philosophy as the "theory of theoretical practice". However, he later qualifies this position by claiming that Marxist philosophy, unlike Marxist science, has normative and ideological elements: Marxist philosophy is "politics in the field of theory" and "class struggle in theory".

=== Defences ===
Althusser is critical of what he perceives to be a reliance among Marxist humanists on Marx's 1844 Manuscripts, which Marx did not write for publication. Marxist humanists strongly dispute this: they hold that the concept of alienation is recognizable in Marx's mature work even when the terminology has been abandoned. Teodor Shanin and Raya Dunayevskaya assert that not only is alienation present in the late Marx, but that there is no meaningful distinction to be made between the "young Marx" and "mature Marx". The Marxist humanist activist Lilia D. Monzó states that "Marxist-Humanism, as developed by Raya Dunayevskaya, considers the totality of Marx's works, recognizing that his early work in the Economic and Philosophic Manuscripts of 1844, was profoundly humanist and led to and embeds his later works, including Capital."

Contra Althusser, Leszek Kołakowski argues that in Capital Marx does treat human individuals as mere embodiments of functions within a system of relations that is apparently possessed of its own dynamic and created independently of human will. However, Marx does so not as a general methodical rule, but as a critique of the dehumanizing nature of exchange-value. When Marx and Engels present individuals as non-subjects subordinated to structures that they unwittingly support, their intention is to illuminate the absence of control that persons have in bourgeois society, not to endorse it as a permanent truth. The domination of alien forces over human beings is, for Marx and Engels, precisely the state of affairs that the overthrow of capitalism is meant to bring to an end.

== Marxist humanists ==
Notable thinkers and schools of thought associated with Marxist humanism include:

- Kevin B. Anderson (born 1948), American social theorist and activist.
- John Berger (1926–2017), English art critic, novelist, painter, and author.
- Marshall Berman (1940–2013), American Marxist writer and philosopher, author of the philosophical novel All That Is Solid Melts into Air.
- Ernst Bloch (1885–1977), German-Jewish Marxist philosopher.
- Budapest School, a school of Marxist humanism, post-Marxism, and dissident liberalism that emerged in communist Hungary in the early 1960s.
- Raya Dunayevskaya (1910–1987), founder of the philosophy of Marxist humanism in the United States.
  - News and Letters Committees (1950s onwards), a small, revolutionary-socialist organization in the United States founded by Dunayevskaya.
- Frantz Fanon (1925–1961), psychiatrist, philosopher, revolutionary, and author from Martinique.
- Mark Fisher (1968–2017), English writer, music critic, political and cultural theorist, philosopher, and teacher.
- Frankfurt School (1930s onwards), a school of neo-Marxist critical theory, social research, and philosophy.
  - Walter Benjamin (1892–1940), German-Jewish Marxist literary critic, essayist, translator, and philosopher.
  - Erich Fromm (1900–1980), German-Jewish Marxist psychoanalyst, social psychologist, and humanist philosopher.
  - Herbert Marcuse (1898–1979), German-American Marxist philosopher and sociologist.
- Paulo Freire (1921–1997), Brazilian educator and influential theorist of critical pedagogy.
- Roger Garaudy (1913-2012)
- Nigel Gibson (), British philosopher and Marxist theorist.
- Lucien Goldmann (1913–1970), French philosopher and sociologist of Jewish-Romanian origins.
- André Gorz (1923–2007), Austrian-French social philosopher.
- Antonio Gramsci (1891–1937), Italian Marxist writer, politician, political philosopher, and linguist.
- Christopher Hill (1912–2003), English Marxist historian.
- C. L. R. James (1901–1989), Afro-Trinidadian historian, journalist, socialist theorist, and writer.
- Andrew Kliman (born 1955), American Marxist economist and philosopher, specializing in Marxian economics.
- Leszek Kołakowski (1927–2009), Polish philosopher and historian of ideas. Kołakowski broke with Marxism after the Polish 1968 political crisis forced him out of communist Poland.
- Karel Kosík (1926–2003), Czech philosopher who wrote on topics such as phenomenology and dialectics from a Marxist humanist perspective.
- Henri Lefebvre (1901–1991), French sociologist, intellectual, and philosopher, generally considered to be a neo-Marxist.
- John Lewis (1889–1976), British Unitarian minister and Marxist philosopher.
- György Lukács (1885–1971), Hungarian Marxist philosopher and literary critic.
- Open Marxism, an anti-structuralist and heterodox school of Marxist philosophy.
- José Carlos Mariátegui (1894–1930), Peruvian intellectual, journalist, and political philosopher.
- Peter McLaren (born 1948), Canadian-American educator and influential theorist of critical pedagogy.
- David McReynolds (1929–2018), American democratic socialist and pacifist activist.
- Rodolfo Mondolfo (1877–1976), Italian Marxist philosopher and historian of Ancient Greek philosophy.
- Praxis School, a Marxist humanist philosophical movement that emerged in Zagreb and Belgrade in the SFR Yugoslavia between the 1960s and 1970s.
- Walter Rodney (1942–1980), Guyanese Marxist historian and political activist.
- Franklin Rosemont (1943–2009), American writer, artist, historian, and activist.
- Maximilien Rubel (1905–1996), Austrian Marxist historian and council communist.
- Wang Ruoshui (1926–2002), Chinese journalist, political theorist, and Marxist philosopher.
- Jean-Paul Sartre (1905–1980), French existentialist philosopher, playwright, novelist, screenwriter, political activist, biographer, and literary critic.
- Adam Schaff (1913-2006), Polish philosopher, author of Marxism and the Human Individual.
- Cyril Smith (1929–2008), British lecturer of statistics at the London School of Economics, socialist, and revolutionary humanist.
- Ivan Sviták (1925–1994), Czech social critic and aesthetic theorist.
- E. P. Thompson (1924–1993), English historian, socialist, and peace campaigner.
- Raymond Williams (1921–1988), Welsh literary theorist, co-founder of cultural studies.

== See also ==
- Autonomist Marxism
- Budapest School
- Dialectic
- Frankfurt School
- Historical materialism
- Karl Marx
- Luxemburgism
- Marxism
- New Left
- Orthodox Marxism
- Praxis School
- Secular humanism
- Structure and agency
- Subjectivity
