= Cyril Smith (Marxist) =

British lecturer of statistics

Cyril Smith (1929–2008) was a British lecturer of statistics at the London School of Economics, socialist, and revolutionary humanist.

== Political beginnings ==
Smith began attending Communist Party meetings at University College London in 1947. By his own admission, he was attracted to the "systematic way [of] understand[ing] the world" that Stalinism provided. He quickly became disillusioned, however, during the Lysenko affair, which led to him turning his attention towards the works of Leon Trotsky.

== Break with "Leninist Marxism" ==
Starting in 1987, Smith began to examine what he was beginning to feel was the distortion of Marx's ideas by his own followers. This project first manifested itself in a small booklet titled Communist Society and Marxist Theory. While well aware of its limitations, Smith hoped that the work would begin a dialogue on the subject rather than be the final word. To his dismay, rather than beginning a discussion, the work ended communication entirely with many in his organization. This inspired Smith to probe deeper and work on a more complete account of the matter, a project that Smith would dedicate the remainder of his academic career to in one way or another.

Later in life, Smith would look back on his years as a Trotskyist as necessary for his political trajectory, but years that he put behind himself happily.

...it [was] important to have seriously participated in the attempt to build the Fourth International and to grasp its ideas; it was also vital to have subsequently and equally seriously ceased to hold to those ideas.

== Marx at the Millennium ==
In 1996, Smith published the results of years of study and examination, the book Marx at the Millennium. Described by Smith as an attempt to discover "what Marx was trying to do," it is as much a critique of how others have attempted to answer that question as it is a presentation of Smith's own answer. Setting his work apart from others of its type, however, is that Smith's critiques were aimed at the views of Marx's followers themselves. For Smith, the degeneration of Marxist thought he believed to have come about was as much, if not more so, the fault of Marxists as it was Marx's right-wing and liberal detractors.

Many people these days will tell you ‘Marxism is dead’, usually with the collapse of the USSR in mind. There are still several varieties of ‘Marxist’ who deny it, of course. However, neither side shows much inclination to talk about the actual ideas whose death or survival are being disputed.

In his studies, Smith came to the conclusion that there was no basis in the writings of Karl Marx for a "Leninist party" or a "workers' state," putting him sharply at odds with the views of his former comrades and those that he had earlier himself held. In contrast, Smith understood the dictatorship of the proletariat to be the result of "the ability of the proletariat to form itself into a subject." This state, then, was not something apart and above the working-class, directing its revolutionary movement from afar, but instead the organized mass of individuals carrying out the process of unified self-liberation. It was not to be a state of transition, but rather one of transformation.

Most controversially, Smith argued that Marx was "not a sociologist or an economist, nor a social scientist or political scientist of any kind... ." This position led to a years long debate with the Marxist-Humanist journal Hobgoblin.

== Karl Marx and the Future of the Human ==
Smith's second book, Karl Marx and the Future of the Human, was an attempt to continue his project of examining the differences he found between views commonly held by Marxists and those expressed by Marx himself. Smith described the work as being his second attempt at "rereading" Marx. Namely, he attempted here to fix what he believed was his earlier mistake of attempting to "absolve Engels of all blame for the distortion of Marx," as well as sharpen his critique of the "old orthodoxy."

In this work, Smith puts forward his most direct summary of what he believed the general "outlook" of Marx's work to have been:

(1) In class society, individual humans are governed by social forms that are alien to their humanity. This is insane.

(2) These forms condition the way that they think about themselves and about their social life.

(3) When science theorizes social problems, its categories give the alien forms their highest expression.

(4) The critique of these categories breaks up their appearance of being ‘natural’, and so opens the way for conscious social practice to release their human content.
