= Johannes Popitz =

German politician and resistance member (1884–1945)

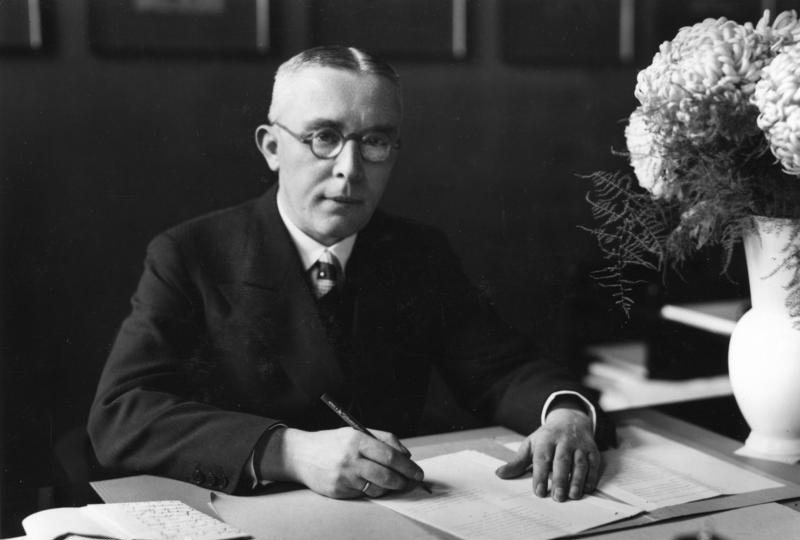

Prussian Minister of Finance and Minister of State
- In office 21 April 1933 – 21 July 1944
- Prime Minister: Hermann Göring
- Preceded by: Himself (as Reichskommissar)
- Succeeded by: None

Reichskommissar Prussian Ministry of Finance
- In office 29 October 1932 – 21 April 1933
- Chancellor: Kurt von Schleicher; Franz von Papen; Adolf Hitler
- Preceded by: Franz Schleusener
- Succeeded by: Himself (as Minister of Finance)

Reichsminister without Portfolio
- In office 29 October 1932 – 30 January 1933
- Chancellor: Kurt von Schleicher; Franz von Papen

State Secretary Prussian Ministry of Finance
- In office 1925 – 21 December 1929
- Prime Minister: Otto Braun

Personal details
- Born: 2 December 1884 Leipzig, Kingdom of Saxony, German Empire
- Died: 2 February 1945 (aged 60) Plötzensee Prison, Berlin, Nazi Germany
- Cause of death: Execution by hanging
- Party: Nazi Party (from January 1937)
- Profession: Lawyer

Hermann Eduard Johannes Popitz (2 December 1884 – 2 February 1945) was a Prussian lawyer, finance minister and a member of the German Resistance against the government of Nazi Germany. He was the father of Heinrich Popitz, an important German sociologist.

== Life and career ==
As a pharmacist's son from Leipzig, Popitz studied political science and law in Dessau, Lausanne, Leipzig, Berlin and Halle. From 1907 to 1918, he acted as a junior government lawyer. In 1918, he married Cornalia Slot with whom he had three children. In 1919, after the election for the Weimar National Assembly, Popitz became a Geheimrat in the finance ministry. Popitz was an honorary professor of tax law and financial science at the University of Berlin and the State Academy (Verwaltungsakademie) from 1922.

From 1925 to 1929, Popitz acted as State Secretary in the German Ministry of Finance, where he sometimes worked under Finance Minister Rudolf Hilferding with whom, in December 1929, he was provisionally retired owing to political differences with the government.

On 20 July 1932 the Reich government of Franz von Papen took over direct administration of the Free State of Prussia in the so-called Preußenschlag. Popitz was named head of the Prussian Finance Ministry with the title of Reichskommissar on 29 October 1932. He was also named a Reichsminister without portfolio as an independent politician in the Reich cabinet. He retained these positions in the cabinet of Kurt von Schleicher on 3 December 1932. When the Nazis came to power on 30 January 1933, Popitz remained in charge of the Prussian Finance Ministry as Reichskommissar but was not named to the Reich cabinet formed by Adolf Hitler.

On 21 April 1933 when the Prussian state government was reconstituted under Minister-President Hermann Göring, Popitz was formally named a Minister of State and Finance Minister in the new Prussian cabinet, although at this time he still was not a member of the Nazi Party. As a member of the Prussian cabinet, Popitz became an ex officio member of the newly reconstituted Prussian State Council at its formation on 11 July 1933. He was also made a member of the Academy for German Law on 3 October 1933, sitting on its prasidium (standing committee) and was chairman of the Committee for Law on Economics and Science. He would hold these positions until removed in July 1944.

To mark the fourth anniversary of the Nazi regime on 30 January 1937, Hitler personally conferred the Golden Party Badge upon several non-Nazi members of the Reich and Prussian governments. By his acceptance, Popitz officially joined the Nazi Party (membership number 3,805,233).

== Resistance activity and death ==
After Kristallnacht (9 November 1938), Popitz protested the mass persecution of Jews by offering his resignation, which was refused. As a conservative and monarchist who would have preferred to see Crown Prince Wilhelm, Kaiser Wilhelm II's eldest son, succeed Adolf Hitler, Popitz became active in the resistance circles beginning in 1938, including the group around Carl Friedrich Goerdeler. As a member of another such right-wing circle, the Mittwochsgesellschaft ("Wednesday Society"), a small group of high officials and industrialists who had evolved from a debating club into a centre for conservative opposition to the régime, he was drawn ever further into the centre of the conspiracy against Hitler and drew up a provisional post-Hitler constitution, the Vorläufiges Staatsgrundgesetz, whose general tendencies were quite authoritarian.

In the summer of 1943, Popitz conducted secret talks with Heinrich Himmler, whose support he sought to win for a coup d'état and whom he tried to convince to take part in attempts to negotiate with the western Allies for an acceptable peace deal.

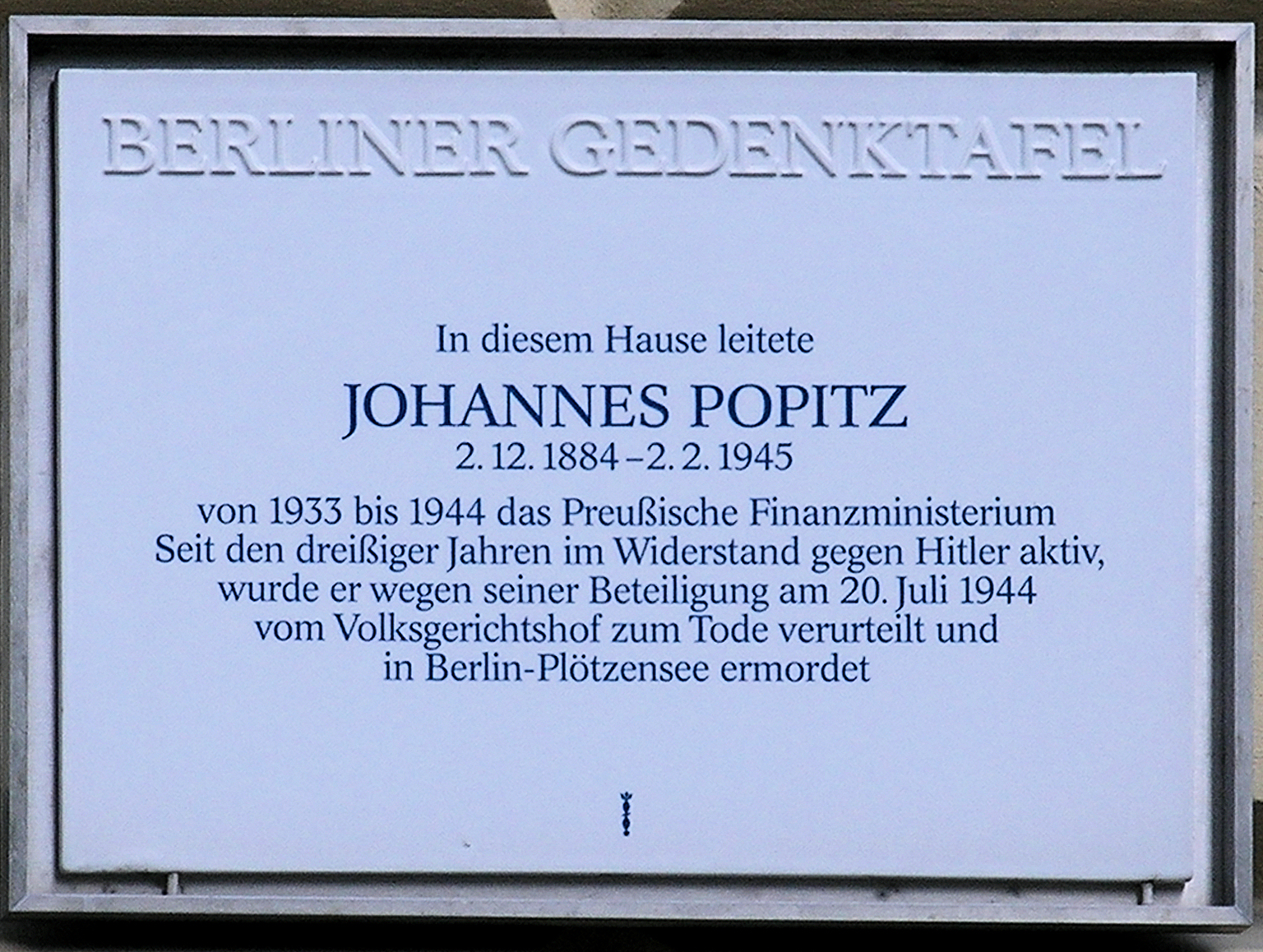
Berlin memorial plaque for Johannes Popitz in Berlin-Mitte, Am Festungsgraben 1, Germany

Already in the autumn of that same year, Popitz was being watched by the Gestapo and indeed was arrested in Berlin on 21 July 1944, the day after Claus von Stauffenberg's unsuccessful attempt on Hitler's life at the Wolfsschanze in East Prussia. After his arrest, Popitz told the Gestapo:

As somebody who was very familiar with conditions in the System period [the Weimar Republic], my view of the Jewish question was that the Jews ought to disappear from the life of the state and the economy. However, as far as the methods were concerned, I repeatedly advocated a somewhat more gradual approach, particularly in light of diplomatic considerations.

Popitz also told the Gestapo that:

The Jewish question had to be dealt with, their removal from state and economy was unavoidable. But the use of force which led to the destruction of property, to arbitrary arrests and to the destruction of life could not be reconciled with law and morality, and, in addition, seemed to me to have dangerous implications for people's attitudes to property and human life. At the same time, I saw in the treatment of the Jewish Question a great danger of increasing international hostility to Germany and its regime.

On 3 October, he was sentenced to death at the Volksgerichtshof by Roland Freisler. At first, in the hopes that the contacts with the Allies that he and Popitz had discussed might still develop, Himmler saw to it that Popitz was not put to death. However, as it became apparent that no such talks would be forthcoming, Popitz's fate was sealed, and he was hanged on 2 February 1945 at Plötzensee Prison, in Berlin, at the same time as Carl Friedrich Goerdeler and Alfred Delp.

== Bibliography ==
- Finanzausgleichsprobleme. - Berlin : Dt. Kommunal-Verl., 1927
- Der künftige Finanzausgleich zwischen Reich, Ländern und Gemeinden. Kiel : Bibl. d. Inst. d. Weltwirtschaft, 1955 <Repr. d. Ausg. Berlin 1932>

== Sources ==
- Lutz-Arwed Benthin: Johannes Popitz und Carl Schmitt: zur wirtschaftlichen Theorie des totalen Staates in Deutschland. - München : Beck, 1972. (Münchener Studien zur Politik; 19) – ISBN 3-406-02799-7
- Hildemarie Dieckmann: Johannes Popitz: Entwicklung und Wirksamkeit in der Zeit der Weimarer Zeit. Berlin : Colloquium Verl., 1960
