= J.-P. Mayer =

German-born writer

Jacob-Peter Mayer (1903–1992) was a German-born writer and editor of the works of Alexis de Tocqueville and founder of the Tocqueville Research Centre at the University of Reading where he was Professor Emeritus. He was considered 'the foremost authority on the great French sociologist'.

Mayer edited and introduced the 1933 edition of Konstantin Frantz's Masse oder Volk (published by Alfred Protte), under the pseudonym "Franz Kemper".

Mayer was the editor of the Gallimard edition of Tocqueville's Oeuvres Complètes (27 volumes, 1951–83), as well as the author of books on Tocqueville, Marx and Max Weber. In 1943 Routledge & Kegan Paul in London published his Political Thought in France: From the Revolution to the Fourth Republic. The book went into a third revised edition in 1961. This was followed by Max Weber and German Politics (Routledge, London 1944). In 1946 he published Sociology of Film: Studies and Documents (Faber, London). From 1976 to 1979 he edited the book series European Political Thought for Arno Press, New York.

In his youth he was a member of the German Social Democratic Party and active in the anti-Nazi movement of the 1930s. Mayer fled to England with his wife Lola (née Grusemann) in 1936, eventually settling in Stoke Poges near London. During the war he worked on German broadcasts for the Ministry of Economic Warfare. He became a British citizen in 1950.

== Bibliography (selection) ==
- Translation of Thomas Hobbes' Leviathan: Leviathan - oder von Materie, Form und Gewalt des kirchlichen und bürgerlichen Staates, 1936
- Political Thought: The European Tradition. In co-Operation with R. H. S. Crossman, P. Kecskemeti, E. Kohn-Bramstedt, C. J. S. Sprigge. With an Introduction by R. H. Tawney. Dent, 1939
- Sociology of Film: Studies and Documents. Faber 1946
- Max Weber and German politics: a study in political sociology. Faber 1956.
