= Religious alienation =

Religious alienation is a term some use to describe how religion creates an impediment to human self-understanding.

== Georg Wilhelm Friedrich Hegel ==
Although the roots of alienation lie far back in the Judeo-Christian tradition, the concept of alienation first gained prominence in the philosophy of Hegel, and particularly in his mature writings. There are signs of the idea in his earlier works, but it is not until the Phenomenology of Spirit (1807) that alienation occupies a central place in his writings.

In the opening sections of the Phenomenology, Hegel attacked the views of common sense and simplified natural science that the world consisted of discrete objects independent of man's consciousness. Truth, for Hegel, was not to be found in knowledge that was stripped of any influence from man's own desires and feelings. Ultimately, Hegel considered that there could be no truth that was not intimately linked with the ongoing process of human beings as thinking subjects; truth was their truth. The supposed objectivity of the world of nature was in fact an alienation, for man's task was to discover, behind these appearances, his own essential life and finally to view everything as a facet of his own self-consciousness. The same principle applied to the world of culture in which such spheres as art and religion, if viewed as independent of man, constituted so many alienations to be overcome by integration into the final understanding and recapitulation which was Absolute Knowledge.

== Bruno Bauer ==
Hegel had created a system; and all his followers believed that it was the final one. However, when it came to applying the system to particular problems, they conceived his system to be ambivalent. The fact that alienation seemed to them to be a challenge, something to be overcome, led them to put the emphasis on the concepts of dialectic and negativity in Hegel's system; and thus they challenged, first in religion and then in politics, his view that the problem of alienation had, at least in principle, been solved. The foremost among these radical disciples of Hegel, Bruno Bauer, applied the concept of alienation to the religious field. Bauer, who lectured in theology and made his name as a Gospel critic, considered that religious beliefs, and in particular Christianity, caused a division in man's consciousness by becoming opposed to this consciousness as a separate power. Thus religion was an attitude towards the essence of self-consciousness that had become estranged from itself. In this context, Bauer promoted the use of the expression "self-alienation" that soon became current among the Young Hegelians.

== Ludwig Feuerbach ==
For Feuerbach (The Essence of Christianity (1841)), people alienate their essential being by attributing their human qualities to a god who is then worshipped on account of these qualities. In worshipping god, therefore, people are unconsciously worshipping themselves. Thus Feuerbach argues that religion is a form of alienation which prevents people from attaining realisation of their own species-being. Feuerbach's thinking has been described as humanist in that his theory of alienation is based on a theory of human nature as species-being, as innate to the human species. This position would later be examined by Karl Marx in his "Theses on Feuerbach".
