= Heinrich Popitz =

German sociologist (1925–2002)

Heinrich Popitz (14 May 1925 – 1 April 2002) was a German sociologist who worked towards a general sociological theory. Alongside thinkers like Helmut Schelsky, Hans Paul Bahrdt, Dieter Claessens, and others he was one of those sociologists in post-war Germany who founded their sociological reflections on insights from Philosophical Anthropology, thus creating an alternative to the then dominant paradigms of the Frankfurt School and Cologne School (around René König). His work revolves around the four central concepts power, norms, technology, and creativity.

== Biography ==
Heinrich Popitz was born in Berlin, Germany, on 14 May 1925. He grew up in a bourgeois home, his father being the leading fiscal policy maker Johannes Popitz who was part of the resistance movement behind Graf Stauffenberg and was executed by the National Socialists in early 1945. After the Second World War, Heinrich Popitz studied Philosophy, History, and Economics in Heidelberg and Göttingen and got a PhD in Philosophy with a dissertation on Marx, advised by Karl Jaspers. In 1951, he started working as a social researcher in the German coal mining area (Ruhrpott) and later received a grant from the Rockefeller Foundation to conduct a large-scale research project on industrial workers’ perceptions of society. From this study, two publications arose that today count as classical works of qualitative social research in Germany. After finishing a sociological habilitation under the supervision of Arnold Bergstraesser, Popitz became professor of sociology first in Basel, Switzerland, and then in Freiburg, where he stayed until his retirement in 1992, with an interruption in 1971/72, when he held the Theodor Heuss Chair at the New School for Social Research in New York City. Heinrich Popitz died in Freiburg im Breisgau on 1 April 2002; his scientific estate is part of the Social Science Archive Konstanz.

== Work ==
Influenced by Philosophical Anthropology as well as by Cultural Anthropology, Heinrich Popitz’s interest as a sociologist was not so much in giving an account of modern society, but rather in the forms of sociation (Georg Simmel) as such. Within this framework of a general sociological theory, four concepts were of outstanding significance for his thinking: power, norms, technology, and creativity.

(a) Power: Like most theorists of power, Popitz regarded power as an omnipresent element of sociation. In his seminal book Phenomena of Power, he explores its anthropological roots and distinguishes between four elementary forms: power of action (violence), instrumental power (threats and promises), authoritative power (authority), and the power of data constitution.

(b) Norms: For Popitz, the problem of contingency (Niklas Luhmann) is solved by the establishment of social norms that make the future actions of alter foreseeable for ego. In this way, ego can count on those actions as if they would already have been performed and does not have to wait for their actual execution; social interaction is thus accelerated. Important factors in the standardization of behavior are sanctions and social roles.

(c) Technology: Social interaction for Popitz is heavily influenced by the mediation of technical artifacts. Aiming at an “anthropology of technology”, he explored the significance of technical innovations for the development of human society as well as the correlation between the human organism and technical action.

(d) Creativity: Popitz was fascinated by the human capacity to create something new, to spontaneously modify the world in which we live and thus to become the originator of the own existence. For him, the study of society has to consider the power of phantasy, i.e. the virtues of subjectivation, objectivation, and transcendence.

== Writings by Heinrich Popitz ==
=== Writings in German ===
- Der entfremdete Mensch. Zeitkritik und Geschichtsphilosophie des jungen Marx (originally Verlag für Recht und Gesellschaft, Basel 1953). Wissenschaftliche Buchgesellschaft, Darmstadt 1980, ISBN 3-534-06474-7.
- Die Wohnwünsche der Bergarbeiter. Soziologische Erhebung, Deutung und Kritik der Wohnvorstellungen eines Berufes (together with Elisabeth Pfeil, Gunther Ipsen). Mohr, Tübingen 1954, ISBN 3-16-506991-3.
- Technik und Industriearbeit. Soziologische Untersuchungen in der Hüttenindustrie (together with H. P. Barth, E. A. Jüres, H. Kesting). Mohr, Tübingen 1957, ISBN 3-16-538512-2.
- Das Gesellschaftsbild des Arbeiters. Soziologische Untersuchung in der Hüttenindustrie (together with H. P. Barth, E. A. Jüres, H. Kesting). Mohr, Tübingen 1957, ISBN 3-16-539192-0.
- Der Begriff der sozialen Rolle als Element der soziologischen Theorie. Mohr, Tübingen 1967, ISBN 3-16-537801-0.
- Über die Präventivwirkung des Nichtwissens. Dunkelziffer, Norm und Strafe (originally Mohr, Tübingen 1968). BWV, Berlin 2003, ISBN 3-8305-0522-1.
- Prozesse der Machtbildung. Mohr, Tübingen 1968, ISBN 3-16-538071-6.
- Die normative Konstruktion von Gesellschaft. Mohr, Tübingen 1980, ISBN 3-16-543151-5.
- Phänomene der Macht. Mohr, Tübingen 1986 (2nd, extended edition 1992), ISBN 3-16-145897-4.
- Der Aufbruch zur artifiziellen Gesellschaft. Zur Anthropologie der Technik. Mohr, Tübingen 1995, ISBN 3-16-146381-1.
- Wege der Kreativität. Mohr, Tübingen 2000, ISBN 3-16-147310-8.
- Die Quadratur des gordischen Knotens. Zettelverse. Jürgen Cromm WiSoMed-Verlag, Göttingen, Augsburg, 2006, ISBN 3-921969-27-1.
- Soziale Normen. Frankfurt am Main: Suhrkamp, 2006, ISBN 978-3-518-29394-2 (ed. by Friedrich Pohlmann and Wolfgang Eßbach)
- Einführung in die Soziologie. Konstanz: Konstanz University Press, 2010, ISBN 978-3-86253-002-1 (ed. by Jochen Dreher and Michael K. Walter).
- Allgemeine Soziologie, Konstanz: Konstanz University Press, 2011, ISBN 978-3-86253-018-2 (ed. by Jochen Dreher and Andreas Göttlich).

=== Writings in English ===
- The Concept of Social Role as an Element of Sociological Theory. In: Role (Sociological Studies 4), ed. by J. A. Jackson. London: Cambridge University Press, pp. 11–39. (German original: Der Begriff der sozialen Rolle als Element der soziologischen Theorie)
- Phenomena of Power. New York: Columbia University Press 2017, ISBN 978-0-231-17594-4.

== Secondary Literature (English) ==
- Gianfranco Poggi: Forms of Power. Cambridge: Polity Press 2001, ISBN 0-7456-2475-8. (especially chapters Two and Three)
- Gianfranco Poggi: Varieties of Political Experience. Power Phenomena In Modern Society. University of Essex: ECPR Press 2014, ISBN 978-1-907-301-75-9. (especially chapters Two, Four and Five)
- Christel Hopf and Walter Müller: On the Development of Empirical Social Research in the Federal Republic of Germany. In: Soziologie, Special Edition 3/1994, 52ff, ISBN 978-3-322-95757-3.
- Günther Lüschen: 25 Years of German Sociology after World War II: Institutionalization and Theory. In: Soziologie, Special Edition 3/1994, 11ff, ISBN 978-3-322-95757-3.
- Andreas Göttlich and Jochen Dreher: Editors' Introduction. In: Heinrich Popitz, Phenomena of Power. Authority, Domination, and Violence. Columbia University Press 2017, IXff.
