= Siegfried Landshut =

German political scientist and sociologist (1897–1968)

Siegfried Landshut (August 7, 1897 – December 8, 1968) was a German sociologist and political scientist. He is considered one of the founders of modern political science in post-war Germany and held the first chair for "The Science of Politics" at the University of Hamburg. Landshut became known as an editor of Karl Marx's early writings, which he discovered.

== Life ==
Siegfried Landshut was born on August 7, 1897, in Strasbourg. He was the son of architect Samuel Landshut and his wife Suzette, née Cohn. He graduated from high school in 1914. Due to World War I, he attended the Protestant Gymnasium in Strasbourg. On August 5, 1914, he volunteered for the Imperial German army. At the end of 1919, he returned to Germany from the German-Turkish front in the Middle East and initially studied law, then economics, at the University of Freiburg and Goethe University Frankfurt. In 1921, he received his doctorate (Ph.D.) in Freiburg under Robert Liefmann with a dissertation on Homo economicus. That same year, he married Edith Hess; the couple had three children.

In the following years, he studied and was influenced in his ideas by Edmund Husserl and Martin Heidegger in Freiburg, Max Scheler in Cologne, and Alfred Weber and Karl Jaspers in Heidelberg. His hope of being able to complete his habilitation under Weber was disappointed. In 1936, he wrote in retrospect in a curriculum vitae: “Intention to habilitate under Alfred Weber. Difficulties due to the habilitation of a second Jewish lecturer in the same field (besides Karl Mannheim).” Through the mediation of Alfred Weber, Landshut received a two-year research grant at the University of Hamburg, which was headed by Albrecht Mendelssohn Bartholdy. In Hamburg, his friendship with Hans von Dohnanyi began.

In 1926, a chair of sociology was established in Hamburg, when the discipline of sociology was still very young. Because of his Jewish heritage, Landshut, like many academics of Jewish descent, was forced out of the university. The Nazis made use of the "Law for the Restoration of the Professional Civil Service," created specifically for this purpose. For this reason, he was unable to submit his second doctoral dissertation in 1933 and was dismissed later that same year. As early as June 23, 1933, Landshut had left Hamburg to give guest lectures in Cairo, Egypt. He arranged for his family to join him later, as he had been promised a long-term teaching position in Cairo. This did not come to pass, and the Landshuts remained in Cairo under difficult economic conditions until 1936, when the family emigrated to Palestine.

In Jerusalem, various institutions and aid organizations funded a two-year research fellowship for Landshut at the Hebrew University. Despite intensive efforts by prominent intellectuals like Martin Buber, Ernst Simon, and Arthur Ruppin, his position at the university was not renewed after two years. The family once again found itself in a precarious financial situation. In 1939, the Economic Research Institute Jerusalem commissioned Landshut to conduct a study on the sociological foundations of communal settlements in Palestine. For research purposes, he stayed at Kibbutz Givat Brenner in 1940/41. The resulting study, "The Communal Settlement in Palestine," was published in Hebrew in 1944. Landshut had meanwhile taken on a different role and headed the German department of the British Mediterranean Radio in Jerusalem from 1942 to 1945. In 1945, the family moved back to Cairo, where Landshut became head of the Educational Section of the German Prisoners of War Directorate for three years. The directorate was responsible for the re-education of approximately 100,000 German prisoners of war in Egypt. In 1948, he moved to London. There, Landshut accepted a research assignment from the Anglo-Jewish Association on the topic of "Jewish Communities in the Muslim Countries of the Middle East."

He received the call to the first chair at the University of Hamburg for "The Science of Politics" on April 28, 1951, and was appointed full professor on July 18. Alongside his university professorship, he held a lectureship at the Academy for Public Economics (Hamburger Universität für Wirtschaft und Politik) from 1952 to 1959.

In 1964/65, he served as chairman of the German Association for Political Science.

Landshut died in Hamburg on December 8, 1968.

Since 2018, the Hamburg Institute for Social Research has awarded the Siegfried Landshut Prize annually.

== Work ==
Landshut's entire scholarly work revolves around the Western concepts of freedom and equality. Starting from an ontological-phenomenological approach, and influenced by the ideas of Edmund Husserl and Martin Heidegger, he wrote a critique of Max Weber's sociology, emphasizing its close thematic connection with Karl Marx. He presented a fundamental methodological critique of the social sciences and argued that Marx consistently addresses the theme of human self-alienation. His translation and edition of Alexis de Tocqueville's works aim to demonstrate this shared theme with Marx. Central to his work is the question of how the order of human life can be sustainably secured, given the tension between freedom/equality and domination, and the growing separation of state and society.

== Publications ==
- Kritik der Soziologie. Freiheit und Gleichheit als Ursprungsproblem der Soziologie, Duncker & Humblot, München 1929, first habilitation thesis (withdrawn due to threatened rejection), still under the title: Untersuchungen über die ursprüngliche Fragestellung zur sozialen und politischen Problematik.
- Mit J. P. Mayer (editor); Karl Marx: Der historische Materialismus; Die Frühschriften. Kröner, Stuttgart, 1932. 2 Bände. Neuausgabe, Karl Marx: Die Frühschriften. Kröner, Stuttgart, 1953.
- Karl Marx. Colemanns kleine Biographien, Lübeck, 1932. 40 Seiten.
- Die Gemeinschafts-Siedlung in Palästina, 1944. In Hebrew.
- Jewish Communities in the Muslim Countries of the Middle East; A Survey. London, o. J. [1950].
- As editor: Alexis de Tocqueville: Das Zeitalter der Gleichheit; Eine Auswahl aus dem Gesamtwerk. Kröner, Stuttgart, 1954.
- Kritik der Soziologie und andere Schriften zur Politik. Luchterhand, Neuwied am Rhein/Berlin 1969.
- Politik. Grundbegriffe und Analysen. Eine Auswahl aus dem Gesamtwerk in zwei Bänden. Hrsg. von Rainer Nicolaysen. Verlag für Berlin-Brandenburg, Berlin 2004, ISBN 978-3-935035-52-1.
