= Notes on James Mill =

"Notes on James Mill" is a text written by Karl Marx in 1844, originally part of the so-called "Paris Notebooks". In it Marx criticizes parts of James Mill's Elements of Political Economy. It forms the foundation for what later became his Economic and Philosophical Manuscripts of 1844.

"Notes on James Mill" is particularly important to the development of Marx's overall project because it gives insight into the concept of non-alienated labor. Marx here describes unalienated labor as labor in which one's personality is made objective in one's product and in which one enjoys contemplating the features of one's personality in the object one produces. As one has expressed one's talents and abilities in the productive process, the activity is authentic to one's character. It is not an activity one loathes. Marx further claims that one gains immediate satisfaction from the use and enjoyment of one's product - the satisfaction arising from the knowledge of having produced an object that corresponds to the needs of another human being. One can be said to have created an object that corresponds to the needs of another's essential nature. One's productive activity is a mediator between the needs of another person and the entire species. Marx suggests that this confirms the "communal" character of human nature, since individuals play an essential role in the affirmation of each other's nature.

== See also ==
- Marxism
- Marxist theory
- Marxist philosophy
