= Crack Capitalism =

- First edition
- Author: John Holloway
- Language: English
- Publisher: Pluto Press; BUAP
- Publication date: May 2010
- Publication place: United States
- ISBN: 9780745330082

Crack Capitalism (2010) is a book by sociologist John Holloway that carries on with the political ideas developed in his earlier Change the World Without Taking Power. Holloway sees the problem of political activism, in terms of those struggling "in-and-against" the system, as one of continuing to perpetuate capitalism through their commitment to abstract labour. Holloway defines "abstract labour" as labour which is subordinated exclusively to the demands of the market.

The real determinant of society is hidden behind the state and the economy: it is the way in which our everyday activity is organised, the subordination of our doing to the dictates of abstract labour, that is, of value, money, profit. It is this abstraction which is, after all, the very existence of the state. If we want to change society, we must stop the subordination of our activity to abstract labour, do something else.

He argues that from the Marxist stand-point of "two-fold nature of labour" or abstract labour and concrete labour, that anti-capitalist struggles should be about concrete doing being against labour, and not a struggle of labour against capital. In this respect it is critical of Leninism, orthodox Marxism and other attempts to address social change either exclusively in terms of socialising the means of production, through the formation of political parties or working within state structures.

The books name is derived from the analogy of ice breaking from struggles against capitalism. It sets out 33 theses which also touch upon dialectics, primitive accumulation, sexual dimorphisation and struggles in the global south.

The book was published by Pluto Press in 2010.

== See also ==
- Anti-globalization movement
- Autonomism
- Open Marxism
- Zapatistas
