= Open Marxism =

School of Marxist thought

Open Marxism is a school of Marxism that emerged as a distinct theoretical current in the post-World War II era, developing in both Western and Eastern Europe before being consolidated by a group of theorists in the United Kingdom in the late 1980s and early 1990s. It is defined by its emphasis on the "openness" of dialectical categories, the centrality of class struggle as a dynamic and indeterminate process, the unity of theory and practice, and a strong opposition to economic determinism, positivism, and scientism within Marxist theory.

The school of thought represents a critique of and alternative to dominant forms of Marxism, particularly structural Marxism and the state ideologies of Leninism and social democracy. The term was first used in the 1950s by intellectuals like Kostas Axelos in France and later by dissident theorists in Eastern Europe, such as the Praxis school in Yugoslavia, before being adopted by a group in Britain that included Werner Bonefeld, Richard Gunn, Kosmas Psychopedis, and John Holloway. Intellectually, Open Marxism draws on a "subterranean tradition" of Marxist thought that includes Rosa Luxemburg, the early Georg Lukács, Theodor W. Adorno, and Johannes Agnoli, as well as the Italian autonomist tradition of Mario Tronti and Antonio Negri.

Open Marxism's core tenets include a critique of "closed" theories that treat social structures as fixed or governed by deterministic laws, with historical materialism being a key target. Instead, it proposes a form of analysis where social forms—such as the state, money, or capital—are understood not as static structures but as "modes of existence" of the antagonistic relationship between capital and labour. A central target of its critique is fetishism, the process by which social relations under capitalism appear as relations between things. Open Marxism argues that many "closed" forms of Marxism reproduce this fetishism in their own theories by treating social categories as objective and independent of the class struggle that constitutes them. The project has had a substantial impact, particularly in Europe and Latin America, sparking numerous debates and critiques.

== Origins and context ==
The theoretical development of Open Marxism took place against the backdrop of a perceived "crisis of Marxism" that intensified throughout the 1980s. The first three volumes of Open Marxism were published between 1992 and 1995, a period that Werner Bonefeld described as one in which "the Soviet Empire had collapsed, and with great fanfare capitalism was duly celebrated as not only victorious but also as the epitome of civilisation that had now been confirmed as history’s end". This era was marked by the political ascendancy of the New Right in the West and the perceived accommodation of socialist parties to monetarism. Within intellectual circles, Marxism faced challenges from post-Marxism, which sought to announce "new times" that had supposedly rendered classical Marxist categories obsolete.

According to the editors of the foundational Open Marxism volumes, the target of these external and internal critiques was a specific variant of Marxist theory to which various kinds of "closure" applied. The Marxism that Louis Althusser had proclaimed to be in crisis in 1978 was specifically structural Marxism, a "sophisticated variety of determinism" which had previously been influential. Ironically, derivatives of structuralism, such as the Regulation Approach, flourished in the 1980s. These approaches often embraced a form of technological determinism and a teleological view of social change, particularly in their analyses of a transition from Fordism to post-Fordism. Other schools of thought, such as rational choice Marxism and critical realism, also moved away from dialectical analysis, with the latter group being described as animated by a slogan of "Back to Kant!".

Open Marxism was formulated as an "alternative reference-point" to these trends, which its proponents characterized as "closed Marxism" in a "scientistic and positivistic sense". It argued that by accepting the terms of existing reality and adopting the methods of positivist sociology, these other schools of Marxism had become blinkered. Their own crisis became a reflection of the crisis of the structures they analyzed, leading them to chase "the tail of the capitalist dog" rather than offering a revolutionary critique. Open Marxism thus sought to reassert the "dialectical dimension of Marxism", which it saw as the main casualty of these methodological shifts.

== Etymology and historical currents ==
The term "Open Marxism" has a complex history and has been used to denote several distinct but related theoretical projects since the 1950s. The common thread uniting these currents is an opposition to the dogmatic, closed systems of official Marxism and a commitment to understanding Marx's theory as an open-ended, critical, and revolutionary project.

=== Early usage in France ===
The term was first coined in the 1950s by the Greek-French philosopher Kostas Axelos within the circle of the journal Arguments. For Axelos, "Open Marxism" signified a theoretical current that, in opposition to Marxism–Leninism, refused to render Marxism an "ideology of power". His project sought an "opening" of Marxist thought to a productive dialogue with other philosophical traditions, particularly the work of Martin Heidegger, to explore fundamental questions of alienation and technology. Within the same intellectual milieu, other thinkers developed a parallel stream that understood "openness" as a turn toward the libertarian and anti-statist elements of Marx's thought. The work of Maximilien Rubel on the "anarchist Marx" and of Daniel Guérin on "libertarian communism" sought to synthesise Marxism and anarchism, arguing that Marx's core project was a critique of the state and money.

=== Eastern European dissidence ===
Independently, the term was used in Eastern Europe to describe the work of dissident Marxists who developed a critique of the official Marxism–Leninism of the Stalinist bureaucratic regimes.

- In Yugoslavia, the Praxis school, which included philosophers such as Gajo Petrović and Mihailo Marković, developed a "critical and open Marxism" rooted in the humanist themes of Marx's early manuscripts, focusing on the concepts of praxis and alienation. Their Korčula Summer School provided an important forum for dialogue between critical Marxists from East and West.
- In Poland, sociologists like Julian Hochfeld and Zygmunt Bauman advocated for an "Open Marxism" that would treat Marxist theses as scientifically verifiable claims rather than dogmas, opening Marxism to empirical sociological research and a re-evaluation of thinkers like Rosa Luxemburg.
- In Czechoslovakia, Karel Kosík's work, especially his Dialectics of the Concrete, advanced a highly original form of Open Marxism. Kosík combined a critique of "pseudoconcrete" reality (the world of fetishised appearances) with a deep engagement with phenomenology and existentialism, understanding dialectics as the destructive critique of reified social forms to reveal their basis in human praxis.

=== West Germany and Britain ===
In West Germany, the political theorist Johannes Agnoli employed the term "Open Marxism" in the 1980s to distinguish his critical reading of Marx from orthodox Marxism. Influenced by anarcho-syndicalism and left communism, Agnoli's work focused on a critique of the state and parliamentary democracy as capitalist political forms. For Agnoli, Open Marxism meant that concepts must remain open to the "heresy of reality" and that critique is primarily "negative and destructive".

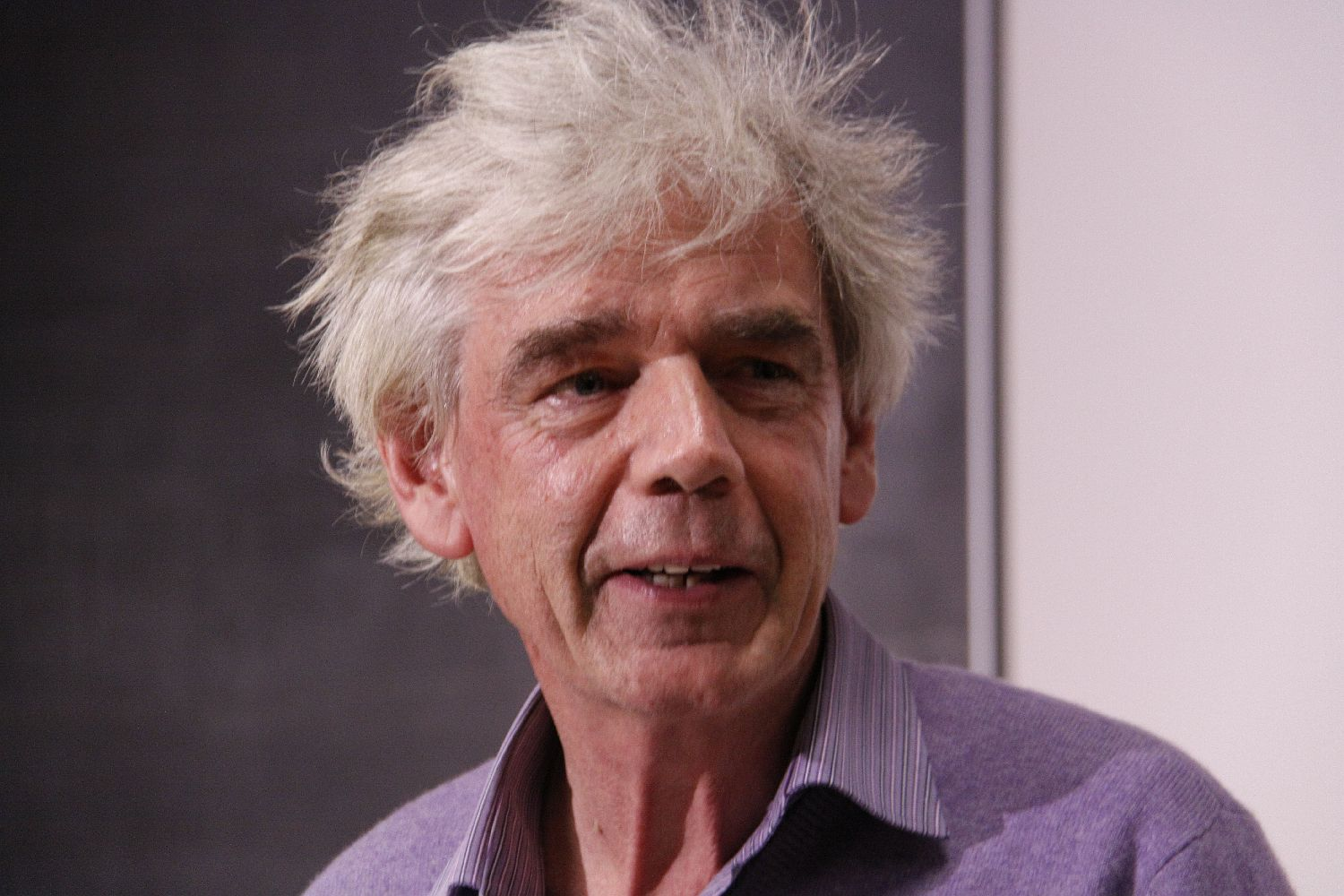
John Holloway, a key member of the Open Marxism school

It was this Agnoli-inflected version that was carried into Britain by Werner Bonefeld, Agnoli's former student. In homage to his teacher, Bonefeld applied the term "Open Marxism" to the work of a group of theorists associated with the Conference of Socialist Economists (CSE), including Simon Clarke, Richard Gunn, and John Holloway. This current, which was consolidated in the three-volume Open Marxism series (1992–1995), gave the term its most systematic and widely known formulation. For this group, "openness" referred specifically to the "openness of Marxist categories themselves" to the dynamic and unpredictable nature of class struggle.

== Intellectual influences ==
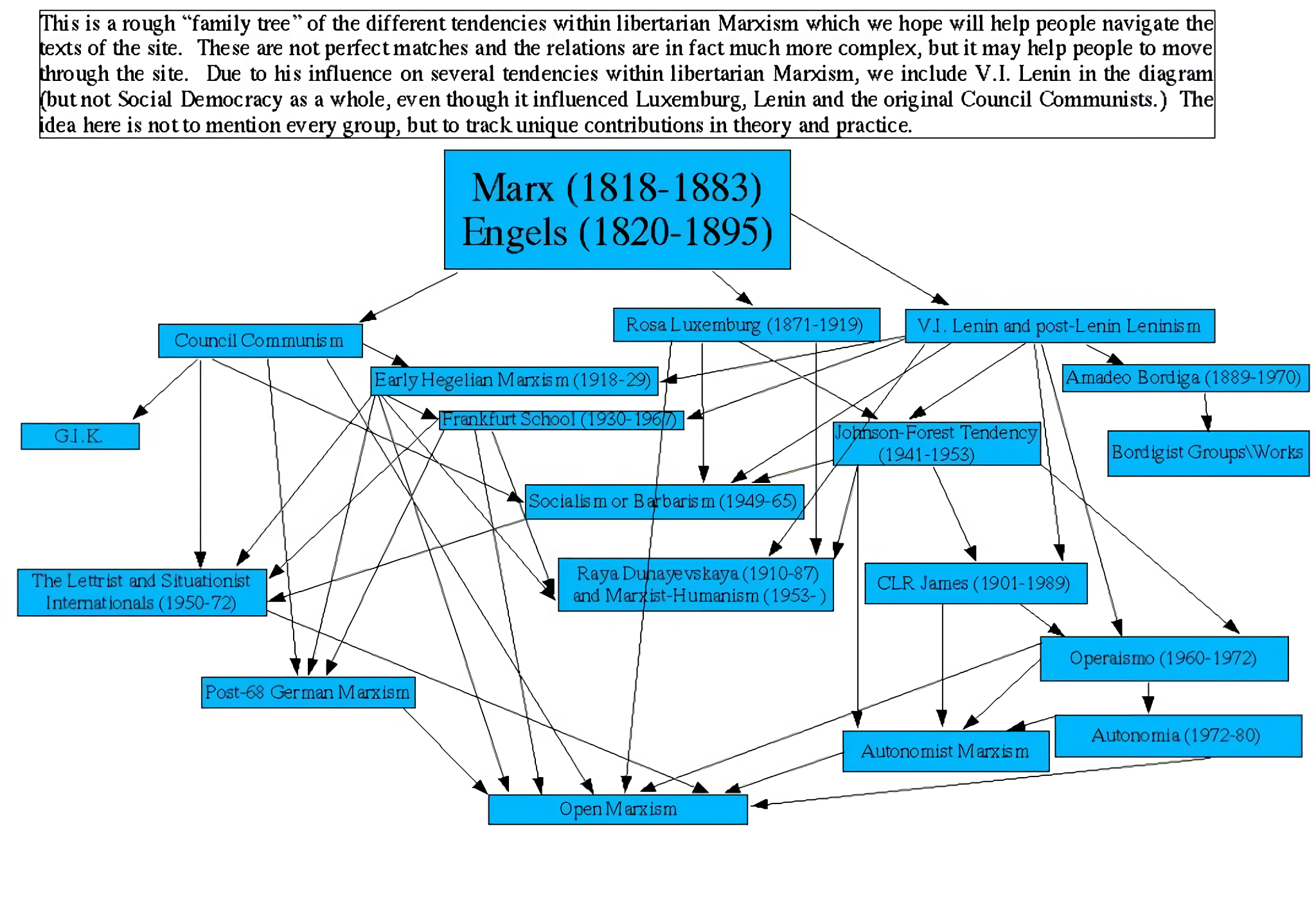
Diagram of influences on Open Marxism

Proponents of Open Marxism state that the approach is not "wholly novel" but draws on a "subterranean tradition" of Marxist thought that has existed alongside more mainstream and academic variants. This tradition was renewed in the 1970s through the republication and translation of these earlier works, and through a series of methodological debates. In Britain, debates within the CSE "reopened discussion of categories such as value, labour process, the state, world market, social form, etc., upon the soil of a Keynesianism in crisis". The initial Open Marxism volumes of the 1990s identified a lineage of key figures whose work informs their perspective, including:

- Rosa Luxemburg
- The early Georg Lukács
- Karl Korsch
- Ernst Bloch
- Theodor W. Adorno and the Frankfurt School
- Isaak Illich Rubin
- Evgeny Pashukanis
- Roman Rosdolsky
- Johannes Agnoli
- The Italian autonomist tradition, particularly the work of Raniero Panzieri, Mario Tronti, and Antonio Negri on class composition.
- The Italian feminist and autonomist critique of unwaged labour, especially the work of Mariarosa Dalla Costa.
- A critical re-engagement with the work of Georg Wilhelm Friedrich Hegel, arguing that his later work was a conservative betrayal of his earlier radicalism.

For a brief period, this marginal tradition moved toward the centre of Marxist discussion, fueled by the widespread class conflict of the late 1960s and early 1970s. With the exhaustion of that conflict, the tradition was "remarginalised" as more scientistic currents (such as capital-logic and structuralism) came to the fore. One of the stated aims of the Open Marxism project was therefore to "reopen a space ... wherein voices of theoretical and practical critique can gain new strength".

== Major themes ==
=== Emancipating Marxism: theory as critique ===
A central theme of the project is the "emancipation of Marx," which has a dual meaning: first, freeing Marxist thought from the dogmatic and positivistic legacy of "scientific Marxism," and second, understanding Marxism itself as an inherently emancipatory project. This entails a radical understanding of the unity of theory and practice. Open Marxism rejects the orthodox view of theory as a "scientific guide" to be applied externally to a separate realm of practice. Such a dualism, it argues, reproduces the reification of bourgeois thought by treating theory as a "thing" and the social world as an external "object" of inquiry.

Instead, Open Marxism defines itself as a negative, destructive critique that begins from "experience," specifically the experience of resistance and opposition to the "inhuman conditions which are the reality of capitalist relations of exploitation". As John Holloway formulates it, the theory's starting point is the "scream of refusal" against a contradictory and oppressive world. Marxism is therefore understood not as a "theory of society" but as a "theory against society." This negative, critical stance is seen as the only way to comprehend a "perverted social existence" and the theory's own role within it.

=== Critique of "Closed Marxism" and institutional Marxism ===
The primary target of Open Marxism's critique is "Closed Marxism," defined as any form of Marxism that "accepts the horizons of a given world as its own theoretical horizons" or "announces a determinism which is causalist or teleological." This includes the various forms of "institutional Marxism"—the state ideologies of Soviet-type societies, the reformism of social democracy, and the academic structuralism of thinkers like Althusser.

A major focus of this critique is historical materialism, particularly in the deterministic form derived from Marx's 1859 Preface to A Contribution to the Critique of Political Economy. Open Marxists argue that this model, which posits a mechanical causal relationship between an economic "base" and a political-ideological "superstructure", was elevated to a "holy scripture" in orthodox Marxism, becoming an "abstract universal framework" that obscured the centrality of class struggle. Similarly, Open Marxism rejects the Althusserian notion of an "epistemological break" separating an early, "ideological" Marx from a late, "scientific" Marx. Instead, proponents argue for the fundamental unity of Marx's thought, seeing his entire body of work as a single, developing theoretical edifice. They read Marx's work in its entirety, acknowledging its contradictions and limitations without attempting to construct a "monolithic mythology". For Open Marxists, Marx's work is not a closed, finished system but is "full of open problems" and serves as a model for critical thinking.

=== Form-analysis and dialectics ===
A central methodological tool of Open Marxism is a specific approach to form-analysis, which understands social forms (like the state, money, or value) not as static structures or "species" of a genus, but as "modes of existence" of the class antagonism between capital and labour. A social reality exists only in and through the particular form(s) it takes. The separation between the "economic" and the "political", for example, is not a division between two distinct spheres but a "difference subsisting within, and constituted by, an active unity" of class struggle.

This approach is grounded in a dialectical method that, according to Helmut Reichelt, Marx developed in his early works but later "concealed" in Capital to make it more accessible. The method involves grasping social forms as "objective illusions" that are simultaneously real and mystifying. The task of critique is to trace the genesis of these forms back to their origin in human practice, or work. This leads to an understanding of dialectics not as a set of external laws applied to society, but as the self-contradictory movement of social practice itself, an "assault on identity" and a "theory of contradiction".

=== Fetishism as process ===
Open Marxism reinterprets the theory of commodity fetishism not as an accomplished fact but as a continuous process. The "hard" interpretation of fetishism, common in orthodox Marxism, views social relations as completely objectified, turning humans into passive bearers of structures. This leads to a political dilemma where revolution seems impossible without the intervention of an external vanguard.

In contrast, John Holloway proposes that fetishism should be understood as a process of fetishisation: a constant, active struggle by capital to impose thing-like forms upon fluid, antagonistic social relations. This process is always met with its opposite, defetishisation: the struggle to break down these reified forms and reassert the primacy of human sociality. From this perspective, the categories of political economy (value, money, capital, the state) are not closed, objective things, but "open" forms of the class struggle. As Werner Bonefeld argues, these fetishised forms represent human practice existing "against itself," or "in the mode of being denied." This solves the dualism of structure versus struggle by understanding structures as nothing but the alienated, struggled-over forms of struggle itself.

=== Critique of the state and party ===
Open Marxism offers a radical critique of the traditional left's approach to political organisation, rejecting what it calls the "statist myth of socialism". It opposes the view, common to both Leninism and social democracy, that the state and the political party are historically necessary and neutral instruments for achieving socialism. Instead, it sees these political forms as historically specific to bourgeois society and as expressions of the antagonistic capital-labour relation. The state is not an autonomous entity above society or an instrument to be captured, but the political form of capitalist social relations themselves—a "capitalist state".

Likewise, the vanguard party form is critiqued as a bourgeois political structure that reproduces the division between leaders and led, mirrors the hierarchy of the capitalist workplace, and ultimately acts to discipline and contain class struggle rather than unleash it. In place of the party and the state, Open Marxism emphasizes autonomous forms of self-organisation that emerge directly from struggle, such as workers' councils, assemblies, and communes. These forms are seen as prefiguring a communist society by embodying principles of direct democracy and dissolving the separation between the political and the social. The goal is not the seizure of state power, but its abolition and the creation of a "society of the free and equal".

=== Class as a negative category ===
Open Marxism rejects sociological conceptions of class that treat it as a static category or location within a social structure. Instead, it conceptualizes class as a contradictory and antagonistic social relation. Crucially, this relation is asymmetrical: "capital depends upon labour, for its valorisation, but labour for its part in no way depends, necessarily, on capital's rule."

Following Theodor W. Adorno, class is understood as a "negative" and "critical concept" that belongs to a "perverted world of social relations". The working class is not an "ontologically privileged subject of history" to be glorified, but a negative category of a false and contradictory society. As such, the aim of class struggle is not to affirm the working class but to abolish it, along with all classes. The struggle is not waged as the working class but against being a working class. Drawing on the autonomist tradition, Open Marxism "inverts the class perspective". This involves shifting analytical focus from capital's process of valorisation (the expansion of value through the command of labour) to the working class's project of self-valorisation. Self-valorisation refers to the autonomous struggles through which the working class constitutes its own forms of sociality, independent of and against capital. This concept expands the notion of class struggle beyond resistance to include the positive, creative constitution of new ways of being.

== Later developments and fourth volume ==
After the publication of the first three volumes in the early 1990s, the Open Marxism project continued to evolve. A fourth volume, Open Marxism 4: Against a Closing World, was published in 2020, reflecting on the theoretical developments and political concerns of the intervening decades. The editors of the fourth volume, Ana Cecilia Dinerstein, Alfonso García Vela, Edith González, and John Holloway, situated their work in a context of a "closing of the world", marked by the rise of walls, borders, resurgent nationalism, and neo-fascism.

The fourth volume continued the project's core aims: "to (re)think how to break the descent into barbarism; to break capital by venturing through a theoretical exploration to free the critique of capitalist labour economy from economic dogmas...; to open up to the movement of struggle and to understand itself as part of that movement." New themes and influences are evident, including a deeper engagement with the Zapatista movement as a practical example of a "revolution against the grain" that rejects the vanguardist model and focuses on autonomy. The concept of mutual recognition, drawn from Hegel's Phenomenology of Spirit, is explored by Richard Gunn and Adrian Wilding as a "unifying theoretical and uniting principle of the Left". Ana Cecilia Dinerstein introduces a "critical theory of hope" based on the work of Ernst Bloch, arguing that contemporary struggles for social reproduction contain a "utopian dimension" that affirms life as a form of negation against capital.

The relationship between Open Marxism and the Frankfurt School is also examined more explicitly. Frederick Harry Pitts outlines the connections and complementarities between Open Marxism and the New Reading of Marx (Neue Marx-Lektüre), both of which draw on Frankfurt School social theory. Mario Schäbel and Alfonso García Vela both engage critically with the perceived "subjectivism" of Open Marxism, contrasting it with Adorno's emphasis on the "primacy of the object."

== See also ==
- Antipositivism
- Anti-Stalinist left
- Autonomism
- Centrist Marxism
- Democratic confederalism
- Humanist Marxism
- Hegelian Marxism
- Neozapatismo
- Parametric determinism
- Post-Marxism
- State derivation
- Third camp
- Value criticism
- Western Marxism
