= Johannes Agnoli =

German political scientist of Italian descent

Johannes Agnoli (22 February 1925 in Valle di Cadore, Eastern Dolomites – 4 May 2003 in San Quirico di Moriano near Lucca) was a German political scientist of Italian descent. He analysed the modern democratic state in a post-marxist and structuralist way, trying to show how modern parliamentarism transforms capital interests into illusionary democratic decisions. The mechanisms of party rule and parliamentary procedures lead to an exclusion of social conflicts from political processes and to pacification of the inherent antagonism within society by manipulation.

== Biography ==
Agnoli grew up in Belluno, northern Italy. As a pupil, he became an admirer of Benito Mussolini's fascism and a member of the fascist youth organization. Graduating from school in 1943, he volunteered for the Waffen-SS and served in Yugoslavia to combat Partisans. In May 1945 he was captured by the British near Trieste and became a prisoner of war in the Moascar denazification camp in Egypt. In the re-education classes, he aided in the philosophy course using Wilhelm Windelband's History of Philosophy thus also learning German. Released in the summer of 1948, he moved to Urach in Baden-Württemberg where he worked at a sawmill. Agnoli received a veteran's scholarship to study at the University of Tübingen. Naturalized as a German in 1955, Agnoli did his doctorate in political science about Giambattista Vico's philosophy of law under the supervision of Eduard Spranger.

In 1957, Agnoli also joined the Social Democratic Party of Germany (SPD); he would be expelled in 1961, for being a member of the Socialist German Student Union, the former college organization of the SPD, which then rebelled against the party. In 1960, he started working as the assistant of Ferdinand A. Hermens, the only political scientist at the University of Cologne at the time. In Cologne Agnoli got to know his future wife, Barbara Görres. Görres's devoutly Catholic family at first objected to her relationship with Agnoli, an atheist, even calling on Hermens to intervene. The two married in 1962. After it was reported that Agnoli called on the West German government to recognize the socialist German Democratic Republic (East Germany), he came into conflict with Hermens and his contract was not renewed. Wolfgang Abendroth, a renowned German left-wing academic, recommended Agnoli to Ossip K. Flechtheim of the Otto Suhr Institute at the Free University of Berlin. Agnoli worked as Flechtheim's assistant until becoming a professor in his own right in 1972.

In 1991, Agnoli was retired. He moved to his vacation home in Lucca, Tuscany – without his wife. He had bought the house in the 1970s. From 2000, his grown-up children cared for him, as he started losing his health. He died there in 2003. In 2004, his wife Barbara published a biography of Agnoli titled Johannes Agnoli: Eine biografische Skizze (Johannes Agnoli: A biographical sketch).

== The Transformation of Democracy ==
In 1967, Die Transformation der Demokratie (The Transformation of Democracy), the book most commonly associated with Agnoli, was published. However, he only wrote one essay, constituting about one third of the book, with the social psychologist Peter Brückner authoring the rest. This book was read very widely in the German student movement of 1968, leading Die Zeit to refer to it as the movement's "Bible".

In his essay, Agnoli discusses the question, why parliamentarianism does not allow the interests of the working population to be reflected in political power and in decisions in their favour. He argues that, historically, fascism was an earlier method of repressing social unrest by integrating the masses by destroying parliamentarianism as soon as interests of labour seemed to threaten capital interests. However, this did not turn out to be a long-term solution. Capital had to revert to parliamentarian forms of government, according to Agnoli. He argues that it was able to do so by "transforming" parliamentary rule to exclude the possibility of revolutionary insurrection. He names several methods: the prohibition of communist parties, such as the Communist Party of Germany in West Germany; giving additional power to the executive branch; the use of election threshold, which prevent small parties from entering parliaments; and finally plurality voting systems which further marginalize small radical parties. This causes a parliamentary system to become no more than a pluralistic version of one-party rule, according to Agnoli. Elections only determine which political figure gets to run policies, but the decision has already been taken before. He viewed West Germany as the prototype of such a "transformed" parliamentary democracy, which no longer allows for revolutionary action, not even a serious opposition.

== Bibliography ==
- Johannes Agnoli, Theses on the Transformation of Democracy and on the Extra-Parliamentary Opposition, Viewpoint Magazine 4 (October 2014). Retrieved 17 February 2016.

== See also ==
- Open Marxism
