= John Holloway (sociologist) =

Irish sociologist (born 1947)

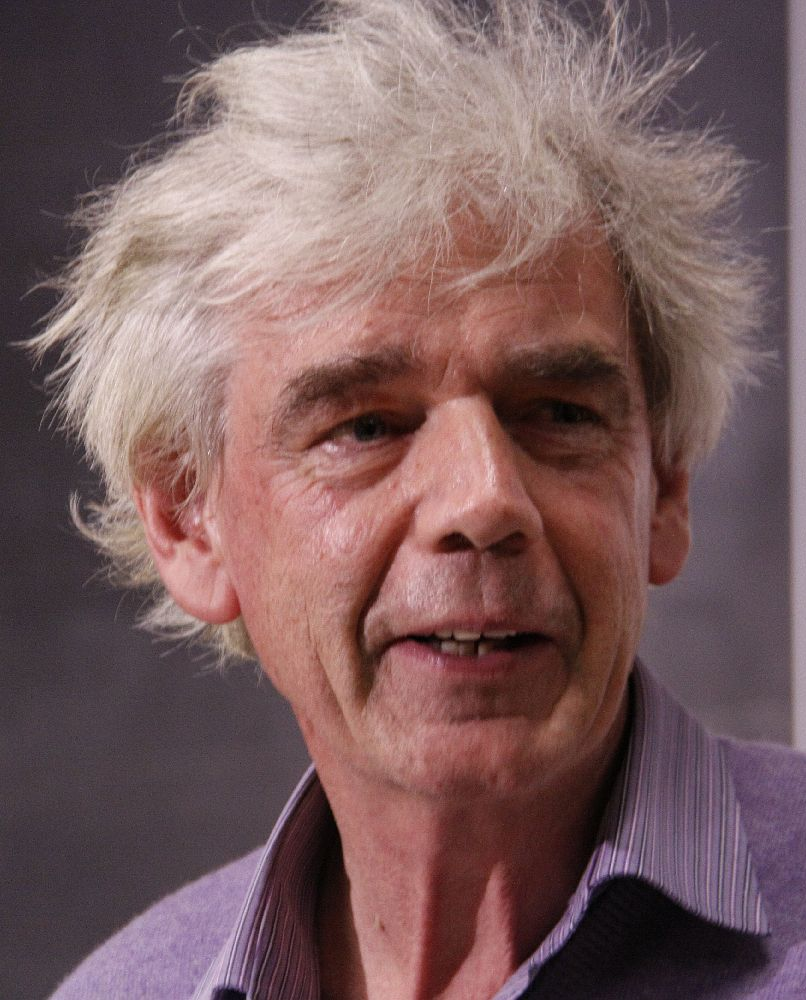
- Holloway in 2011
- Born: July 26, 1947; Dublin, Ireland
- Education: University of Edinburgh (PhD, 1975)
- Scientific career
- Fields: Sociology
- Workplaces: University of Edinburgh; Autonomous University of Puebla
- Thesis: Harmonisation and Co-ordination of Social Security in the European Communities (1975)
- Doctoral advisors: John David Bawden Mitchell; Henry Drucker

John Holloway (born 1947) is an Irish Marxist lawyer, sociologist and philosopher, whose work is closely associated with the Zapatista movement in Mexico, his home since 1991. It has also been taken up by some intellectuals associated with the piqueteros in Argentina; the Abahlali baseMjondolo movement in South Africa and the Anti-Globalization Movement in Europe and North America. He is currently a professor at the Institute for Humanities and Social Sciences at the Autonomous University of Puebla.

== Work ==
During the 1970s, Holloway was an influential member of the Conference of Socialist Economists, particularly in his support of an approach to the state as a social form constituted ultimately by class struggle between capital and the working class. This approach was developed primarily through the critical appropriation of aspects of the German state derivation debate of the early 1970s, in particular the work of Joachim Hirsch, and led him and Sol Picciotto to publish "State and Capital: A Marxist Debate", an anthology of texts from the German debate with a critical introduction. This conception of state, social form and class struggle, within the Conference of Socialist Economists developed a current that ultimately gave rise to the Open Marxism school of thought in which Holloway remained a significant participant. This current rejects both traditional Marxist ideas of state monopoly capitalism and structuralist innovations such as Poulantzas' Althusserian state theory and the Regulation school, and affirms the centrality of the class relation between capital and working class, as a struggle.

His 2002 book, Change the World Without Taking Power, has been much debated in Marxist, anarchist and anti-capitalist circles, and contends that the possibility of revolution resides not in the seizure of state apparatuses, but in day-to-day acts of abject refusal of capitalist society – so-called 'anti-power', or 'the scream' as he puts it. Holloway's thesis has been analysed by thinkers like Tariq Ali and Slavoj Žižek. Critics and supporters alike consider Holloway broadly Autonomist in outlook, and his work is often compared and contrasted with that of figures such as Antonio Negri, although the two have their disagreements.

His 2010 book Crack Capitalism carries on with the political ideas developed in Change the World Without Taking Power. Holloway sees the problem of political activism, in terms of people struggling “in-and-against” the system, as one of continuing to perpetuate capitalism through their commitment to abstract labour. He argues that from the Marxist stand-point of “two-fold nature of labour” or abstract labour and concrete labour, that anti-capitalist struggles should be about concrete doing against labour, and not a struggle of labour against capital.

Holloway also originally contributed to and produced a foreword for the influential In and Against the State, updated in 2021 to reflect on the Corbyn movement.

== Influences on culture ==
=== Music ===
Composer Reynaldo Young acknowledges in the performance notes of his piece "ay'tik" that Change the World Without Taking Power is the "theoretical source which the strategic principles of this score came from." Both Holloway and the composer attended the world premiere of the piece, which took place on 26 July 2002 in Bretton Hall, West Yorkshire.

== See also ==
- Open Marxism
- Autonomism
- British left

== Bibliography ==
=== Books in English ===
- State and Capital: A Marxist Debate (1978), ISBN 0-7131-5987-1, ed. with Sol Picciotto
- Social Policy Harmonisation in the European Community (1981), ISBN 0-566-00196-9
- Post-Fordism and Social Form: A Marxist Debate on the Post-Fordist State (1991), ISBN 0-333-54393-9, ed. with Werner Bonefeld
- Global Capital, National State, and the Politics of Money (1995), ISBN 0-312-12466-X, ed. with Werner Bonefeld
- Open Marxism: Emancipating Marx (1995), ISBN 0-7453-0864-3, ed. with Werner Bonefeld, Richard Gunn and Kosmas Psychopedis
- Zapatista!: Reinventing Revolution in Mexico (1998), ISBN 0-7453-1178-4, ed. with Eloína Peláez
- Change the World Without Taking Power (2002), ISBN 0-7453-1864-9
- Negativity and Revolution: Adorno and Political Activism (2008) ISBN 978-0-7453-2836-2, ed. with Fernando Matamoros & Sergio Tischler
- Crack Capitalism Pluto Press (2010) ISBN 0-7453-3008-8 ISBN 978-0745330082
- In, Against, and Beyond Capitalism: The San Francisco Lectures PM Press (2016) ISBN 978-1629631097
- We are the Crisis of Capital: A John Holloway Reader (2018) ISBN 978-1629632254
- Hope in Hopeless Times (2022) ISBN 978-0-74534-734-9

=== Chapters in English ===
- "The Grammar of Capital." In The Oxford Handbook of Karl Marx (2019). ISBN 9780190695545

=== Online articles ===
- Going in the Wrong Direction or Mephistopheles: Not Saint Francis of Assisi
- Twelve Theses on Changing the World without taking Power
- The concept of power and the Zapatistas
- Dignity's revolt
- Change the World Without Taking Power, complete online text on Libcom.org
- Walking We Ask Questions, 2005
- Against and Beyond the State
- The Politics of Dignity and the Politics of Poverty, 2010
