= Arguments Group =

Circle of intellectuals based in post-war France aligned with Marxist humanism

The Arguments group was a collection of French intellectuals, mostly ex-Communists, who were active in the late 1950s and early 1960s. The group, whose members had been shaped by their participation in the French Resistance and subsequent disillusionment with the French Communist Party, particularly after the Soviet suppression of the Hungarian Revolution of 1956, sought to revitalize Marxism by engaging with new intellectual currents and social phenomena. Many of the group's members held academic positions in Paris, and their work had a significant influence on the development of the New Left.

== Key figures and influences ==
Key figures in the Arguments group included Kostas Axelos, Francois Chatelet, Jean Duvignaud, Pierre Fougeyrollas, Henri Lefebvre, and Edgar Morin. The group coalesced around the journal Arguments, founded in late 1956. Modeled on the Italian journal Argomenti, Arguments aimed to cultivate open Marxist debate and discussion. It welcomed contributions from a diverse range of perspectives, including Stalinists, Trotskyists, humanist Marxists, and even Sartreans. This non-sectarian approach distinguished Arguments as a significant platform for intellectual exchange during this period.

Beyond the journal, the group also published a book series. This series included translations of key works of Western Marxism, like György Lukács's History and Class Consciousness and Karl Korsch's Marxism and Philosophy. They also published studies by members of the group and texts challenging Stalinist orthodoxy. Additionally, the group engaged with contemporary social science, attending lectures by American sociologists and later contributing to the fields of sociology and political science.

The group's thought was significantly shaped by:

- Existentialism: particularly the works of Jean-Paul Sartre, whose ideas on subjectivity and action informed the group's efforts to move beyond traditional Marxist philosophy.
- The Frankfurt School: Notably the works of Herbert Marcuse, whose critiques of advanced capitalist society resonated with the Arguments group's own analyses.
- Structuralism: While initially critical of structuralism, the group's engagement with thinkers like Claude Lévi-Strauss and Jacques Lacan contributed to the development of a more nuanced understanding of the relationship between structure and agency.

== Themes ==
The Arguments group was centrally concerned with Karl Marx's notion of the transcendence of philosophy. They critically examined Karl Marx's early writings, especially his critique of philosophy in his Doctoral Thesis, where he states, "the world's becoming philosophical is at the same time philosophy's becoming worldly, that its realization is at the same time its loss". The group grappled with the meaning of this "realization" of philosophy, questioning whether Marx had moved beyond traditional philosophical thought and whether Marxism needed revision to achieve this transcendence.

In addressing these questions, the Arguments group turned to existentialist thinkers like Martin Heidegger and Jean-Paul Sartre. They engaged with existentialist ideas of subjectivity, the relationship between theory and action, and the critique of alienation. They saw in existentialism a way to understand the lived experience of individuals in modern society, particularly the experience of alienation.

=== Axelos ===
Kostas Axelos edited Arguments and later the group's book series. He proposed a "planetary thought" characterized by openness, fragmentation, and poetic expression, drawing on figures like Pascal, Nietzsche, and Rimbaud. He critiqued Marx's concept of "homo faber", arguing that it reduced subjectivity to tool-making and did not adequately account for the spiritual dimension of human experience. Axelos saw Marx's concept of alienation as flawed and believed that Marx did not successfully integrate materialism and spiritualism. For Axelos, Marx's thought remained rooted in the Western metaphysical tradition and did not constitute a new type of thinking. He advocated for a rethinking of the relationship between philosophy and the world, suggesting that Marx had not fully moved beyond traditional philosophical frameworks.

=== Fougeyrollas ===
Pierre Fougeyrollas advanced a "fragmentary thought" that rejected systematization, influenced by Heidegger. He emphasized the dialectic not as a rigid method but as a critical tool for understanding totality and contradiction. He advocated for a constantly evolving and self-critical understanding of the world and human experience.

=== Lefebvre ===
Henri Lefebvre developed the concept of "everyday life" as a realm of alienated experience under advanced capitalism. Informed by Sartre, he saw everyday life as both a site of alienation and potential resistance. Lefebvre explored the ways in which capitalism shapes the daily experiences of individuals through "controlled consumption" and bureaucracy. He advocated for a "metaphilosophy" that engaged with lived experience, recognizing the significance of seemingly mundane aspects of social life. Lefebvre argued that to transform everyday life and achieve true human emancipation, a "permanent cultural revolution" was required.
