= Kostas Axelos =

Greek-French philosopher

- Born: 26 June 1924; Athens, Greece
- Died: 4 February 2010 (aged 85); Paris, France

Education
- Education: University of Athens; University of Paris (PhD, 1959)
- Doctoral advisor: Maurice de Gandillac; Jean Wahl

Philosophical work
- Era: 20th-century philosophy
- Region: Western philosophy
- School: Continental philosophy, Western Marxism, phenomenology
- Institutions: CNRS; École Pratique des Hautes Études; University of Paris
- Main interests: History of philosophy, praxis, techné, social alienation
- Notable ideas: Open Marxism, the game of the world, planetary thinking, mondialisation, errance

Kostas Axelos (also spelled Costas Axelos; Greek: Κώστας Αξελός; 26 June 1924 – 4 February 2010) was a Greek-French philosopher.

== Biography ==
Axelos was born in Athens in 1924 to a doctor and a woman from an old Athenian bourgeois family, and attended high school at the French Institute of Athens, the German School of Athens, and the Varvakeio High School. He enrolled in the School of Law of the University of Athens in order to pursue studies in law and economics due to dissatisfaction with the philosophy taught at the School of Philosophy of the University of Athens, but did not attend. With the onset of World War II Axelos got involved in politics. Then during the German and Italian occupation he participated in the Greek Resistance, and later on in the prelude of the Greek Civil War, as an organiser and journalist affiliated with the Communist Party (1941–1945). He was later expelled from the Communist Party and condemned to death by the right-wing government. He was arrested but managed to escape.

At the end of 1945, Axelos moved to Paris, France, on the Mataroa voyage, with around 200 other persecuted intellectuals, where he studied philosophy at the Sorbonne and lived most of his life. From 1950 to 1957 he worked as a researcher in the philosophy branch of CNRS, where he was writing his two dissertations, and subsequently proceeded to work in École Pratique des Hautes Études. From 1962 to 1973, Axelos taught philosophy at the Sorbonne, and met Jacques Lacan, Pablo Picasso, and Martin Heidegger. His 1959 primary doctoral thesis Marx, penseur de la technique (translated as Marx, the Man Who Thinks Through Technique) tried to provide an understanding of modern technology based on the thought of Heidegger and Marx and was very influential in the 1960s, alongside the philosophy of Herbert Marcuse. Axelos' secondary thesis was on Heraclitus and was eventually published in 1962 as Héraclite et la philosophie: La première saisie de l'être en devenir de la totalité (Heraclitus and Philosophy: The First Grasp of the Being-in-Becoming of Totality).

Axelos was a collaborator on, columnist with, and subsequently editor of the magazine Arguments (1956–1962). He founded and, since 1960, has run the book series Arguments in Les Éditions de Minuit. The journal had links to other European publications, e.g., Praxis in Yugoslavia and Das Argument in Germany, and pursued a non-sectarian Marxist approach. He has published texts mostly in French, but also in Greek and German. A notable book he wrote was Le Jeu du Monde (The Play of the World), where Axelos argues for a pre-ontological status of play. Because of this activity and connection to major European intellectual figures, Axelos played a central role in French and European intellectual life for over 50 years.

== Philosophical work ==
Kostas Axelos tried to reconcile the ancient thinking of Heraclitus with the modern thinking of Marx, Nietzsche, Freud, Heidegger, and others in order to gain a new perspective on some of the problems of Marxism during his time. Axelos used Heraclitus' philosophy as the primary basis for assessing the work of Marx and Engels. Axelos contributed to the growing interest of contemporary researchers in the Pre-Socratics, and generally for ancient Greek philosophy, through his reading of the role of concepts in interpreting the world.

Axelos' starting point was the argument in Marx's thesis that "the world's becoming philosophical is at the same time philosophy's becoming worldly, that its realization is at the same time its loss" In his dissertation Marx, the Man Who Thinks Through Technique and in his work Alienation, Techne, and Praxis in the Thought of Karl Marx, Axelos draws heavily on the Economic and Philosophical Manuscripts, reading them with the help of Heidegger's and Nietzsche's concepts. He explored the consequences of "alienation" in history, such as the effects of the division of labor, private property and capital, in terms of the "externalization" of human beings in an "alien reality." Axelos tried to relate these descriptions of alienation and loss of "play" to Heidegger's concept of technological "enframing as standing-reserve [bestand]. For Axelos, this expanded understanding of technology became a way of interrogating both modern society and Marxism

Following the example of his teacher Heidegger, who employed a poetic style of philosophy, Axelos often used a continuous flow of aphoristic statements to relate phenomena together, attempting to listen to "the game of the world". Using this method to approach the "horizons of the world," Axelos unpacks the "mythological elements" of Marxism and especially criticizes tendencies toward meta-narrative that he considers nihilistic and anthropocentric. Axelos' two doctoral theses and his book Towards Planetary Thinking (1964) were arranged as a trilogy—The Unfolding of Errance.

Axelos continued to engage with contemporary thinking and the emerging global world by seeking to discover the "unseen horizon encircling all things" (1964), further refining his method as a continuous wandering through the splintered "wholeness" that surrounds contemporary human beings. To describe this state of "being-in-becoming," Axelos uses the term "the game." This is the basis of Axelos' second trilogy entitled The Unfolding of the Game (« Le deploiement de jeu »), which includes the books: The Game of the World (1969), Towards an Ethics of Problematics (1972), and Contribution to Logic (1977).

Finally, Axelos' third trilogy is entitled The Unfolding of an Investigation, and consists of the books: Arguments of an Investigation (1969), Horizons of the World (1974), and Issues at Stake (1979). In employing both Marx and Freud, Axelos did not carelessly reject their arguments despite trying to "liberate the vital forces" within them (1964), as his autobiography notes: "it remains to ask again, to extrapolate the Marxian and Freudian intuitions" (1997). The focus of the searches is still the "set-game of sets," especially in the context of the "end of history" debates. This is restated as follows: "Since everything has been said and contradicted in a specific language, mainly the metaphysical language of philosophy and the language of anti-philosophy that subverts the metaphysical, is there is still something of meaning to say, and in what language?" (1974).

After completion of the third trilogy, Axelos published Open Systems (1984) as an extension of the concepts that he had hitherto employed on "exposures in the world 'with a means of capturing and writing also' the different and enormous 'wanderings' of the open world," i.e., what is not present-at-hand but what is "overwhelming more people and more historical societies."

Axelos' texts were almost all written as meta-philosophical epilogues with the intention not to "passively endure our time: the inquiries that we have launched require us to look and see both near and far" (1997). The ultimate goal was to write "in a speech poetic and thoughtful, a fervent life" (1997).

=== Open Marxism ===
Axelos' approach to thinking and philosophizing can be called 'Open Marxism,' a term Axelos himself used. However, Axelos identified aspects of modern technological thinking that needed to be criticized within Marx's texts, leading him to read Marx as the culminating figure of Western metaphysics (paralleling Heidegger's assessment of Nietzsche). Open Marxism is therefore an attempt to transcend the political-ideological role of Marxism and to instead "pose fruitful questions and demystify 'existing realizations.'" Axelos stressed that all kinds of action (political or otherwise) cannot be defined a priori. Axelos' thought attempts to question all forms of closure and is a form of open systems theory (as opposed to closed systems theory). Elsewhere, he called this "planetary thinking" (1964).

=== The concept of "play" ===
Axelos uses the concept of "play" (le jeu) both as an ontological category (the "system of systems") and as an ethical ideal for an unalienated society. Axelos argues, following Marx, that the opposition between work (necessity) and play (freedom) needs to be abolished, but recognizes that this would be both a concrete and ontological "world-play" (le jeu du monde) or errance. He also argues, following Heidegger, that play is the meaning of Being which has been forgotten in the modern world (the oblivion of Being). Critiquing overly determinist accounts of globalization, for example, Axelos argues that it is a process of world-forming (mondialisation) which is more open to transformation than classical Marxists theorists often admit. The relational aspect of play is what links human activity with the activity of the world, and the various systems of human life (magic, myth, religion, poetry, politics, philosophy, science) together and to the world. Thus, play is not at all a childish vocation for Axelos.

== Bibliography ==
French bibliography

- Heidegger, Martin. Qu'est-ce que la philosophie? (What is Philosophy?). Trans. from German with Jean Beaufret, Gallimards, 1957.
- Lukács, Georg. Histoire et conscience de classe (History and Class Consciousness). Trans. (with Preface) from German with Jacqueline Bois, Minuit, 1960.
- Marx, penseur de la technique: De l'aliénation de l'homme à la conquête du monde (Marx, the Man Who Thinks Through Technique: From the Alienation of Man to the Conquest of the World, The Unfolding of Errance Part 1), Paris, UGE/Les Éditions de Minuit, 1961.
- Héraclite et la philosophie: La première saisie de l'être en devenir de la totalité (Heraclitus and Philosophy: The First Grasp of the Being-in-Becoming of Totality, The Unfolding of Errance Part 2), 1962.
- Arguments d'une recherche, Paris, Les Éditions de Minuit, 1963.
- Vers la pensée planétaire: Le devenir-pensée du monde et le devenir-monde de la pensée (Toward Planetary Thinking: Thought Becoming World, World Becoming Thought, The Unfolding of Errance Part 3), Paris, Les Éditions de Minuit, 1964.
- Le Jeu du monde (The Play of the World, The Unfolding of the Game Part 1), Paris, Les Éditions de Minuit, 1969.
- Arguments d'une recherche (Arguments of an Investigation, The Unfolding of an Investigation Part 1), Paris, Les Éditions de Minuit, 1969.
- Pour une éthique problématique (For an Ethics of Problematics, The Unfolding of the Game Part 2), Paris, Les Éditions de Minuit, 1972.
- Entretiens (Interviews), Paris, Scholies/Fata Morgana, 1973.
- Horizons du monde (Horizons of the World, The Unfolding of an Investigation Part 2), Paris, Les Éditions de Minuit, 1974.
- Contribution à la logique (Contribution to Logic, The Unfolding of the Game Part 3), Paris, Les Éditions de Minuit, 1977.
- Problèmes de l'enjeu (Issues at Stake, The Unfolding of an Investigation Part 3), Paris, Les Éditions de Minuit, 1979.
- Systématique ouverte (Open Systems), Paris, Les Éditions de Minuit, 1984.
- Métamorphoses (Metamorphoses), 1991.
- L'errance érotique (Erotic Errance), 1992.
- Lettres à un jeune penseur (Letters to a Young Thinker), Paris, Les Éditions de Minuit, 1996.
- Notices autobiographiques (Autobiography), 1997.
- Ce questionnement (This Questioning), Paris, Les Éditions de Minuit, 2001
- Réponses énigmatiques (Enigmatic Answers), Paris, Les Éditions de Minuit, 2005.
- Ce qui advient. Fragments d'une approche (What Happens. Fragments of an Approach), Paris, Les Belles-Lettres, coll. "Encre marine", 2009.

German bibliography

- Axelos, Kostas. Einführung in ein künftiges Denken: Uber Marx Und Heidegger (Introduction to the Thought of the Future: About Marx and Heidegger). Tübingen: Max Niemeyer, 1966; English translation by Kenneth Mills, edited and introduced by Stuart Elden, Lüneburg: Meson Press, 2015.

English bibliography Full English bibliography with links available at "Progressive Geographies". 23 May 2014.

- Axelos, Kostas. Alienation, Praxis, & Techne in the Thought of Karl Marx. Trans. Ronald Bruzina. Austin: University of Texas Press. 1976.
- Axelos, Kostas. "Planetary Interlude," from Vers la pensée planétaire. Trans. Sally Hess. Yale French Studies. No. 41: Game, Play, Literature: 1968, pg. 6–18.
- Axelos, Kostas. "Marx, Freud and the Undertakings of Thought in the Future." Trans. Sally Bradshaw. Diogenes. Vol. 18, No. 72: 1970, pg. 96–111.
- Axelos, Kostas. "Play as the System of Systems." SubStance. Vol. 8 (4), Issue 25: 1979, pg. 20–24.
- Axelos, Kostas, and Elden, Stuart. "Mondialisation Without the World." Radical Philosophy. No. 130: March/April 2005, pg. 25–28.
- Axelos, Kostas. "The World: Being Becoming Totality." Environment and Planning D: Society and Space. Vol. 24: 2006, pg. 643–651. Chapter from Systématique ouverte, with introduction: Stuart Elden, "Introducing Kostas Axelos and 'The World,'" Environment and Planning D: Society and Space. Vol. 24: 2006, pg. 639–642.

== See also ==
- Becoming (philosophy)

== Sources ==
- Elden, Stuart. "Kostas Axelos and the World of the Arguments Circle." In Bourg, J. (ed.). After the Deluge: New Perspectives on Postwar French Intellectual and Cultural History of Postwar France. Lanham: Lexington Books; 2004: pg. 125-148.
- Memos, Christos. "For Marx and Marxism: An Interview with Kostas Axelos." Thesis Eleven. No. 98: 2009 (August), pg. 129–139.
