= Change the World Without Taking Power =

Book by John Holloway

Change the World Without Taking Power: The Meaning of Revolution Today
- Author: John Holloway
- Language: English
- Publisher: Pluto Press
- Publication date: June 2002
- Publication place: United States
- Media type: Print
- ISBN: 0-7453-1863-0

Change the World Without Taking Power: The Meaning of Revolution Today is a book by John Holloway first published in 2002. It looks at the understanding of power as the central focal point of how to effect meaningful change. Holloway uses two definitions of power, 'power-over' and 'power-to' in order to understand the difference between power from authority, power over someone else, and the power to do something, the capacity for action. Holloway argues we should never simply assume the legitimacy of anything with 'power-over' someone else and goes as far as saying this is true for the state - we should not 'fetishise' the state to the extent of simply assuming its role, responsibilities, and authority.

Holloway criticises past revolutions as they have simply instituted a different form of authority, of 'power-over', and have therefore not been truly revolutionary in changing the structure of power itself. He hopes for a revolution that is more anarchic in nature, dissolving such hierarchy and authority to more genuinely empower people and their capacities to do certain things.

The book has opened up a wave of debate between Holloway and intellectuals on the far-left. Many of these debates were collected by the International Institute for Research and Education in a free booklet.

== See also ==
- ay'tik Musical composition inspired on the book
