= Marshall Berman bibliography =

- Books↙: 6
- Articles↙: 92
- Stories↙: 1
- Letters↙: 9
- Books edited↙: 1
- Introductions↙: 1
- Reviews↙: 43

Marshall Berman was an American professor, author, critic, and essayist. Berman wrote three non-fiction books spanning philosophy, literary theory, urbanism, and history, as well as numerous published essays and reviews.

In 1982, Berman published All That Is Solid Melts into Air, which garnered immediate attention. Berman's work regularly appeared in publications such as The Nation, the Village Voice, Dissent, Partisan Review, and The New York Times Book Review.

== Books ==
Title	Publication Year	ISBN
The Politics of Authenticity	1970	978-1844674404
All That Is Solid Melts into Air	1982	978-0140109627
Adventures in Marxism	1999	978-1859843093
On the Town	2006	978-1400063314
Manhattan Picture Worlds	2009	978-3866782440
Modernism in the Streets (Note: Edited and published posthumously)	2017	978-1784784980

== As editor ==
Title	Publication Year	ISBN
New York Calling: From Blackout to Bloomberg	2007	978-1861893383

== Introductions ==
Title	Publication Year	ISBN
The Communist Manifesto (Penguin Classics Deluxe Edition)	2011	978-0143106265

== Essays and articles ==
- The Truth, The Self and The World: Some Characteristic Problems of Romanticism in King's Crown Essays (1961)
- Theory and Practice in Partisan Review (1964)
- Alienation, Community, Freedom in Dissent (1965)
- The Train of History in Partisan Review (1966)
- Abe and Son "Out on Highway 61" in The Flame (1969)
- Notes Toward a New Society: Rousseau and the New Left in Partisan Review (1971)
- Sympathy for the Devil: Faust, the 1960s, and the Tragedy of Development in American Review (1974), The Sixties (1982), and Dissent (2025)
- Buildings Are Judgment ...or "What Man Can Build" in Ramparts (1975)
- Buildings Are Judgment II in Ramparts (1975)
- Liberal and Totalitarian Therapies in Rousseau: A Response to James M. Glass in Political Theory (1976)
- The People in Capital in Bennington Review (1978)
- "All That Is Solid Melts Into Air": Marx, Modernism, and Modernization in Dissent (1978) and Twenty-Five Years of Dissent (1979)
- Baudelaire: Modernism in the Streets in Partisan Review (1979)
- Herbert Marcuse in The Nation (1979)
- Modernity - Yesterday, Today, and Tomorrow in Berkshire Review (1981)
- Susan Sontag's God That Failed in SoHo Weekly News (1982)
- Feminism, Community, Freedom in Dissent (1983)
- A Struggle to the Death in Which Both Sides Are Right in the Village Voice (1983)
- The Signs in the Street: A Response to Perry Anderson in New Left Review (1984)
- Roots, Ruins, Renewals: City Life After Urbicide in the Village Voice (1984)
- Dancing in the Dark in the Village Voice (1984)
- Taking Back the Night: City Planning Keeps Times Square's Glitz Alive in the Village Voice (1986)
- Take It to the Streets: Conflict and Community in Public Space in Dissent (1986)
- The Place of the Poor in Our Cities in Utne Reader (1987)
- Ruins and Reforms: New York Yesterday and Today in Dissent (1987)
- Among the Ruins in New Internationalist (1987)
- The Experience of Modernity in Design After Modernism: Beyond the Object (1988)
- Why Modernism Still Matters in Tikkun (1989) and Modernity and Identity (1992)
- Taking to the Streets in Boston Review (1989)
- The Volume of Desperation in the Village Voice (1989)
- A Response to Jeffrey C. Isaac in Tikkun (1989)
- Eternal City: Two Thousand Years of Street Smarts in Voice Literary Supplement (1989)
- Can These Ruins Live? in Parkett (1989)
- Where Are the New Moderns? in Architectural Design (1990)
- Modernist Anti-Modernism in New Perspectives Quarterly (1991)
- Bass in Your Face in the Village Voice (1991)
- Roundtable: Nationalism in a World of "Ethnic Cleansing" in Tikkun (1992)
- Architecture as a Universal Language in Places Journal (1992)
- The Twentieth Century: the Halo and the Highway in Modernism/Postmodernism (1992)
- Close to the Edge: Reflections on Rap in Tikkun (1993)
- Children of the Future in Dissent (1993) and Legacy of Dissent (1994)
- Remembering Irving Howe in Dissent (1993)
- Keeping the Gates Open in Tikkun (1993)
- Postmodernism in The Oxford Companion to Politics of the World (1993)
- "Don't Kidnap Me, I'm a Professor": Looking at Brazil in Dissent (1994)
- Signs Square in the Village Voice (1995)
- Modernism and Human Rights Near the Millennium in Dissent (1995)
- In the Forest of Symbols: Some Notes on Modernism in New York in Metropolis: Center and Symbol of Our Times (1995)
- Temas de los tiempos modernos: Marx y el futuro in Quehacer (1996)
- Falling Towers: City Life after Urbicide in Geography and Identity: Living and Exploring Geopolitics of Identity (1996)
- "A Little Child Shall Lead Them": The Jewish Family Romance in The Jew in the Text (1996)
- Picasso Surviving in Dissent (1997) and etcétera (1997)
- Sign of the Times: The Lure of 42nd Street in Dissent (1997)
- Justice/Just Us: Rap and Social Justice in America in The Urbanization of Injustice (1997)
- The Marriage of Heaven and Hell: On the Synthesis of Times Square in Harvard Design Magazine (1998)
- Views from the Burning Bridge in Urban Mythologies: The Bronx Represented Since the 1960s (1999) and Dissent (1999)
- Ten Years After 1989 in Dissent (1999)
- Museums in the Age of Giuliani in Art in America (1999)
- The Lonely Crowd: New York After the War in New York, An Illustrated History (1999)
- Blue Jay Way: Where Will Critical Culture Come From? in Dissent (2000)
- It Happens Every Day in The Pragmatist Imagination (2000)
- The Labor Movement: Is Anybody Home? in Dissent (2001)
- Notes from Underground: Plato's Cave, Piranesi's Prisons, and the Subway in Harvard Design Magazine (2001)
- Women and the Metamorphoses of Times Square in Dissent (2001)
- Dancing with America: Philip Roth, Writer on the Left in New Labor Forum (2001)
- Missing in Action: Death and Life in New York in Lingua Franca (2001)
- Too Much Is Not Enough: Metamorphoses of Times Square in Impossible Presence (2001)
- Love and Theft: From Jack Robin to Bob Dylan in Dissent (2002)
- When Bad Buildings Happen to Good People in After the World Trade Center (2002)
- Marshall Berman Responds in Dissent (2003)
- The City Rises: Rebuilding Meaning After 9/11 in Dissent (2003)
- Standing in the Doorway: Dissent in the 21st Century in Dissent (2004)
- Israel: No Souvenirs in Dissent (2004)
- Marshall Berman Responds in Dissent (2005)
- The Last Page in Dissent (2005)
- A Times Square for the New Millennium: Life on the Cleaned-up Boulevard in Dissent (2006)
- Marx in China: Modern Art, Modern Conflicts, Modern Workers in Dissent (2006)
- Home Fires Burning: Times Square's Signs in DESIGNER/builder (2006)
- New York Calling in Dissent (2007)
- Guys, Dolls, and Deals: Old and New Times Square in The Suburbanization of New York (2007)
- 1968: Lessons Learned in Dissent (2008)
- »Ausghen« in der Stadt: Times Square, Potsdamer Platz und moderne Ubranität in New York - Berlin (2008)
- Here Comes Everybody in The New York 2030 Notebook (2008)
- Gerald Cohen (1941-2009) in openDemocracy (2009)
- Falling in Restless Cities (2010)
- "Mass Merger": Whitman and Baudelaire, the Modern Street, and Democratic Culture in A Political Companion to Walt Whitman (2011)
- In Poland, Followed by Shadows in Dissent (2012)
- The Romance of Public Space in Beyond Zuccotti Park (2012)
- Emerging from the Ruins (Note: Published posthumously) in Dissent (2014) and Adventures in Modernism (2016)
- New York City: Seeing Through the Ruins in Nonstop Metropolis (2016)

== Letters ==
- Subject Slip-Up in The Harvard Crimson (1966)
- Something Beautiful in The Village Voice (1967)
- The Divided Self - Mr. Berman replies in The New York Times Book Review (1970)
- Erik H. Erikson - Marshall Berman replies in The New York Times Book Review (1975)
- The Authentic Rousseau in American Political Science Review (1975)
- Lower East 'Sides' - Marshall Berman replies in the Village Voice (1983)
- Hope for Labor in The New York Review of Books (1996)
- Repression in Cuba in The New York Review of Books (2003)
- The US and the Plight of the Iranians in The New York Review of Books (2007)

== Short stories ==
- Weathering Heights in Dynamo (1957)

== Reviews ==
Year	Title	Publication	Subject
1959	Politics and Ideology On the American Right	Columbia Daily Spectator	Up from Liberalism, William F. Buckley, Jr. (1959)
1960	Interpreting and Changing: And No Perspective	Columbia Daily Spectator	European Socialism, Carl Landauer (1959)
1961	Sex, Love and the Individual	Columbia Daily Spectator	Wilhelm Reich: Selected Writings, an Introduction to Orgonomy (1960)
1966	"The Lower East Side: Portal to American Life, 1870-1924"	Mosaic	The Lower East Side: Portal to American Life, 1870-1924, the Jewish Museum (1966)
1970	Must Man Go Mad in Order to Be Sane?	The New York Times Book Review	The Divided Self and The Self and Others, R.D. Laing
1972	Weird But Brilliant Light on the Way We Live Now	The New York Times Book Review	Relations in Public, Erving Goffman (1971) ISBN 978-0465068951
1972	A New Edition of a Great Work of Historical Imagination	The New York Times Book Review	To the Finland Station, Edmund Wilson (1972) ISBN 978-0374278335
1973	That Is the Land of Lost Content, I See It Shining Plain	The New York Times Book Review	The Country and the City, Raymond Williams (1973) ISBN 978-0195197365
1974	Everybody Who's Nobody and the Nobody Who's Everybody	The New York Times Book Review	Working, Studs Terkel (1974) ISBN 978-0394478845
1975	Erik Erikson: The Man Who Invented Himself	The New York Times Book Review	Life History and the Historical Moment, Erik H. Erikson (1975) ISBN 978-0393011036
1977	Facades at Face Value	The Nation	The Fall of Public Man, Richard Sennett (1977) ISBN 978-0394487151
1978	Family Affairs	The New York Times Book Review	Haven in a Heartless World, Christopher Lasch (1978) ISBN 978-0465028832
1979	Marx: The Dancer and the Dance	The Nation	Marx's Fate, Jerrold Seigel (1978) ISBN 978-0691052595
1980	From Paris to Gdansk	The New York Times Book Review	Fire in the Minds of Men, James H. Billington (1980) ISBN 978-0465024056
1982	Misanthrope's Advice	The New York Times Book Review	The Eighth Night of Creation, Jerome Deshusses (1982) ISBN 978-0888790804
1983	Harvey Pekar, Underground Man	Voice Literary Supplement	American Splendor, Harvey Pekar
1984	"The Bourgois Experience, Victoria to Freud: Volume 1, Education of the Senses"	Vanity Fair	The Bourgeois Experience, Peter Gay (1984) ISBN 978-0195033526
1985	Georg Lukács's Cosmic Chutzpah	Voice Literary Supplement	Record of a Life: An Autobiographical Sketch, György Lukács (1983) ISBN 978-0860910718
1985	La Cité, C'est Moi	The Nation	I, Koch, Arthur Browne, Dan Collins, Michael Goodwin (1984) ISBN 978-0396086475
1986	Scenes from a Marriage	The Village Voice	Knocked Out Loaded, Bob Dylan (1986)
1986	Blowin' Away the Lies	The Village Voice	Live 1975–85, Bruce Springsteen (1986)
1988	Humanism and Terror	The Nation	Zion and State, Mitchell Cohen (1987) ISBN 978-0631152439 and The Yellow Wind, David Grossman (1988) ISBN 978-0224025669
1991	L.A. Raw	The Nation	City of Quartz, Mike Davis (1990) ISBN 978-0860913030
1991	After the Gold Rush: A Nostalgic Retrospect of the Sixties	Dissent	Berkeley in the Sixties (1990)
1992	Hitting the Streets	Los Angeles Times Book Review	Variations on a Theme Park, Michael Sorkin (1990) ISBN 978-0374523145
1992	A View From The Bridge	Culturefront	Bridges and Boundaries: African Americans and American Jews, the Jewish Museum (1992)
1995	Waiting for the Barbarians	The Nation	1920 Diary, Isaac Babel (1990) ISBN 978-0300059663
1995	Kafka Family Values	The Nation	Franz Kafka, the Jewish Patient, Sander Gilman (1995) ISBN 978-0415911771
1996	In the Night Kitchen	The Nation	A Lifetime Burning in Every Moment: From the Journals of Alfred Kazin, Alfred Kazin (1996) ISBN 978-0060190378
1996	The Bonds of Love	The Nation	From Bondage, Henry Roth (1996) ISBN 978-0297818458
1996	Meyer Schapiro: The Presence of the Subject	New Politics	Theory and Philosophy of Art: Style, Artist, and Society, Meyer Schapiro (1994) ISBN 978-0807613566
1997	Angel in the City	The Nation	Walter Benjamin: A Biography, Momme Brodersen (1996) ISBN 978-1859849675, Walter Benjamin, Selected Writings. Volume I: 1913-1926, Walter Benjamin (1996) ISBN 978-0674945852, and Benjamin's Crossing, Jay Parini (1997) ISBN 978-0805031805
1998	Unchained Melody	The Nation	The Communist Manifesto: A Modern Edition, Karl Marx and Friedrich Engels (1998) ISBN 978-1859848982
1998	The Last Page	Dissent	Underworld, Don DeLillo (1997) ISBN 978-0684842691
2000	Lost in the Arcades	Metropolis	The Arcades Project, Walter Benjamin (1999) ISBN 978-0674043268
2000	Crossing Swords: Trees Growing in Brooklyn	Dissent	Crossing Swords (magazine)
2002	Dancing in the Dark	Dissent	Left in the Dark: Film Reviews and Essays 1988-2001, Stuart Klawans (2001) ISBN 978-1560253655
2006	"Moment of Grace: The American City in the 1950s"	Harvard Design Magazine	Moment of Grace: The American City in the 1950s, Michael Johns (2003) ISBN 978-0520234352
2006	Tradition... Transgression!: Singer in the Shtetl and on the Street	Moderna Språk	Collected Stories, Isaac Bashevis Singer (2004) ISBN 978-1598534559
2007	Bringing Back Moses	The Architect's Newspaper	Robert Moses and the Modern City: The Transformation of New York, Hilary Ballon and Kenneth T. Jackson eds. (2007) ISBN 978-0393732061
2008	Review: Modernism	Columbia Magazine	Modernism: The Lure of Heresy, Peter Gay (2007) ISBN 978-0393052053
2008	Modernism in the Streets	Dissent	Modernism: The Lure of Heresy, Peter Gay (2007) ISBN 978-0393052053
2009	Orhan Pamuk and Modernist Liberalism	Dissent	Snow, Orhan Pamuk (2005) ISBN 978-0375706868
