= All That Is Solid Melts into Air =

1982 philosophy book by Marshall Berman

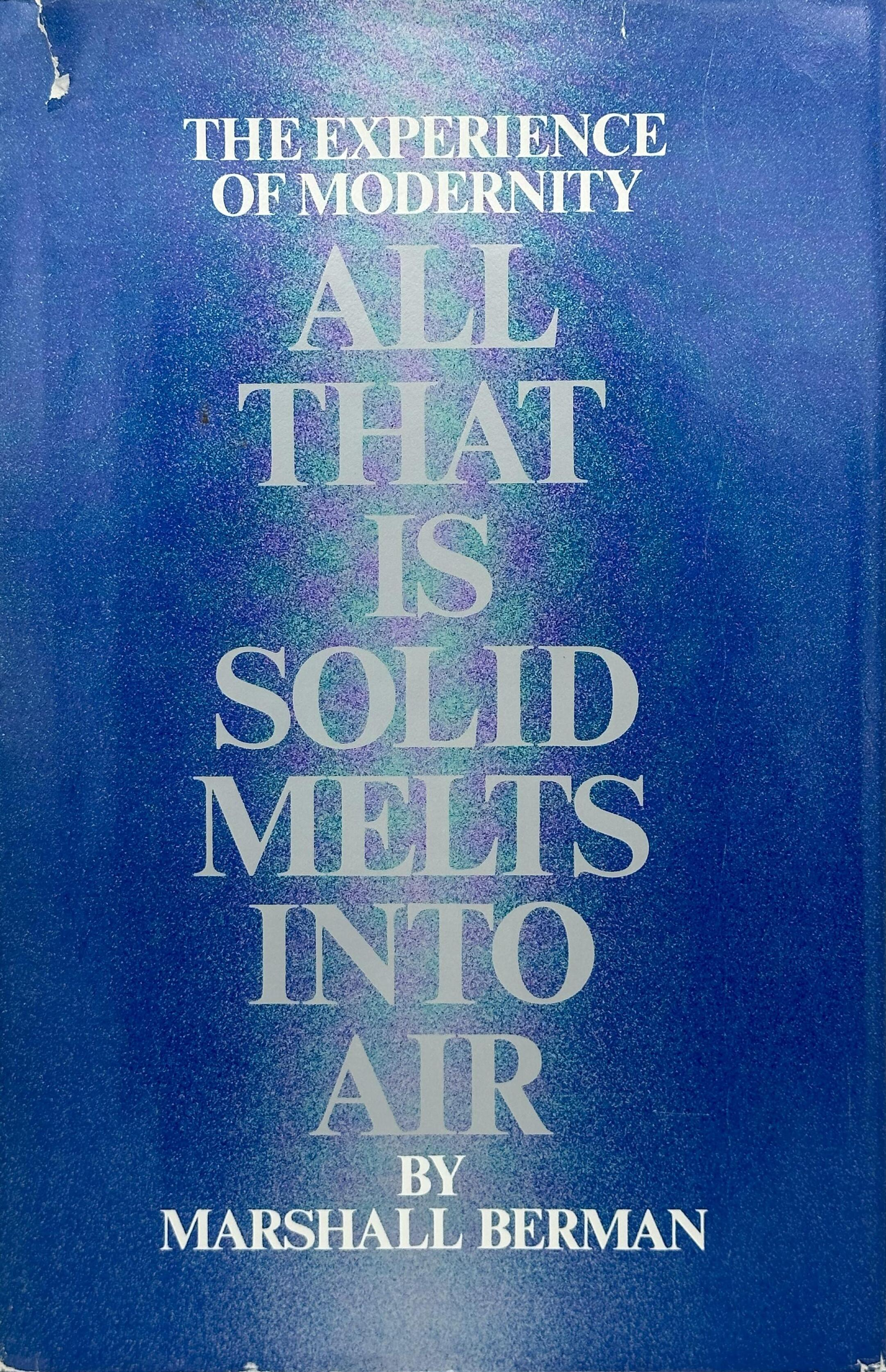
- First edition cover
- Author: Marshall Berman
- Language: English
- Publication date: 1982
- Publication place: United States
- ISBN: 978-0-86091-785-4

All That Is Solid Melts Into Air: The Experience of Modernity is a book by Marshall Berman written between 1971 and 1981, and published in New York City in 1982. The book examines social and economic modernization and its conflicting relationship with modernism. The title of the book is taken from Samuel Moore's 1888 translation of The Communist Manifesto by Karl Marx and Friedrich Engels. (Note: The original German is: “Alles Ständische und Stehende verdampft”. Sperber translates this more closely as: ‘Everything that firmly exists and all the elements of the society of orders evaporate’. (Sperber, J. (2013). Karl Marx: A Nineteenth-Century Life. USA: Liveright.))

Berman uses Johann Wolfgang von Goethe's Faust as a literary interpretation of modernization, through the processes of dreaming, loving and developing. In the second section he uses Marxist texts to analyze the self-destructive nature of modernization. In the third section French poetry (especially Charles Baudelaire) is used as model of modernist writing, followed by a selection of Russian literature (Alexander Pushkin, Fyodor Dostoevsky, Andrei Bely, Nikolai Gogol and Osip Mandelstam) in the fourth section. The book concludes with some notes on modernism in New York City during the 1960s and 1970s. New York City's subway map is said to have been designed in accordance with Berman's vision of modernity, presented in the book. Berman recalls: "It was a thrill when the man who had designed New York's marvelous Subway Map came up to me on Broadway, and said that all the time he was putting his map together, he had tried to keep my book in mind."

== Part I. Goethe's Faust: The Tragedy of Development ==
Marshall Berman begins this book by making a literary comparison between Goethe's Faust and the process and mode of Modernity claiming that "the whole movement of the work enacts the larger movement of Western society". In Berman's view, the three 'metamorphoses' which Faust passes through (the Dreamer, the Lover, and the Developer) express the journey of Modernity.

By starting "in an intellectual's lonely room, in an abstracted and isolated realm of thought; it ends in the midst of a far reaching realm of production and exchange, ruled by giant corporate bodies and complex organizations, which Faust's thought it helping to create, and which are enabling him to create more."

The main focus that Berman wishes us to glean from this Part I (which will set the tone for the rest of the book), is that Faust is the epitome of Modernity in that he is like a "sorcerer who is no longer able to control the powers of the underworld that he has called up by his spells."

=== First Metamorphosis: The Dreamer ===
In the first metamorphosis, Marshall compares Faust to being in the phase of the Dreamer. Here, Faust is a successful and intellectually gifted man detached from the world. An esteemed doctor, lawyer, theologian, philosopher, scientist, professor and college administrator, Faust is an accomplished person. Yet he feels that all his successes have been hollow, and he talks endlessly about how he hasn't lived at all.

"What makes Faust’s triumphs feel like traps to him is that up to now they have all been triumphs of inwardness. For years, through both meditation and experimentation, through reading books and taking drugs—he is a humanist in the truest sense; nothing human is alien to him—he has done all he could do to cultivate his capacity for thought and feeling and vision. And yet the further his mind has expanded, the deeper his sensitivity has grown, the more he has isolated himself, and the more impoverished have become his relationships to life outside—to other people, to nature, even to his own needs and active powers. His culture has developed by detaching itself from the totality of life."

Faust here represents the Modern Humanist who is trying to break away from the stagnant traditions of the feudal society he comes from. "As the bearer of a dynamic culture within a stagnant society, he is torn between inner and outer life."

The pain is so great that Faust nearly kills himself in this dark night of the soul, but is saved by a sort of deus ex machina where light, bells and god come from nowhere and save him. He leaves his house and joins a parade in the street where he is guided back to his old neighborhood. The old neighborhood here represents the old feudal world where he worked as an "patchwork doctor practising traditional medieval small craft medicine" with his father with whom he is sure he killed more lives than he saved. Faust in fact first began his solitary intellectual endeavors, leaving behind this old life due to the grievance of this past. Faust is now with a situation in which he realizes that he knows he cannot fall back on the claustral comforts of his childhood home—though he also knows he can’t let himself drift as far from home as he has been for all these years. He needs to make a connection between the solidity and warmth of life with people—everyday life lived within the matrix of a concrete community—and the intellectual and cultural revolution that has taken place in his head."

At this point, Mephistopheles (the symbol of the devil) and the notion of the Faustian Bargain materializes. Mephisto lets Faust know that in order to attain his cravings and desires, to find the developments of his mind in the world, we will have to work with the power of destruction. As Marshall Berman says, "In order to bring about the synthesis he craves, Faust will have to embrace a whole new order of paradoxes, paradoxes that are crucial to the structure of both the modern psyche and the modern economy. [...] Only if Faust works with and through these destructive powers will he be able to create anything in the world: in fact, it is only by working with the devil, and willing “nothing but evil,” that he can end up on God’s side and “create the good.”

=== Second Metamorphosis: The Lover ===
The second metamorphosis focuses on the relationship of love and separation between the new becoming world of the Faustian Bargain, and the old dying world of stagnancy. Marshall Berman here argues that Faust's passionate love and tragedy with Gretchen "will dramatize the tragic impact - at once explosive and implosive - of modern desires and sensibilities on a traditional world."

Describing the context of this metamorphosis, Marshall writes, "We began with Faust intellectually detached from the traditional world he grew up in, but physically still in its grip. Then, through the mediation of Mephisto and his money, he was able to become physically as well as spiritually free. Now he is clearly disengaged from “the little world”; he can return to it as a stranger, survey it as a whole from his emancipated perspective—and, ironically, fall in love with it. Gretchen—the young girl who becomes Faust’s first lay, then his first love, finally his first casualty—strikes him first of all as a symbol of everything most beautiful in the world he has left and lost. He is enthralled with her childlike innocence, her small-town simplicity, her Christian humility."

Faust falls in love with Gretchen, the symbol of the traditional world and Gretchen is strongly affected seeking to change in order to find a place in Faust's life, in the modern world - "she is forced to develop a new sense of herself in a hurry". As she grows and develops she becomes more and more deeply in love with Faust to the point that Faust cannot bear it and he takes off in escape, returning to nature to sit in meditation and write poetry. Yet, here Mephisto comes and tortures the calm balance of Faust's life 'delivering a caustic critique' claiming that if Faust wants true nature, "he had better confront the human consequences of his own emerging nature."

In the meantime, Gretchen's traditional world community has found out about her changing faith and turns on her with "cruelty and vindictive fury." When she turns to the church to be saved, she only receives 'the day of wrath, that day shall dissolve the world in fire'. Marshall Berman makes the insight here that, "Once, perhaps, the Gothic vision might have offered mankind an ideal of life and activity, of heroic striving toward heaven; now, however, as Goethe presents it at the end of the eighteenth century, all it has to offer is dead weight pressing down on its subjects, crushing their bodies and strangling their souls."

The end comes fast and tragedy strikes Gretchen placing her in a cell to be executed (her baby had died and she was blamed as a murderess). Faust tries to save her from the prison but she simply refuses, her Christian tradition and visions of her mother barring her way to escape.

Here Marshall invokes the Communist Manifesto (a big influence on his work as per the title of the entire book) and its first goal of, "put an end to all feudal, patriarchal, idyllic conditions," as being the symbol of this Metamorphosis. Here Marshall writes, "The first part of Faust takes place at a moment when, after centuries, these feudal, patriarchal social conditions are breaking down. The vast majority of people still live in “little worlds” like Gretchen’s, and those worlds, as we have seen, are formidable enough. Nevertheless, these cellular small towns are beginning to crack: first of all, through contact with explosive marginal figures from outside—Faust and Mephisto, bursting with money, sexuality and ideas, are the classical “outside agitators”.

=== Third Metamorphosis: The Developer ===
In synoptic overview, Marshall Berman tells us, "In his first phase, as we saw, he lived alone and dreamed. In his second period, he intertwined his life with the life of another person, and learned to love. Now, in his last incarnation, he connects his personal drives with the economic, political and social forces that drive the world; he learns to build and to destroy. He expands the horizon of his being from private to public life, from intimacy to activism, from communion to organization. He pits all his powers against nature and society; he strives to change not only his own life but everyone else’s as well. Now he finds a way to act effectively against the feudal and patriarchal world: to construct a radically new social environment that will empty the old world out or break it down."

This metamorphosis begins with a scene in which Faust is inspired to make man more powerful than the elements. Looking over the sea Faust is outraged claiming, "Why should men let things go on being the way they have always been? Isn't it about time for mankind to assert itself against nature's tyrannical arrogance, to confront natural forces in the name of "the free spirit that protects all rights"?

Faust now has a vision to transform the entire landscape around him into a great series of projects and developments to harness nature and turn civilization into the master of nature. Marshall writes, "We suddenly find ourselves at a nodal point in the history of modern self-awareness. We are witnessing the birth of a new social division of labor, a new vocation, a new relationship between ideas and practical life. Two radically different historical movements are converging and beginning to flow together. A great spiritual and cultural ideal is merging into an emerging material and social reality."

In order for Faust to do his work of development, he must align himself with the powers that be (for access to land and capital) - these powers being the remains of the Medieval Kingdoms ruled by an emperor or a "gang of pseudo-revolutionaries" backed by the church. He chooses to align himself with the Emperor. "Its main function is to give Faust and Mephisto an easy rationale for the political bargain they make: they lend their minds and their magic to the Emperor, to help him make his power newly solid and efficient. He, in exchange, will give them unlimited rights to develop the whole coastal region, including carte blanche to exploit whatever workers they need and displace whatever indigenous people are in their way."

In what follows Faust and Mephisto clear land and develop the world by guiding an industrial labor force. Many die, land is destroyed, and the indigenous people removed, but at the end, Faust finds himself standing on an artificial hill, "He knows he has made people suffer (“Human sacrifices bled, / Tortured screams would pierce the night. .-.”). But he is convinced that it is the common people, the mass of workers and sufferers, who will benefit most from his great works. In a sense, for Goethe, Faust 'The Developer' is the hero of the tragedy of Modernity. And as the book comes to a close there is a final drama which tragedizes Goethe's work of art.

After having finished his great work of development and creating a new world for all the people from the Gothic small-towns of the old world to find themselves in Modernity, Faust becomes obsessed with a small property of undeveloped land residing in his territory. An old couple on a small piece of land who help all in need must be removed to build an Observation Tower "which can gaze out into the infinite". Faust offers them a sum of money to resettle but they refuse. Now, Faust commits his first truly evil act. He commands a group of men guided by Mephisto to remove them by whatever costs. He doesn't want to know the details, he just wants it done. It is done overnight, and yet Faust becomes curious as to what happens and Mephisto tells him that they were killed.

He is outraged by this as, after all, he never asked for them to be killed! He sends Mephisto away and admonishes what happened. But he can not let it go, guilt consumes him. Marshall reads this episode as representing the Developers gross and evil need to destroy all that is in sight of the new world of the old world. "He comes to feel that it is terrifying to look back, to look the old world in the face." Standing over a balcony viewing the smoldering ruins of the old couple's property, 4 spirits suddenly come to him. Faust sends them all away except for the one called care. Marshall reads into this that the spirits coming to him in this entirely modern moment represents that "he is still beset by witchcraft, magic, ghosts in the night." Here Marshall Berman is insinuating that through care for the worlds old and new, the vanquished magic of the past still lives with him. Before the spirit care leaves him, he learns that his final evil act occurred because this whole time he has been guided by an inner darkness and ignorance.

=== Epilogue: The Faustian and Pseudo-Faustian Age ===
Here, Marshall Berman gives us his final critical insights into the overarching meaning of this exegesis of Goethe's Faust.

==== Faustian Model of Development ====
Marshall Berman states that Goethe creates the essential values of Faust (development, benevolence, future thinking, large projects, social welfare) in order to synthesize a Faustian Model of Development. "

This model gives top priority to gigantic energy and transportation projects on an international scale. It aims less for immediate profits than for long-range development of productive forces, which it believes will produce the best results for everyone in the end. Instead of letting entrepreneurs and workers waste themselves in piecemeal and fragmentary and competitive activities, it will strive to integrate them all. It will create a historically new synthesis of private and public power, symbolized by the union of Mephistopheles, the private freebooter and predator who executes much of the dirty work, and Faust, the public planner who conceives and directs the work as a whole. It will open up an exciting and ambiguous world-historical role for the modern intellectual—Saint-Simon called this figure “the organizer”; I have favored “the developer ” who can bring material, technical and spiritual resources together, and transform them into new structures of social life. Finally, the Faustian model will present a new mode of authority, authority that derives from the leader’s capacity to satisfy modern people’s persistent need for adventurous, open-ended, ever-renewed development.

For Berman this is epitomized in the utopian ideals of the Saint-Simonians and their vision for industry and science to take over the mantle of power from church and state. Berman claims that it was only though in the 20th century that the Faustian Model properly crystallized in the form of "superagencies designed to organize immense construction projects, especially in transportation and energy: canals and railroads, bridges and highways, dams and irrigation systems, hydroelectric power plants, nuclear reactors, new towns and cities, the exploration of outer space."

Berman further makes the point that this Faustian Model is shared by both Capitalist and Socialist, Developing and Developed models of development, underpinning them in a sense.

==== Pseudo-Faustianism ====
Marshall Berman claims that while the true Faustian man is selfless and benevolent, there are many projects which may seem Faustian which are in fact "theaters of cruelty and absurdity". To cite some examples he brings up: (i) Stalin's White Sea Canal (ii) Failures of Soviet Collectivization (iii) Shah of Tehran (iv) Peking.

His main point here is that "many contemporary ruling classes, right-wing colonels and left-wing commissars alike, have shown a fatal weakness (more fatal to their subjects, alas, than to themselves) for grandiose projects and campaigns that incarnate all Faust’s gigantism and ruthlessness without any of his scientific and technical ability, organizational genius or political sensitivity to people’s real desires and needs. Millions of people have been victimized by disastrous development policies, megalomaniacally conceived, shoddily and insensitively executed, which in the end have developed little but the rulers’ own fortunes and powers."

==== Faustian Man ====
Faustian man is inherently historical. He believes that the world around him can and must be bettered and that it is his place to bring this progress at a massive scale. For Berman, the Civil Rights and Anti-War Movements of the 1960s and on have all been Faustian. He further makes the astute point that many plans of anti-modernization, degrowth and social transformation in the wake of modernization are Faustian in themselves in that they see their historical moment in history and which to make radical progress.

==== The Faustian Man of Modernity Is No Capitalist ====
An interpretation of the same text (Goethe's Faust) by Gyorgy Lukacs stated that the last act of Faust is a tragedy of capitalist development in its early industrial phase. Berman strongly disagrees stating that while Mephistopheles conforms well to the capitalist entrepreneur, Goethe's Faust is "worlds away" with "the deepest horrors of Faustian development spring from its most honorable aims and its most authentic achievements. If we want to locate Faustian visions and designs in the aged Goethe’s time, the place to look is not in the economic and social realities of that age but in its radical and Utopian dreams; and, moreover, not in the capitalism of that age, but in its socialism.".

Berman's main point here which he explicates is that both Goethe and Faust were interested in making long-term solutions to problems effecting the public. Personal interest was not at the center, and in this way, Berman draws the analysis that Goethe was strongly influenced by the visionary benevolence of Saint-Simonians and the "young writers of Le Globe" of the 1820s.

== Part II. All That Is Solid Melts Into Air: Marx, Modernism and Modernization ==
In Part II, Marshall Berman tells us that he will reveal to us the way in which "the modern spiritual quest reaches its fulfillment". He will do this by showing us how Karl Marx's work echoed and reflected the sense of wholeness which Goethe's Faust depicted of Modernity. The reason he believes it is necessary to show us the inherent wholeness of Modernity through Marx's work is because Berman believes a dualistic view of Modernity has prevailed in which "Current thinking has broken into two different compartments, hermetically sealed off from one another: "modernization" in economics and politics, "modernism" in art, culture and sensibility. Berman believes it is Karl Marx's work which most comprehensively captures the whole rather than the duality, claiming, "Specifically, he can clarify the relationship between modernist culture and the bourgeois economy and society - the world of "modernization"-from which it [modernism] has sprung. We will see that they have far more in common than either modernists or bourgeoisie would like to think".

=== 1. The Melting Vision and Its Dialectic ===
In this section Marshall Berman assesses that the Communist Manifesto while at once prophesizing the end of the bourgeois rule is at the same time rejoicing the developments of the bourgeois revolution and the age of Modernity. Berman in fact claims that "he [Karl Marx] hopes to heal the wounds of modernity through a fuller and deeper modernity".

The main point of this section is to demonstrate that the bourgeois rule, and the capitalist relations of production have pushed society into "a process of continual, restless, open-ended, unbounded growth". The Communist Manifesto apparently claims this to be the case due to the two great bourgeois achievements: (i) "They have proved it possible, through organized and concerted action, to really change the world" (ii) "the second great bourgeois achievement has been to liberate the human capacity and drive for development: for permanent change, for perpetual upheaval and renewal in every mode of personal and social life."

This continuous drive to cause change, upheaval and impermanence by the Bourgeois elites is a part of the mechanics of Modernity.

=== 2. Innovative Self-Destruction ===
In this section, Marshall Berman brings into question the possibility of there ever existing a permanent Communist Party. Berman makes the analysis that Marx is proposing that, "The worker's communal bonds, generated inadvertently by capitalist production, will generate militant political institutions, unions that will oppose and finally overthrow the private, atomistic framework of capitalist social relations."

Berman then questions this, stating the obvious paradox of Marx's assumptions, saying, "Thus, simply by reading the Manifesto closely and taking its vision of modernity seriously, we arrive at serious questions about Marx's answers." The problem is that if Modernity and the ruling Bourgeois have created an environment of constant change where things become obsolete before they can ossify, then how will a permanent Communist Society ever exist?

=== 3. Nakedness: The Unaccommodated Man ===
In the Communist Manifesto, Berman states that Marx believed that Modernity itself and the Bourgeois revolution will reveal the cold truth of reality and leave men naked. While Marx has somewhat rosy visions of the great emancipation that will occur when the proletariat understand what it means to be cold and naked in the storm of the world, Berman questions this affirming that there are many other pathways Modernity might take, citing the pessimism of British Conservativism via Burke, and also the positivity of the "philosophes" via Rousseau and Montesquieu.

But what Berman believes more deeply is invoked by Marx is Shakespeare's King Lear, specifically when he is thrown out into the tempest and strips himself naked embracing his true, cold and carnal animal self. It is in this state of primitive weakness that "they [the proletariat] will come together to overcome the cold that cuts through them all."

Berman finishes this section in a sort of deflated way, stating that it's most likely that humanity within Modernity will not have a clear view of its nature, similar to prior epochs.

=== 4. The Metamorphosis of Values ===
In this section, Berman makes the point that in Modernity via Capitalism all values in the world, all social structures, and ways of being get subsumed into the global market. "Old modes of honor and dignity do not die; instead, they get incorporated into the market, take on price tags, gain a new life as commodities. Thus, any imaginable mode of human conduct becomes morally permissible the moment it becomes economically possible, becomes valuable; anything goes if it pays."

There is an opportunity here and a pitfall. On the one hand, with a world that has been made flat and equal by the reduction of values to capital, ideas critical and antithetical to Capitalism may be proliferated with no question. This is due to the fact that in order to maintain an open and global economy society must maintain a liberal attitude to all ideas, foreign and benign.

On the other hand, as a pitfall, in order for intellectuals, ideologues and communists to get by peddling their "wares" of intellectual labor, their wares must generate capital for themselves and those who pay them. This as it were, keeps us in a loop that cannot quite be escaped by "selling the revolution of communism".

=== 5. The Loss of a Halo ===
When all of the traditional world's values were forced into the Capitalist system, all halos were removed. Berman interprets Halo here as a primary symbol of religious experience, the experience of something holy. "The halo splits life into sacred and profane: it creates an aura of holy dread and radiance around the figure who wears it; the sanctified figure is torn from the matrix of the human condition, split off inexorably from the needs and pressures that animate the men and women who surround it."

Berman analyzes this quote from Marx, "The bourgeoisie has stripped of its halo every activity hitherto honored and looked up to with reverent awe. It has transformed the doctor, the lawyer, the priest, the poet, the man of science, into its paid wage-laborers." Berman believes that Marx makes this statement critiquing practically all professionals and intellectuals making them know that they are simple wage-earners, "anyone who wants to create must work in the orbit of its power. [...] They must scheme and hustle to present themselves in a maximally profitable light; they must compete (often brutally and unscrupulously) for the privilege of being bought, simply in order to go on with their work."

Berman reiterates here that modern intellectuals who are ideologues for "the revolution" will continue to imagine radical ways to stimulate paying bidders. In a certain sense in fact, Berman finds that radicalization and revolution will in fact further stimulate capitalism and more deeply indebt us to Modernity.

=== Conclusion: Culture and the Contradictions of Capitalism ===
Berman here brings up a series of points to summarize this section on Marx and Modernity. The first is that he believes Modernism must become more Marxist and that Marxism must become more Modernist. That is to say on the first account that to miss Marx's poetic quality is not to understand Marxism in its entirety. On the second account, this is to say that Modernist art, or art that considers itself pure art separate from the Capitalist world must begin to integrate the Marxist worldview and the way in which Modernism is produced by its Capitalist underpinning.

His concluding remarks are as follows:

"He [Karl Marx] knew we must start where we are: psychically naked, stripped of all religious, aesthetic, moral haloes and sentimental veils, thrown back on our individual will and energy, forced to expoit each other and ourselves in order to survive; and yet, in spite of all, thrown together by the same forces that pull us apart, dimly aware of all we might be together, ready to stretch ourselves to grasp new human possibilities, to develop identities and mutual bonds that can help us hold together as the fierce modern air blows hot and cold through us all."

== Part III. Baudelaire: Modernism in the Streets ==
In Part III, Berman analyzes what Modernity is through the prose, poetry, and prose-poetry of Baudelaire who he claims represents the first Modernist.

=== 1: Pastoral and Counter-Pastoral Modernism ===
In this essay, Berman details the way in which Baudelaire both rejoiced in and rejected Modernity and its culture. He cites works such as "To The Bourgeois" as being pastoral in that it romanticized the impending Modern age, and he cites others as counter-pastoral in that it denigrates Modern culture.

=== 2: The Heroism of Modern Life ===
In this essay, Berman shows the ways in which Baudelaire made conscious the zeitgeist of Modern times. The way in which he used revolutionary prose-poetry in order to express the transformation which modern men needed to make in order to come to life in the modern age.

One of these notions, similar to James Joyce's notion of Ulysses, is that the heroes of the modern age are not the heroes of the past, but, rather, are normal people like the banker, the proletariat, the politician and the street vendors.

=== 3: The Family of Eyes ===
Here, Berman analyzes a poem by Baudelaire called, "The Eyes of the Poor". He uses it and its contextualization to discuss the modernization happening around Baudelaire which he is reflecting in his Modernism. Berman notes the effects of "the Napoleon-Haussmann boulevards", a project of urban (re)development which radically altered social relations via material.

=== 4: The Mire of the Macadam ===
The next modern scene is found in the prose poem 'Loss of a Halo'. Here, Berman is drawing a parallel between Marx and Baudelaire noting their communal use of the "Loss of a Halo". The purpose here is to further display the way in which modern humanity is stripped of its values, honor and nobility in exchange for reduction to nihilistic, primitive nakedness of morality and virtue. Once again, Berman reiterates that the Heroism of Modern Life for Baudelaire is found in the primal scene of the street.

=== The Twentieth Century: The Halo and the Highway ===
Berman uses his final essay/section here, not to summarize Baudelaire and Modernism, but rather to address the ascendance of a new Halo which has descended upon the head of a new Modernism. He speaks specifically of the trends of 19th and 20th century urban planning and highway building to create separation between man and machine. He cites Le Corbusier as having planted the seed of this Modernism which was antithetical to the multitude's creation of Modernity and to the projects of Napoleon and Haussmann. This new Modernism which wanted to remove all human chaos from the efficiency of the highway would guide urban planning down the very path which Jane Jacobs fought against.

== Part IV. Petersburg: The Modernism of Underdevelopment ==
This essay depicts the spirit of modernity and the process of modernization through the lens of experience in St. Petersburg. Berman states that historically, St. Petersburg has been a cosmopolitan center for Russia, and Moscow has represented Russian orthodoxy, tradition and lineage.

=== 1. The Real and Unreal City ===
"The building of St. Petersburg is probably the most dramatic instance in world history of modernization conceived and imposed draconically from above." In this section, Berman analyses the history of Czarist influences on St. Petersburg and the management of political-economy. He also existentially expresses the city's spirit through the analysis of the writings of Pushkin, Gogol and Dostoevsky.

=== 2. The 1860s: The New Man in the Street ===
In this essay, Berman assesses the dream of Modernity as having been different and difficult in Russia. He notes that in the 1860s, when men were becoming "equal", that men still had to fight to be equal. He cites Dostoevksy's work especially to make the point that the 'Underground Man' had to fight for his place above ground.

== See also ==
- Modernity
- Modernization
- Modernism
- Marxism
- Postmarxism
- Structuralism
- Anti-modernization
- Postmodernism
