= Modernity =

Historical period and socio-cultural norm or attitude

Modernity, a topic in the humanities and social sciences, is both a historical period (the modern era) and the ensemble of particular socio-cultural norms, attitudes, and practices that arose in the wake of the Renaissance—in the Age of Reason of 17th-century thought and the 18th-century Enlightenment. Commentators variously consider the era of modernity to have ended by 1930, with World War II in 1945, or as late as the period falling between the 1980s and 1990s; the following era is often referred to as "postmodernity". The term "contemporary history" is also used to refer to the post-1945 timeframe, without assigning it to either the modern or postmodern era. (Thus "modern" may be used as a name of a particular era in the past, as opposed to meaning "the current era".)

Depending on the field, modernity may refer to different time periods or qualities. In historiography, the 16th to 18th centuries are usually described as early modern, while the long 19th century corresponds to modern history proper. While it includes a wide range of interrelated historical processes and cultural phenomena (from fashion to modern warfare), it can also refer to the subjective or existential experience of the conditions they produce, and their ongoing impact on human culture, institutions, and politics.

As an analytical concept and normative idea, modernity is closely linked to the ethos of philosophical and aesthetic modernism. These political and intellectual currents that intersect with the Enlightenment and subsequent developments, including existentialism, modern art, the formal establishment of social science, and contemporaneous antithetical developments such as Marxism. Additionally, it encompasses the social relations associated with the rise of capitalism, as well as shifts in attitudes associated with secularization, liberalization, modernization, and post-industrial life.

By the late 19th and early 20th centuries, modernist art, politics, science and culture had come to dominate not only Western Europe and North America, but almost every populated area on the globe, including movements opposing the West or opposing globalization. The modern era is closely associated with the development of individualism, capitalism, urbanization and progressivism—that is, the belief in the possibilities of technological and political progress. Perceptions of problems arising from modernization, which can include the advent of world wars, the reduced role of religion in some societies, or the erosion of traditional cultural norms, have also led to anti-modernization movements. Optimism and the belief in consistent progress (also referred to as whig history) have been subject to criticism in postmodern thought, while the global hegemonic dominance (particularly in the form of imperialism and colonialism) of various powers in western Europe and Anglo-America for most of the period has been criticized in postcolonial theory.

In the context of art history, modernity (Fr. modernité) has a more limited sense, modern art covering the period of c. 1860–1970. Use of the term in this sense is attributed to Charles Baudelaire, who in his 1863 essay "The Painter of Modern Life", designated the "fleeting, ephemeral experience of life in an urban metropolis", and the responsibility art has to capture that experience. In this sense, the term refers to "a particular relationship to time, one characterized by intense historical discontinuity or rupture, openness to the novelty of the future, and a heightened sensitivity to what is unique about the present".

== Etymology ==
The Late Latin adjective modernus, a derivation from the adverb modo ("presently, just now", also "method"), is attested from the 5th century CE, at first in the context of distinguishing the Christian era of the Later Roman Empire from the Pagan era of the Greco-Roman world. In the 6th century CE, Roman historian and statesman Cassiodorus appears to have been the first writer to use modernus ("modern") regularly to refer to his own age.

The terms antiquus and modernus were used in a chronological sense in the Carolingian era. For example, a magister modernus referred to a contemporary scholar, as opposed to old authorities such as Benedict of Nursia. In its early medieval usage, the term modernus referred to authorities regarded in medieval Europe as younger than the Greco-Roman scholars of Classical antiquity and/or the Church Fathers of the Christian era, but not necessarily to the present day, and could include authors several centuries old, from about the time of Bede, i.e. referring to the time after the foundation of the Order of Saint Benedict and/or the fall of the Western Roman Empire.

The Latin adjective was adopted in Middle French, as moderne, by the 15th century, and hence, in the early Tudor period, into Early Modern English. The early modern word meant "now existing", or "about the present times", not necessarily with a positive connotation. English author and playwright William Shakespeare used the term modern in the sense of "everyday, ordinary, commonplace".

The word entered wide usage in the context of the late 17th-century quarrel of the Ancients and the Moderns within the Académie Française, debating the question of "Is Modern culture superior to Classical (Græco–Roman) culture?" In the context of this debate, the ancients (anciens) and moderns (modernes) were proponents of opposing views, the former believing that contemporary writers could do no better than imitate the genius of Classical antiquity, while the latter, first with Charles Perrault (1687), proposed that more than a mere Renaissance of ancient achievements, the Age of Reason had gone beyond what had been possible in the Classical period of the Greco-Roman civilization. The term modernity, first coined in the 1620s, in this context assumed the implication of a historical epoch following the Renaissance, in which the achievements of antiquity were surpassed.

== Phases ==
Modernity has been associated with cultural and intellectual movements of 1436–1789 and extending to the 1970s or later.

According to Marshall Berman, modernity is periodized into three conventional phases dubbed "Early", "Classical", and "Late" by Peter Osborne:

- Early modernity: 1500–1789 (or 1453–1789 in traditional historiography)
  - People were beginning to experience a more modern life (Laughey, 31).
- Classical modernity: 1789–1900 (corresponding to the long 19th century (1789–1914) in Hobsbawm's scheme)
  - Consisted of the rise and growing use of daily newspapers, telegraphs, telephones and other forms of mass media, which influenced the growth of communicating on a broader scale (Laughey, 31).
- Late modernity: 1900–1989
  - Consisted of the globalization of modern life (Laughey, 31).

In the second phase, Berman draws upon the growth of modern technologies such as the newspaper, telegraph, and other forms of mass media. There was a great shift into modernization in the name of industrial capitalism. Finally, in the third phase, modernist arts and individual creativity marked the beginning of a new modernist age as it combats oppressive politics, economics as well as other social forces including mass media.

Some authors, such as Lyotard and Baudrillard, believe that modernity ended in the mid- or late 20th century and thus have defined a period subsequent to modernity, namely Postmodernity (1930s/1950s/1990s–present). Other theorists, however, regard the period from the late 20th century to the present as merely another phase of modernity; Zygmunt Bauman calls this phase liquid modernity, Giddens labels it high modernity (see High modernism).

== Definitions ==
=== Political ===
Politically, modernity's earliest phase is stated by some historians to start with the works of Niccolò Machiavelli, a political thinker whom many commentators claim openly rejected the classical theories on politics in favor of new and original ways to think about conduct in civil government, and outwardly disagreed with the classical approach to political history. Machiavelli argued, for example, that violent divisions within political communities are unavoidable, but can also be a source of strength which statesmen should account for and even encourage in some ways. Machiavelli's championing of stringent measures in favor of political good, and his willingness to reject the Christian thought of his time have all been viewed as modern claims.

Machiavelli viewed that republics are, in general, more trustworthy, more flexible in that they can elect leaders that are able to adapt to the times, and that public opinion can be relied upon more than the opinion of princes. However, he believed that republics needed the same glory seeking leader that was described in The Prince. For example, Machiavelli viewed that there could never be a republic or kingdom that had good orders unless it was founded by a man who was "one alone" (uno solo), or had absolute power. Machiavelli praised the Roman institution of the dictatorship, and stated that it "produced great effects" for Rome, in contrast to other political thinkers who either decried this practice or who omitted it from their works.

Starting with Thomas Hobbes, attempts were made to use the methods of the new modern physical sciences, as proposed by Bacon and Descartes, applied to humanity and politics. Notable attempts to improve upon the methodological approach of Hobbes include those of John Locke, Spinoza, Giambattista Vico, and Rousseau. David Hume made what he considered to be the first proper attempt at trying to apply Bacon's scientific method to political subjects, rejecting some aspects of the approach of Hobbes.

Modernist republicanism openly influenced the foundation of republics during the Dutch Revolt (1568–1609), English Civil War (1642–1651), American Revolution (1775–1783), the French Revolution (1789–1799), and the Haitian Revolution (1791–1804).

A second phase of modernist political thinking begins with Rousseau, who questioned the natural rationality and sociality of humanity and proposed that human nature was much more malleable than had been previously thought. By this logic, what makes a good political system or a good man is completely dependent upon the chance path a whole people has taken over history. This thought influenced the political (and aesthetic) thinking of Immanuel Kant, Edmund Burke, and others and led to a critical review of modernist politics. On the conservative side, Burke argued that this understanding encouraged caution and avoidance of radical change. However, more ambitious movements also developed from this insight into human culture, initially Romanticism and Historicism, and eventually both the Communism of Karl Marx, and the modern forms of nationalism inspired by the French Revolution, including, in one extreme, the German Nazi movement.

On the other hand, the notion of modernity has been contested also due to its Euro-centric underpinnings. Postcolonial scholars have extensively critiqued the Eurocentric nature of modernity, particularly its portrayal as a linear process originating in Europe and subsequently spreading—or being imposed—on the rest of the world. Dipesh Chakrabarty contends that European historicism positions Europe as the exclusive birthplace of modernity, placing European thinkers and institutions at the center of Enlightenment, progress, and innovation. Latin America's version of modernity is a prime example of a contradiction to European modernity. During Europe's imperial conquest, ultimately created a dominant version of colonialism that the world would associate with modernity, Mexico provided an alternative version of modernity that contradicted the brutal and harsh nature of colonial Europe. This narrative marginalizes non-Western thinkers, ideas, and achievements, reducing them to either deviations from or delays in an otherwise supposedly universal trajectory of modern development. Frantz Fanon similarly exposes the hypocrisy of European modernity, which promotes ideals of progress and rationality while concealing how much of Europe’s economic growth was built on the exploitation, violence, and dehumanization integral to colonial domination. Similarly, Bhambra argued that beyond economic advancement, Western powers "modernized" through colonialism, demonstrating that developments such as the welfare systems in England were largely enabled by the wealth extracted through colonial exploitation.

=== Sociological ===
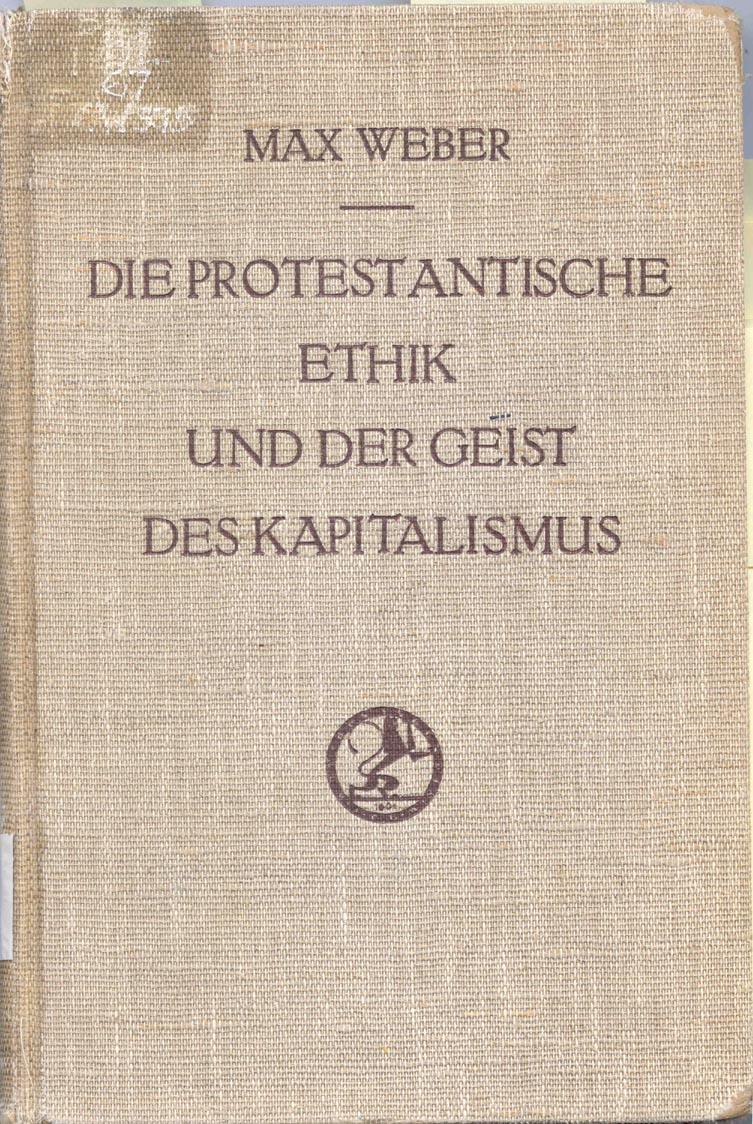
Cover of the original German edition of Max Weber's The Protestant Ethic and the Spirit of Capitalism

In sociology, a discipline that arose in direct response to the social problems of modernity, the term most generally refers to the social conditions, processes, and discourses consequent to the Age of Enlightenment. In the most basic terms, British sociologist Anthony Giddens describes modernity as

...a shorthand term for modern society, or industrial civilization. Portrayed in more detail, it is associated with (1) a certain set of attitudes towards the world, the idea of the world as open to transformation, by human intervention; (2) a complex of economic institutions, especially industrial production and a market economy; (3) a certain range of political institutions, including the nation-state and mass democracy. Largely as a result of these characteristics, modernity is vastly more dynamic than any previous type of social order. It is a society—more technically, a complex of institutions—which, unlike any preceding culture, lives in the future, rather than the past.

Other writers have criticized such definitions as just being a listing of factors. They argue that modernity, contingently understood as marked by an ontological formation in dominance, needs to be defined much more fundamentally in terms of different ways of being.

The modern is thus defined by the way in which prior valences of social life ... are reconstituted through a constructivist reframing of social practices in relation to basic categories of existence common to all humans: time, space, embodiment, performance and knowledge. The word 'reconstituted' here explicitly does not mean replaced.

This means that modernity overlays earlier formations of traditional and customary life without necessarily replacing them. In a 2006 review essay, historian Michael Saler extended and substantiated this premise, noting that scholarship had revealed historical perspectives on modernity that encompassed both enchantment and disenchantment. Late Victorians, for instance, "discussed science in terms of magical influences and vital correspondences, and when vitalism began to be superseded by more mechanistic explanations in the 1830s, magic still remained part of the discourse—now called 'natural magic,' to be sure, but no less 'marvelous' for being the result of determinate and predictable natural processes." Mass culture, despite its "superficialities, irrationalities, prejudices, and problems," became "a vital source of contingent and rational enchantments as well." Occultism could contribute to the conclusions reached by modern psychologists and advanced a "satisfaction" found in this mass culture. In addition, Saler observed that "different accounts of modernity may stress diverse combinations or accentuate some factors more than others...Modernity is defined less by binaries arranged in an implicit hierarchy, or by the dialectical transformation of one term into its opposite, than by unresolved contradictions and oppositions, or antinomies: modernity is Janus-faced."

In 2020 Jason Crawford critiqued this recent historiography on enchantment and modernity. The historical evidence of "enchantments" for these studies, particularly in mass and print cultures, "might offer some solace to the citizens of a disenchanted world, but they don't really change the condition of that world." These "enchantments" offered a "troubled kind of unreality" increasingly separate from modernity. Per Osterrgard and James Fitchett advanced a thesis that mass culture, while generating sources for "enchantment", more commonly produced "simulations" of "enchantments" and "disenchantments" for consumers.

Of the available conceptual definitions in sociology, modernity is "marked and defined by an obsession with 'evidence'", visual culture, and personal visibility. Generally, the large-scale social integration constituting modernity, involves:

- increased movement of goods, capital, people, and information among formerly discrete populations, and consequent influence beyond the local area
- increased formal social organization of mobile populaces, development of "circuits" on which they and their influence travel, and societal standardization conducive to socio-economic mobility
- increased specialization of the segments of society, i.e., division of labor, and area inter-dependency
- increased level of excessive stratification in terms of social life of a modern man
- Increased state of dehumanisation, dehumanity, unionisation, as man became embittered about the negative turn of events which sprouted a growing fear.
- man became a victim of the underlying circumstances presented by the modern world
- Increased competitiveness among people in the society (survival of the fittest) as the jungle rule sets in.

=== Cultural and philosophical ===
The era of modernity is characterised socially by industrialisation and the division of labour, and this test. and philosophically by "the loss of certainty, and the realization that certainty can never be established, once and for all". With new social and philosophical conditions arose fundamental new challenges. Various 19th-century intellectuals, from Auguste Comte to Karl Marx to Sigmund Freud, attempted to offer scientific and/or political ideologies in the wake of secularisation. Modernity may be described as the "age of ideology".

For Marx what was the basis of modernity was the emergence of capitalism and the revolutionary bourgeoisie, which led to an unprecedented expansion of productive forces and to the creation of the world market. Durkheim tackled modernity from a different angle by following the ideas of Saint-Simon about the industrial system. Although the starting point is the same as Marx, feudal society, Durkheim emphasizes far less the rising of the bourgeoisie as a new revolutionary class and very seldom refers to capitalism as the new mode of production implemented by it. The fundamental impulse to modernity is rather industrialism accompanied by the new scientific forces. In the work of Max Weber, modernity is closely associated with the processes of rationalization and disenchantment of the world.

Critical theorists such as Theodor Adorno and Zygmunt Bauman propose that modernity or industrialization represents a departure from the central tenets of the Enlightenment and towards nefarious processes of alienation, such as commodity fetishism and the Holocaust. Contemporary sociological critical theory presents the concept of rationalization in even more negative terms than those Weber originally defined. Processes of rationalization—as progress for the sake of progress—may in many cases have what critical theory says is a negative and dehumanising effect on modern society.

Enlightenment, understood in the widest sense as the advance of thought, has always aimed at liberating human beings from fear and installing them as masters. Yet the wholly enlightened earth radiates under the sign of disaster triumphant.

What prompts so many commentators to speak of the 'end of history', of post-modernity, 'second modernity' and 'surmodernity', or otherwise to articulate the intuition of a radical change in the arrangement of human cohabitation and in social conditions under which life-politics is nowadays conducted, is the fact that the long effort to accelerate the speed of movement has presently reached its 'natural limit'. Power can move with the speed of the electronic signal – and so the time required for the movement of its essential ingredients has been reduced to instantaneity. For all practical purposes, power has become truly exterritorial, no longer bound, or even slowed down, by the resistance of space (the advent of cellular telephones may well serve as a symbolic 'last blow' delivered to the dependency on space: even the access to a telephone market is unnecessary for a command to be given and seen through to its effect.

Consequent to debate about economic globalization, the comparative analysis of civilizations, and the post-colonial perspective of "alternative modernities", Shmuel Eisenstadt introduced the concept of "multiple modernities". Modernity as a "plural condition" is the central concept of this sociologic approach and perspective, which broadens the definition of "modernity" from exclusively denoting Western European culture to a culturally relativistic definition, thereby: "Modernity is not Westernization, and its key processes and dynamics can be found in all societies".

=== Secularization ===
Central to modernity is emancipation from religion, specifically the hegemony of Christianity (mainly Roman Catholicism), and the consequent secularization. According to writers like Fackenheim and Husserl, modern thought repudiates the Judeo-Christian belief in the Biblical God as a mere relic of superstitious ages. (Note: Quotation from Fackenheim 1957, 272–73: But there does seem to be a necessary conflict between modern thought and the Biblical belief in revelation. All claims of revelation, modern science and philosophy seem agreed, must be repudiated, as mere relics of superstitious ages. ... [to a modern phylosopher] The Biblical God...was a mere myth of bygone ages. Quotation from Husserl 1931,: When, with the beginning of modern times, religious belief was becoming more and more externalized as a lifeless convention, men of intellect were lifted by a new belief, their great belief in an autonomous philosophy and science.) It all started with Descartes's revolutionary methodic doubt, which transformed the concept of truth in the concept of certainty, whose only guarantor is no longer God or the Church, but Man's subjective judgement. (Note: Quotation from Heidegger 1938: The essence of modernity can be seen in humanity's freeing itself from the bonds of Middle Ages... Certainly the modern age has, as a consequence of the liberation of humanity, introduced subjectivism and individualism. ... For up to Descartes... The claim [of a self-supported, unshakable foundation of truth, in the sense of certainty] originates in that emancipation of man in which he frees himself from obligation to Christian revelational truth and Church doctrine to a legislating for himself that takes its stand upon itself.)

Theologians have adapted in different ways to the challenge of modernity. Liberal theology, over perhaps the past 200 years or so, has tried, in various iterations, to accommodate, or at least tolerate, modern doubt in expounding Christian revelation, while Traditionalist Catholics, Eastern Orthodox and fundamentalist Protestant thinkers and clerics have tried to fight back, denouncing skepticism of every kind. (Note: Quotation from Kilby 2004, 262:... a cluster of issues surrounding the assessment of modernity and of the apologetic task of theology in modernity. Both men [Rahner and Balthasar] were deeply concerned with apologetics, with the question of how to present Christianity in a world which is no longer well-disposed towards it. ... both thought that modernity raised particular problems for being a believing Christian, and therefore for apologetics.) Modernity aimed towards "a progressive force promising to liberate humankind from ignorance and irrationality".

=== Scientific ===
In the 16th and 17th centuries, Copernicus, Kepler, Galileo, and others developed a new approach to physics and astronomy which changed the way people came to think about many things. Copernicus presented new models of the Solar System which no longer placed humanity's home, Earth, in the centre. Kepler used mathematics to discuss physics and described the regularities of nature this way. Galileo actually made his famous proof of uniform acceleration in freefall using mathematics.

Francis Bacon, especially in his Novum Organum, argued for a new methodological approach. It was an experimental-based approach to science, which sought no knowledge of formal or final causes. Yet, he was no materialist. He also talked of the two books of God, God's Word (Scripture) and God's work (nature). But he also added a theme that science should seek to control nature for the sake of humanity, and not seek to understand it just for the sake of understanding. In both these things, he was influenced by Machiavelli's earlier criticism of medieval Scholasticism, and his proposal that leaders should aim to control their own fortune.

Influenced both by Galileo's new physics and Bacon, René Descartes argued soon afterward that mathematics and geometry provided a model of how scientific knowledge could be built up in small steps. He also argued openly that human beings themselves could be understood as complex machines.

Isaac Newton, influenced by Descartes, but also, like Bacon, a proponent of experimentation, provided the archetypal example of how both Cartesian mathematics, geometry and theoretical deduction on the one hand, and Baconian experimental observation and induction on the other hand, together could lead to great advances in the practical understanding of regularities in nature.

=== Technological ===
One common conception of modernity is the condition of Western history since the mid-15th century, or roughly the European development of movable type and the printing press. In this context, modern society is said to have developed over many periods and to be influenced by important events that represent breaks in the continuity.

=== Artistic ===
After modernist political thinking had already become widely known in France, Rousseau's re-examination of human nature led to a new criticism of the value of reasoning itself which in turn led to a new understanding of less rationalistic human activities, especially the arts. The initial influence was upon the movements known as German Idealism and Romanticism in the 18th and 19th centuries. Modern art therefore belongs only to the later phases of modernity.

For this reason art history keeps the term modernity distinct from the terms Modern Age and Modernism – as a discrete "term applied to the cultural condition in which the seemingly absolute necessity of innovation becomes a primary fact of life, work, and thought". And modernity in art "is more than merely the state of being modern, or the opposition between old and new".

In the essay "The Painter of Modern Life" (1863), Charles Baudelaire gives a literary definition: "By modernity, I mean the transitory, the fugitive, the contingent".

Advancing technological innovation, affecting artistic technique and the means of manufacture, changed rapidly the possibilities of art and its status in a rapidly changing society. Photography challenged the place of the painter and painting. Architecture was transformed by the availability of steel for structures.

=== Theological ===
From conservative Protestant theologian Thomas C. Oden's perspective, modernity is marked by "four fundamental values":

- "Moral relativism (which says that what is right is dictated by culture, social location, and situation)"
- "Autonomous individualism (which assumes that moral authority comes essentially from within)"
- "Narcissistic hedonism (which focuses on egocentric personal pleasure)"
- "Reductive naturalism (which reduces what is reliably known to what one can see, hear, and empirically investigate)"

Modernity rejects anything "old" and makes "novelty ... a criterion for truth". This results in a great "phobic response to anything antiquarian". In contrast, "classical Christian consciousness" resisted "novelty".

Within Roman Catholicism, Popes Pius IX and Pius X ruled that Modernism (in a particular definition of the Catholic Church) was a danger to the Christian faith. Pope Pius IX compiled a Syllabus of Errors, published on 8 December 1864, to describe his objections to Modernism. Pope Pius X further elaborated on the characteristics and consequences of Modernism, from his perspective, in an encyclical letter entitled Pascendi Dominici gregis ("Feeding the Lord's Flock") on 8 September 1907. Pascendi Dominici gregis stated that the principles of Modernism, taken to a logical conclusion, led to atheism. The Roman Catholic Church was serious enough about the threat of Modernism that it required all Roman Catholic clergy, pastors, confessors, preachers, religious superiors and seminary professors to swear an Oath against modernism from 1910 until this directive was rescinded in 1967, in keeping with the directives of the Second Vatican Council.

The Second Vatican Council provided a new Catholic vision of the modern world and its own relationship with it. The Council's decree on "the apostolate of the laity" (November 1965) asserts that "modern conditions" require the apostolate of lay Catholics to be "broadened and intensified", describing "constantly increasing population, continual progress in science and technology, and closer interpersonal relationships" as indicators of modernity and that "many areas of human life have become increasingly autonomous", which is "as it should be", although this autonomy "sometimes involves a degree of departure from the ethical and religious order and a serious danger to Christian life".

== See also ==
- Buddhist modernism – New movements based on reinterpreted Buddhism
- East-West Cultural Debate
- Ecomodernism – Environmental movement emphasizing technological innovation for sustainability
- Hypermodernity – Stage of society in postmodernism
- Industrialization
- Islam and modernity
- Late modernity – Sociological concept
- Mass society – Sociological concept
- Meta modernism
- Modern Orthodox Judaism – Movement in Orthodox Judaism
- Modernism (Roman Catholicism)
- Mythopoeic thought – Hypothetical stage of human thought
- Postmodernity – Societal state after modernity
- Rationalization (sociology) – Rationality tending to replace tradition
- Second modernity – Transformation into information society
- Traditional society – Society based on custom and habit
- Transmodernity – Philosophical concept
- Urbanization – Process of population movement to cities

== Bibliography ==
- Adorno, Theodor W. 1973. Negative Dialectics, translated by E.B. Ashton. New York: Seabury Press; London: Routledge. (Originally published as Negative Dialektik, Frankfurt a.M.: Suhrkamp, 1966.)
- d'Alembert, Jean Le Rond. 2009 [1751]. "Preliminary Discourse", The Encyclopedia of Diderot & d'Alembert Collaborative Translation Project, translated by Richard N. Schwab and Walter . Ann Arbor: Scholarly Publishing Office of the University of Michigan Library (accessed 19 December 2010).
- Alexander, Franz. 1931. "Psychoanalysis and Medicine" (lecture read before the Harvey Society in New York on January 15, 1931). Journal of the American Medical Association 96, no. 17:1351–1358. Reprinted in Mental Hygiene 16 (1932): 63–84. Reprinted in Franz Alexander, The Scope of Psychoanalysis, 1921–1961: Selected Papers, 483–500. New York: Basic Books, 1961.
- Almond, Gabriel Abraham; Chodorow, Marvin; Pearce, Roy Harvey (1982). Progress and Its Discontents. University of California Press. ISBN 9780520044784.
- Bacon, Francis. 1828. Of the Proficience and Advancement of Learning, Divine and Human. London: J. F. Dove.
- Barker, Chris. 2005. Cultural Studies: Theory and Practice. London: Sage. ISBN 0-7619-4156-8.
- Baudelaire, Charles. 1964. The Painter of Modern Life and Other Essays, edited and translated by Jonathan Mayne. London: Phaidon Press.
- Bauman, Zygmunt. 1989. Modernity and the Holocaust. Cambridge: Polity Press.; Ithaca, N.Y.: Cornell University Press. ISBN 0-7456-0685-7 (Polity, cloth); ISBN 0-7456-0930-9 (Polity, 1991 pbk), ISBN 0-8014-8719-6 (Cornell, cloth), ISBN 0-8014-2397-X (Cornell, pbk).
- Bauman, Zygmunt. 2000. "Liquid Modernity". Cambridge: Polity Press. ISBN 0-7456-2409-X.
- Berman, Marshall. 1982. All That Is Solid Melts into Air: The Experience of Modernity. New York: Simon and Schuster. ISBN 0-671-24602-X. London: Verso. ISBN 0-86091-785-1. Paperback reprint New York: Viking Penguin, 1988. ISBN 0-14-010962-5.
- Berman, Marshall. 2010. All That Is Solid Melts into Air: The Experience of Modernity. London and Brooklyn: Verso. ISBN 978-1-84467-644-6
- Berns, Laurence. 1987. "Thomas Hobbes". In History of Political Philosophy, third edition, edited by Leo Strauss and Joseph Cropsey, 369–420. Chicago: University of Chicago Press.
- Bhambra, Gurminder K. (2015). "Modernity: History of the Concept". International Encyclopedia of the Social & Behavioral Sciences. International Encyclopedia of the Social & Behavioral Sciences (Second Edition). pp. 692–696. doi:10.1016/B978-0-08-097086-8.03134-2. ISBN 978-0-08-097087-5.
- Bock, Gisela, Quentin Skinner, and Maurizio Viroli. 1990. Machiavelli and Republicanism. Ideas in Context. Cambridge and New York: Cambridge University Press. ISBN 0-521-38376-5.
- Cassirer, Ernst. 1944. An Essay on Man: An Introduction to a Philosophy of Human Culture. Chapter 1.3. New Haven: Yale University Press; London: H. Milford, Oxford University Press. Reprinted, Garden City, NY: Doubleday, 1953; New Haven: Yale University Press, 1962, 1972, 1992. ISBN 0-300-00034-0.
- Calinescu, Matei. 1987. "Five Faces of Modernity: Modernism, Avant-garde, Decadence, Kitsch, Postmodernism". Durham: Duke University Press. ISBN 0822307677.
- Call, Lewis. 2003. Postmodern Anarchism. Lanham, Boulder, New York and Oxford: Lexington Books. ISBN 978-0739105221.
- Davies, Oliver (2004). "The Theological Aesthetics". In Oakes, Edward T.; Moss, David (eds.). The Cambridge Companion to Hans Urs von Balthasar. Cambridge and New York: Cambridge University Press. pp. 131–142. ISBN 0-521-89147-7.
- Delanty, Gerard. 2007. "Modernity." Blackwell Encyclopedia of Sociology, edited by George Ritzer. 11 vols. Malden, Mass.: Blackwell Publishing. ISBN 1-4051-2433-4.
- Eisenstadt, Shmuel Noah. 2003. Comparative Civilizations and Multiple Modernities, 2 vols. Leiden and Boston: Brill.
- Fackenheim, Emil L. 1957. Martin Buber's Concept of Revelation. [Canada]: s.n.
- Foucault, Michel. 1975. Surveiller et punir: naissance de la prison. [Paris]: Gallimard.
- Foucault, Michel. 1977. Discipline and Punish: The Birth of the Prison, translated by Alan Sheridan. London: Penguin Books, Ltd. ISBN 978-0-14-013722-4. American edition, New York: Pantheon Books, 1978. ISBN 9780394499420. Second Vintage reprint edition, New York and Toronto: Vintage Books, 1995. ISBN 0-679-75255-2
- Freund, Walter. 1957. Modernus und andere Zeitbegriffe des Mittelalters. Neue Münstersche Beiträge zur Geschichtsforschung 4, Cologne and Graz: Böhlau Verlag.
- Giddens, Anthony. 1998. Conversations with Anthony Giddens: Making Sense of Modernity. Stanford, Calif.: Stanford University Press. ISBN 0-8047-3568-9 (cloth) ISBN 0-8047-3569-7 (pbk).
- Goldwin, Robert. 1987. "John Locke". In History of Political Philosophy, third edition, edited by Leo Strauss and Joseph Cropsey, 476–512. Chicago: University of Chicago Press. ISBN 0-226-77708-1 (cloth); 0226777103 (pbk).
- Goody, Jack (2013). Capitalism and Modernity: The Great Debate. Wiley. ISBN 9780745637990.
- Hall, Christopher A. 1990. "Back to the Fathers" (interview with Thomas Oden). Christianity Today (24 September; reissued online, 21 October 2011) (accessed 03/27/2015).
- Harriss, John. 2000. "The Second Great Transformation? Capitalism at the End of the Twentieth Century." In Poverty and Development into the 21st Century, revised edition, edited by Tim Allen and Alan Thomas, 325–42. Oxford and New York: Open University in association with Oxford University Press. ISBN 0-19-877626-8.
- Hartmann, Wilfried. 1974. "'Modernus' und 'Antiquus': Zur Verbreitung und Bedeutung dieser Bezeichnungen in der wissenschaftlichen Literatur vom 9. bis zum 12. Jahrhundert". In Antiqui und Moderni: Traditionsbewußtsein und Fortschrittsbewußtsein im späten Mittelalter, edited by Albert Zimmermann, 21–39. Miscellanea Mediaevalia 9. Berlin and New York: Walter de Gruyter. ISBN 978-3-11-004538-3
- Heidegger, Martin. 1938. "Die Zeit des Weltbildes". Two English translations, both as "The Age of the World Picture", in Martin Heidegger, The Question Concerning Technology, and Other Essays, translated by William Lovitt, 115–54, Harper Colophon Books (New York: Harper & Row, 1977) ISBN 0-06-131969-4 (New York: Garland Publications, 1977) ISBN 0-8240-2427-3, and (this essay translated by Julian Young) in Martin Heidegger, Off the Beaten Track, edited and translated by Julian Young and Kenneth Haynes, 57–85 (Cambridge and New York: Cambridge University Press, 2002). ISBN 0-521-80507-4.
- Henry, John. 2004. "Science and the Coming of Enlightenment" in The Enlightenment World, edited by Martin Fitzpatrick et al.
- Hroch, Jaroslav; Hollan, David (1998). National, Cultural, and Ethnic Identities: Harmony Beyond Conflict. Council for Research in Values and philosophy. ISBN 9781565181137.
- Hume, David. 1896 [1739]. A Treatise of Human Nature, edited by Sir Amherst Selby Bigge, K.C.B. Oxford: Clarendon Press.
- Husserl, Edmund. 1931. Méditations cartésiennes: Introduction á la phénoménologie, translated by Gabrielle Peiffer and Emmanuel Lévinas. Bibliothèque Société Francaise de Philosophie. Paris: A. Colin.
- Ihde, Don (2009). "Technology and politics". In Olsen, Jan Kyrre Berg; Pedersen, Stig Andur; Hendricks, Vincent F. (eds.). A Companion to the Philosophy of Technology. Wiley. ISBN 9781405146012.
- James, Paul. 2015. "They Have Never Been Modern? Then What Is the Problem with Those Persians?". In Making Modernity from the Mashriq to the Maghreb, edited by Stephen Pascoe, Virginie Rey, and Paul James, 31–54. Melbourne: Arena Publications..
- Kennington, Richard. 2004. On Modern Origins: Essays in Early Modern Philosophy, edited by Pamela Kraus and Frank Hunt. Lanham, Md.: Lexington Books. ISBN 0-7391-0814-X (cloth); ISBN 0-7391-0815-8 (pbk).
- Kilby, Karen. 2004. "Balthasar and Karl Rahner". In The Cambridge Companion to Hans Urs von Balthasar, edited by Edward T. Oakes and David Moss, 256–68. Cambridge and New York: Cambridge University Press. ISBN 0-521-89147-7.
- Kompridis, Nikolas. 2006. "The Idea of a New Beginning: A Romantic Source of Normativity and Freedom". In Philosophical Romanticism, edited by Nikolas Kompridis, 32–59. Abingdon, UK and New York: Routledge. ISBN 0-415-25643-7 (hbk) ISBN 0-415-25644-5 (pbk) ISBN 0-203-50737-1 (ebk)
- Larraín, Jorge. 2000. "Identity and Modernity in Latin America". Cambridge, UK: Polity; Malden, MA: Blackwell. ISBN 0-7456-2623-8 (cloth); ISBN 0-7456-2624-6 (pbk).
- Laughey, Dan. 2007. Key Themes in Media Theory. New York: University Open Press.
- Leppert, Richard. 2004. "The Social Discipline of Listening." In Aural Cultures, edited by Jim Drobnick, 19–35. Toronto: YYZ Books; Banff: Walter Phillips Gallery Editions. ISBN 0-920397-80-8.
- Mandeville, Bernard. 1714. The Fable of the Bees, or, Private Vices, Publick Benefits. London: Printed for J. Roberts. Ninth edition, as The Fable of the Bees, or, Private Vices, Public Benefits ... with an Essay on Charity and Charity-Schools and a Search into the Nature of Society, to Which Is Added, a Vindication of the Book from the Aspersions Contained in a Presentment of the Grand Jury of Middlesex, and an Abusive Letter to the Lord C.. Edinburgh: Printed for W. Gray and W. Peter, 1755.
- Mansfield, Harvey (1993), Taming the Prince, The Johns Hopkins University Press
- Norris, Christopher. 1995. "Modernism." In The Oxford Companion to Philosophy, edited by Ted Honderich, 583. Oxford and New York: Oxford University Press. ISBN 978-0-19-866132-0.
- O'Donnell, James J. 1979. Cassiodorus. Berkeley, California: University of California Press. ISBN 0-520036-46-8.
- Orwin, Clifford, and Nathan Tarcov. 1997. The Legacy of Rousseau. Chicago: University of Chicago Press. ISBN 0-226-63855-3 (cloth); ISBN 0-226-63856-1 (pbk).
- Osborne, Peter. 1992. "Modernity Is a Qualitative, Not a Chronological, Category: Notes on the Dialectics of Differential Historical Time". In Postmodernism and the Re-reading of Modernity, edited by Francis Barker, Peter Hulme, and Margaret Iversen. Essex Symposia, Literature, Politics, Theory. Manchester: Manchester University Press. ISBN 0-7190-3745-X.
- Pius IX (1864). "The Syllabus of Errors". Papal Encyclicals Online.
- Pius X. 1907. "Pascendi Dominici gregis" (Encyclical on the Doctrines of the Modernists). Vatican website (accessed 25 September 2018)
- Pius X. 1910. "The Oath Against Modernism". Papal Encyclicals Online (accessed 25 September 2018).
- Rahe, Paul A. 2006. Machiavelli's Liberal Republican Legacy. Cambridge and New York: Cambridge University Press. ISBN 978-0-521-85187-9.
- Regilme, Salvador Santino F., Jr. 2012. "Social Discipline, Democracy, and Modernity: Are They All Uniquely 'European'?". Hamburg Review of Social Sciences 6, no. 3 / 7. no. 1:94–117. (Archive from 24 May 2013, accessed 6 December 2017.)
- Rosen, Stanley. 1987. "Benedict Spinoza". In History of Political Philosophy, third edition, edited by Leo Strauss and Joseph Cropsey, 456–475. Chicago: University of Chicago Press.
- Rosenau, Pauline Marie. 1992. Post-modernism and the Social Sciences: Insights, Inroads, and Intrusions. Princeton, N.J.: Princeton University Press. ISBN 0-691-08619-2 (cloth) ISBN 0-691-02347-6 (pbk).
- Rousseau, Jean-Jacques. 1997. The Discourses and Other Political Writings, edited and translated by Victor Gourevitch. Cambridge Texts in the History of Political Thought. Cambridge and New York: Cambridge University Press. ISBN 0-521-41381-8 (cloth); ISBN 0-521-42445-3 (pbk).
- Saul, John Ralston. 1992. Voltaire's Bastards: The Dictatorship of Reason in the West. New York: Free Press; Maxwell Macmillan International. ISBN 0-02-927725-6.
- Smith, Terry. 2003. "Modernity". Grove Art Online. Oxford Art Online. (Subscription access, accessed September 21, 2009).
- Strauss, Leo. 1958. Thoughts on Machiavelli. Chicago: University of Chicago Press. ISBN 0-226-77702-2.
- Strauss, Leo. 1987. "Niccolò Machiavelli". In History of Political Philosophy, third edition, edited by Leo Strauss and Joseph Cropsey, 296–317. Chicago: University of Chicago Press. ISBN 0-226-77708-1 (cloth); ISBN 0-226-77710-3 (pbk).
- Toulmin, Stephen Edelston. 1990. Cosmopolis: The Hidden Agenda of Modernity. New York: Free Press. ISBN 0-02-932631-1. Paperback reprint 1992, Chicago: University of Chicago Press. ISBN 0-226-80838-6.
- Vico, Giambattista. 1984. The New Science of Giambattista Vico: Unabridged Translation of the Third Edition (1744), with the Addition of "Practice of the New Science, edited by Thomas Goddard Bergin and Max Harold Fisch. Cornell Paperbacks. Ithaca: Cornell University Press. ISBN 0-8014-9265-3 (pbk).
- Webster, Henry Kitchell (October 2008). Early European History. Forgotten Books. ISBN 978-1606209356.
