= Ruth Gay =

Jewish writer

- Born: Ruth Slotkin; October 19, 1922; New York
- Died: May 9, 2006 (aged 83)
- Education: Queens College; Columbia University
- Spouse(s): Nathan Glazer (m. 1942; div. 1957) Peter Gay (m. 1959)
- Children: 3
- Honors: National Jewish Book Award

Ruth Gay (née Slotkin; October 19, 1922 – May 9, 2006) was an American writer whose work concerned Jewish life. She won the 1997 National Jewish Book Award for non-fiction for Unfinished People: Eastern European Jews Encounter America (1996).

== Early life and education ==
Ruth Slotkin was born to Harry Slotkin and Mary (Pfeffer) Slotkin on October 19, 1922, in New York City. Although she grew up in The Bronx, her family moved to Queens due to her father's job. As a result, she transferred to Queens College, where she was a member of the leftist student Zionist organization.

Slotkin earned a bachelor's degree from Queens College and a master's in library science from Columbia University in 1969.

== Career ==
From 1948 to 1950 she was the editor of the JDC Review of the American Jewish Joint Distribution Committee.

In 1997, Gay received the National Jewish Book Award for nonfiction for her book "Unfinished People: Eastern European Jews Encounter America."

In 2002, she published "Safe Among the Germans: Liberated Jews After World War II" through Yale University Press.

== Personal life ==
Ruth Slotkin was first married to sociologist Nathan Glazer in 1942; during this 15-year marriage they had three daughters. She published extensively in Commentary and other publications during this period. They divorced in 1957.

Slotkin married historian Peter Gay in 1959.

Gay died in 2006 from leukemia.

== Publications ==
- Safe among the Germans liberated Jews after World War II (New Haven, CT: Yale University Press, 2002)
- Unfinished People: Eastern European Jews Encounter America (New York, NY: W. W. Norton & Company, 1997)
- The Jews of Germany: A Historical Portrait (New Haven, CT: Yale University Press, 1992)
