= The Enlightenment: An Interpretation =

Two-volume work by Peter Gay

- Author: Peter Gay
- Language: English
- Subject: Modernism
- Publisher: Knopf
- Publication date: 1966–1969
- Publication place: United States
- Media type: Print (Hardcover and Paperback)
- Award: 1967 National Book Award for Nonfiction
- ISBN: 978-0393313024

The Enlightenment: An Interpretation is an influential two-volume history of the Age of Enlightenment by Peter Gay, published between 1966 and 1969. The first volume, subtitled "The Rise of Modern Paganism," won the National Book Award in 1967. The second volume, subtitled “The Science of Freedom," was published in 1969.

== Summary ==
The first volume, "The Rise of Modern Paganism," focuses on foundations of Enlightenment thought, covering the influence of Greek philosophers, pagan belief, and Christian theology. The second volume, "The Science of Freedom," describes how this system was applied to various spheres, particularly the social sciences, including political economy, history, and sociology.

Gay presents the Enlightenment as the unified work of a small group of men, "the little flock," who share a critical method and knew and admired one another's work. These thinkers are dominated by French figures, including Montesquieu, Voltaire, Denis Diderot, Jean le Rond d'Alembert, Anne Robert Jacques Turgot, and the Marquis de Condorcet. Gay also refers to Britons John Locke and David Hume, the Genevan Jean-Jacques Rousseau, the German Immanuel Kant, and the American Benjamin Franklin. Gay emphasizes the empirical attitudes of these thinkers and praises their liberal attitudes.

== Reception ==
The Enlightenment: An Interpretation has been praised for its breadth of scholarship and readable style, and is seen as rehabilitating the reputation of Enlightenment thinkers, particularly Scottish philosopher David Hume. Margaret Jacob, a professor of history at UCLA, described it as "canonical" and "the last great work to provide a synthetic account of the philosophes and their world."

In the early part of the 20th century, historians like Carl Becker had criticized the work of the philosophes as perpetuating the dogmatic attitude of the Middle Ages. These thinkers, wrote Becker in The Heavenly City of the Eighteenth-Century Philosophers, only replaced the sureties of Christian faith with their own hyper-rationalist Utopia. Writing in The New York Times, George L. Mosse describes The Enlightenment: An Interpretation as a "watershed in 18th-century historiography" which sought to undo these charges. By meeting Enlightenment thinkers "on their own ground," says Mosse, Gay presents them as a "group of intellectuals who believed that man's unfettered use of his critical mind would lead all mankind into a better future." The historian Nicholas Hudson of the University of British Columbia describes the work as "a barely disguised defense of an optimistic secular liberalism opposed both to pessimism about Western civilization and [...] rising conservatism." James A. Leith wrote that Gay glossed over aspects of Enlightenment philosophers that undermine his argument about their liberal attitudes, including anti-semitism and a willingness to suppress religious freedoms.
