= Marshall Berman =

American philosopher and Marxist humanist writer

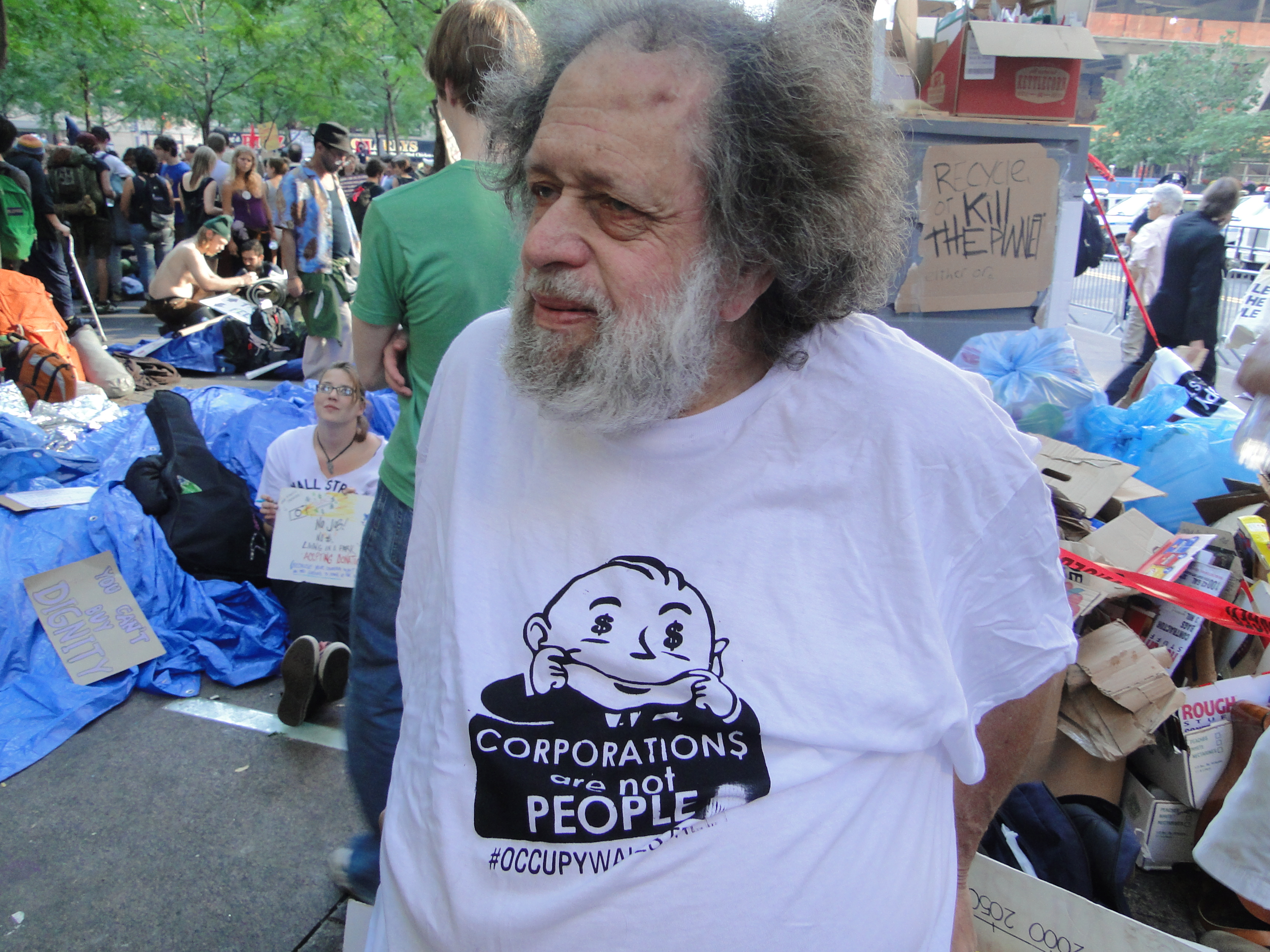
- Berman at Occupy Wall Street in 2011
- Born: Marshall Howard Berman; November 24, 1940; New York City, U.S.
- Died: September 11, 2013 (aged 72); New York City, U.S.
- Spouses: Shellie Sclan; Meredith Tax

Academic background
- Education: Columbia University; University of Oxford; Harvard University
- Thesis: The Politics of Authenticity: Self, State and Society in a Pre-Revolutionary Age: Studies in Montesquieu and Rousseau (1968)
- Academic advisor: Isaiah Berlin

Academic work
- Discipline: Philosophy; political science
- Sub-discipline: Political philosophy; urbanism
- School or tradition: Marxist humanism; Western Marxism
- Institutions: City College of New York
- Notable works: All That Is Solid Melts into Air (1982)
- Notable ideas: Phases of modernity

Marshall Howard Berman (Note: Pronounced /ˈbɜːrmən/.) (November 24, 1940 – September 11, 2013) was an American philosopher and Marxist humanist writer. He was a Distinguished Professor of Political Science at the City College of New York and at the Graduate Center of the City University of New York, teaching political philosophy and urbanism.

== Life and work ==
Marshall Berman was born in New York City on November 24, 1940, and spent his childhood in the neighborhood of Claremont, then a predominately Jewish neighborhood of the South Bronx. His parents Betty and Murray Berman (both children of Jewish Eastern European immigrants) owned the Betmar Tag and Label Company. His father died of a heart attack at age 48 in the autumn of 1955, shortly after the family had moved to the Kingsbridge neighborhood of the Bronx. Berman attended the Bronx High School of Science, and was an alumnus of Columbia University, receiving a Bachelor of Letters at the University of Oxford where he was a student of Sir Isaiah Berlin. Berman completed his Doctor of Philosophy degree at Harvard University in 1968. He began working at City College in 1968 where he taught until his death. He was on the editorial board of Dissent and a regular contributor to The Nation, The New York Times Book Review, and the Village Voice.

In Adventures in Marxism, Berman tells of how, while a Columbia University student in 1959, the chance discovery of Karl Marx's Economic and Philosophic Manuscripts of 1844 proved a revelation and inspiration, and became the foundation for all his future work. This personal tone pervades his work, linking historical trends with individual observations and inflections from a particular situation. Berman is best known for his book All That Is Solid Melts into Air. Some of his other books include The Politics of Authenticity, Adventures in Marxism, On the Town: A Hundred Years of Spectacle in Times Square (2006). His final publication was the "Introduction" to the Penguin Classics edition of The Communist Manifesto. Also in the 2000s, Berman co-edited (with Brian Berger) an anthology, New York Calling: From Blackout To Bloomberg, for which he wrote the introductory essay. Berman also was a participant in Ric Burns' landmark eight-part documentary titled New York.

He died on September 11, 2013, of a heart attack. According to friend and fellow author Todd Gitlin, Berman suffered the heart attack while eating at one of his favorite Upper West Side restaurants, the Metro Diner.

== Modernity and modernism ==
During the mid- to late 20th century, philosophical discourse focused on issues of modernity and the cultural attitudes and philosophies towards the modern condition. Berman put forward his own definition of modernism to counter postmodern philosophies:

Others believe that the really distinctive forms of contemporary art and thought have made a quantum leap beyond all the diverse sensibilities of modernism, and earned the right to call themselves "post-modern". I want to respond to these antithetical but complementary claims by reviewing the vision of modernity with which this book began. To be modern, I said, is to experience personal and social life as a maelstrom, to find one's world and oneself in perpetual disintegration and renewal, trouble and anguish, ambiguity and contradiction: to be part of a universe in which all that is solid melts into air. To be a modernist is to make oneself somehow at home in the maelstrom, to make its rhythms one's own, to move within its currents in search of the forms of reality, of beauty, of freedom, of justice, that its fervid and perilous flow allows.

Berman's view of modernism is at odds with postmodernism. Paraphrasing Charles Baudelaire, Michel Foucault defined the attitude of modernity as "the ironic heroization of the present." Berman viewed postmodernism as a soulless and hopeless echo chamber. He addressed this specifically in his Preface to the 1988 reprint of All That Is Solid Melts Into Air:

Post-modernists may be said to have developed a paradigm that clashes sharply with the one in this book. I have argued that modern life and art and thought have the capacity for perpetual self-critique and self-renewal. Post-modernists maintain that the horizon of modernity is closed, its energies exhausted—in effect, that modernity is passé. Post-modernist social thought pours scorn on all the collective hopes for moral and social progress, for personal freedom and public happiness, that were bequeathed to us by the modernists of the eighteenth-century Enlightenment. These hopes, post moderns say, have been shown to be bankrupt, at best vain and futile fantasies

Berman's view of modernism also conflicts with anti-modernism according to critic George Scialabba, who is persuaded by Berman's critique of postmodernism but finds the challenge posed by the anti-modernists to be more problematic. Scialabba admires Berman's stance as a writer and thinker, calling him "earnest and a democrat", and capable of withstanding the anti-modernist challenge as it has been posed by the likes of Christopher Lasch and Jackson Lears. But Scialabba also believes that Berman "never fully faces up to the possibility of nihilism."

== Bibliography ==
- The Politics of Authenticity: Radical Individualism and the Emergence of Modern Society (1970)
- All That Is Solid Melts into Air: The Experience of Modernity (1982)
- Adventures in Marxism (1999)
- On the Town: One Hundred Years of Spectacle in Times Square (2006)
- New York Calling (2007)
- Modernism in the Streets: A Life and Times in Essays (2017)

== See also ==
- American philosophy
- Faustian
- Modernity § Phases
- Praxis School
