= Modernism: The Lure of Heresy =

2007 book by Peter Gay

- Cover of the first edition
- Author: Peter Gay
- Language: English
- Subject: Modernism
- Publisher: Random House
- Publication date: 2007
- Publication place: United States
- Media type: Print (Hardcover and Paperback)
- Pages: 640
- ISBN: 978-0393333961

Modernism: The Lure of Heresy is a 2007 book about Modernism by Peter Gay.

== Summary ==
Gay discusses the history and development of Modernism, considering a broad range of different art-forms (including literature, painting, architecture, music, cinema and sculpture). He examines a mode of cultural creation which is itself highly contentious, dynamic and resistant to precise definition, exploring how it was generated in different fields and how it developed from around the 1840s (specifically the era of Gustave Flaubert and Charles Baudelaire) up to the era of a figure such as Andy Warhol.

Gay's work is influenced by his previous publications, for example his discussion of the Age of Enlightenment or Sigmund Freud, the founder of psychoanalysis. In particular, he views Modernism through the lens of Freudianism, particularly given Freud's emphasis on the prevalent conflicts between contradictory desires in human life; Gay sees this as crucial within the context of Modernism, particularly whenever culture is in a state of battle with the "aesthetic establishment." Gay's definition of Modernism pivots on two considerations: firstly, that desire to challenge pre-existing orthodoxies (encapsulated by the dictum 'make it new' of Ezra Pound) which leads to the use of the word 'heresy' in the title of the book. Secondly he isolates it to the desire to provide ever deeper portraits of the psychological realities and subjective experiences of human life, encompassing a wide range of manifestations such as the interior monologue of a writer such as James Joyce or the self-portraits of Max Beckmann. Furthermore, Gay challenges the oft-repeated idea that Modernism was a fundamentally elitist development and one that was not in harmony with the middle-classes.

Pound's 'make it new' was only one of the many eye-catching slogans and clarion-calls of Modernism, with others including 'Ornament Is Crime', 'Form follows Function', art being made to be "useless and impossible to justify" or Pablo Picasso's idea that modern art was a "sum of destructions" - many of these slogans have that 'heretical' or revolutionary element to them that forms a central part of the Gay thesis. A final aspect of his analytical framework involves his view that Modernism was challenged by the rise of movements such as Pop art and Conceptualism in the 1960s. Gay also explores whether or not there might be a contemporary resurgence of the Modernist impulse.

== Reception ==
Writing in The Washington Post, Michael Dirda said:

Like a good comparatist, Gay casts a wide net, covering Northern masters such as the Scandinavians August Strindberg and Edvard Munch, along with less familiar figures, such as the Russian Vladimir Tatlin and the German Georg Kaiser
