= Peter Gay =

German-American historian and author (1923–2015)

- Gay in 2007
- Born: Peter Joachim Fröhlich; June 20, 1923; Berlin, Germany
- Died: May 12, 2015 (aged 91); New York City, U.S.
- Spouse: Ruth Slotkin (m. 1959; died 2006)
- Awards: The A.H. Heineken Prizes; AHA's Award for Scholarly Distinction

Academic background
- Education: University of Denver (BA); Columbia University (MA, PhD)

Peter Joachim Gay (né Fröhlich German: [ˈfʁøːlɪç]; June 20, 1923 – May 12, 2015) was a German-American historian, educator, and author. He was a Sterling Professor of History at Yale University and former director of the New York Public Library's Center for Scholars and Writers (1997–2003). He received the American Historical Association's (AHA) Award for Scholarly Distinction in 2004. He authored over 25 books, including The Enlightenment: An Interpretation (The Rise of Modern Paganism); Weimar Culture: The Outsider as Insider (1968); and the widely translated Freud: A Life for Our Time (1988).

Gay was born in Berlin in 1923, left Germany in 1939 and emigrated, via Cuba, to the United States in 1941. From 1948 to 1955 he was a political science professor at Columbia University, and then a history professor from 1955 to 1969. He left Columbia in 1969 to join Yale University's History Department as Professor of Comparative and Intellectual European History and was named Sterling Professor of History in 1984.

Gay was the interim editor of The American Scholar after the death of Hiram Haydn in 1973 and served on that magazine's editorial board for many years. Sander L. Gilman, a literary historian at Emory University, called Gay "one of the major American historians of European thought, period".

== Early life and education ==
Born to a Jewish family in Berlin, Gay was educated as a child at Berlin's Goethe-Gymnasium. He and his family fled Nazi Germany in 1939, when he was 15 years old. Their original ticket was on the MS St. Louis, whose passengers were eventually turned away and forced to return to Europe, but they fortuitously changed their booking to the SS Iberia, which left two weeks earlier. Gay arrived in the United States in 1941, took American citizenship in 1946, and changed his name from Fröhlich (German for "merry" or "cheerful") to Gay (an English calque).

Gay attended the University of Denver, where he received his B.A. in 1946, and Columbia University, where he received his M.A. in 1947 and his Ph.D. in 1951. Gay taught political science at Columbia between 1948 and 1955 and history from 1955 to 1969. He taught at Yale University from 1969 until his retirement in 1993.

== Career ==
=== Scholarship ===
According to the American Historical Association's Award Citation, Gay's range of "scholarly achievements is truly remarkable". The New York Times described him in 2007 as "the country's pre-eminent cultural historian".

Gay's 1959 book, Voltaire's Politics: The Poet as Realist, examined Voltaire as a politician and how his politics influenced the ideas that Voltaire championed in his writings. Accompanying Voltaire's Politics was Gay's collection of essays, The Party of Humanity: Essays in the French Enlightenment (1964).

Gay followed the success of Voltaire's Politics with a two-volume history of the Enlightenment, The Enlightenment: An Interpretation (1966, 1969, 1973), whose first volume won the 1967 U.S. National Book Award in History and Biography. Annelien de Dijn argues that Gay, in The Enlightenment, first formulated the interpretation that the Enlightenment brought political modernization to the West, in terms of introducing democratic values and institutions and the creation of modern, liberal democracies. Although the thesis has many critics, it has been widely accepted by Anglophone scholars and has been reinforced by the large-scale studies done by Robert Darnton (Pirating and Publishing: The Book Trade in the Age of Enlightenment), Roy Porter (The Creation of the Modern World: The Untold story of the British Enlightenment), and Jonathan Israel (Radical Enlightenment: Philosophy and the Making of Modernity, 1650–1750).

Gay's 1968 book, Weimar Culture, examined the artistic, literary, and musical cultural history of the Weimar Republic.

Gay's 2007 book Modernism: The Lure of Heresy discussed the modernist movement in the arts from the 1840s to the 1960s, from its beginnings in Paris to its spread to Berlin and New York City, ending with its death in the pop art movement of the 1960s.

=== Focus on Freud ===
Gay was also a champion of psychohistory and an admirer of Sigmund Freud. In 1988, he published a biography of Freud, Freud: A Life for Our Time. Starting in 1978 with Freud, Jews and Other Germans, an examination of the impact of Freudian ideas on German culture, his writing demonstrated an increasing interest in psychology. Many of his works focused on the social impact of psychoanalysis. For example, in A Godless Jew: Freud, Atheism, and the Making of Psychoanalysis, he linked Freud's atheism to his development of psychoanalysis as a field.

Gay also wrote history books applying Freud's theories to history, such as the 5-volume The Bourgeois Experience: From Victoria to Freud. He edited a collection of Freud's writings called The Freud Reader. His writing was generally favorable, though occasionally critical, toward Freud's school of thought.

In September 1981, Harper's Magazine published a review of Freud's The Interpretation of Dreams that Gay falsely claimed to have discovered in "an obscure Austrian medical journal" from July 1900, but had in fact written himself. Gay later claimed that "the whole thing was lighthearted — nothing but a joke". Other historians, including Frederick Crews, saw it as an "apparent fraud", because Gay did not initially make a public statement after scholars took the review seriously, with Freud historian Peter J. Swales citing it in his scholarly work.

== Personal life and death ==
Gay married Ruth Slotkin (1922–2006) in 1959 and had three stepdaughters.

Gay died at his home in Manhattan on May 12, 2015, at the age of 91.

== Awards and honors ==
Gay received numerous awards for his scholarship, including the National Book Award in History and Biography for The Rise of Modern Paganism (1967), the first volume of The Enlightenment; the first Amsterdam Prize for Historical Science from The Hague, 1990; and the Gold Medal of the American Academy of Arts and Letters, 1992.

Gay held an ACLS Fellowship in 1959–1960. He was a Guggenheim Fellow in 1967–1968 and 1978–1979; a visiting fellow at the Institute for Advanced Study in Berlin, Germany; and an Overseas Fellow of Churchill College University from 1970 to 1971. He was elected to the American Philosophical Society in 1987.

In 1988, he was honored by The New York Public Library as a Library Lion. The following year, he was elected to the American Academy and Institute of Arts and Letters. He was recognized with several honorary doctorates.

- Guggenheim Fellowship 1966
- National Book Award, 1967
- New York Public Library, Library Lion, 1988
- American Academy and Institute of Arts and Letters, 1989
- Royal Netherlands Academy of Arts and Sciences Award for Historical Science, The A.H. Heineken Prize, 1990
- American Academy of Arts and Letters Gold Medal in History, 1992
- Geschwister-Scholl-Preis (Munich, 1999)
- American Historical Association Award for Scholarly Distinction, 2004

== Works ==
=== Author ===
- The Dilemma of Democratic Socialism: Eduard Bernstein's Challenge to Marx, 1952.
- Voltaire's Politics: The Poet as Realist, 1959.
- The Party of Humanity: Essays in the French Enlightenment, 1964.
- The Enlightenment: An Interpretation: The Rise of Modern Paganism, 1966 — winner of the National Book Award. Reissued 1995.
- The Loss of Mastery: Puritan Historians in Colonial America, 1966.
- Weimar Culture: The Outsider as Insider, 1968.
- The Enlightenment: An Interpretation: The Science of Freedom, 1969. Reissued 1995.
- The Bridge of Criticism: Dialogues on the Enlightenment, 1970.
- Modern Europe to 1815, co-written with Robert Kiefer Webb, 1973.
- Style in History, 1974.
- Art and Act: On Causes in History: Manet, Gropius, Mondrian, 1976.
- Freud, Jews and Other Germans: Masters and Victims in Modernist Culture, 1978.
- The Bourgeois Experience: Victoria to Freud, 5 vols., 1984–1998:
  - The Education of the Senses (1984)
  - The Tender Passion (1986)
  - The Cultivation of Hatred (1993)
  - The Naked Heart (1995)
  - Pleasure Wars (1998)
- Freud for Historians, 1985.
- A Godless Jew: Freud, Atheism, and the Making of Psychoanalysis, 1987.
- Freud: A Life for Our Time, 1988 — finalist for the National Book Award for Nonfiction.
- Reading Freud: Explorations & Entertainments, 1990.
- Sigmund Freud and Art: His Personal Collection of Antiquities, 1993.
- My German Question: Growing Up in Nazi Berlin, 1998 (autobiography).
- Mozart, 1999.
- Schnitzler's Century: The Making of Middle-Class Culture 1815–1914, 2002.
- Savage Reprisals: Bleak House, Madame Bovary, Buddenbrooks, 2002.
- Modernism: The Lure of Heresy: from Baudelaire to Beckett and Beyond, 2007.
- Why the Romantics Matter, 2015.

=== Editor ===
- Deism: An Anthology, 1968.
- The Enlightenment; A Comprehensive Anthology, 1973.
- Historians at Work – 4 vols., 1972–1975.
- The Freud Reader, 1989.

=== Essays ===
- "Rhetoric and Politics in the French Revolution," The American Historical Review Vol. 66, No. 3, April 1961
- "An Age of Crisis: A Critical View," The Journal of Modern History Vol. 33, No. 2, June 1961
