= Samuel Moore (translator) =

English translator (1838–1911)

Samuel Moore (1 December 1838 – 20 July 1911) was an English translator, lawyer and colonial administrator. He is best known for the first English translation of Das Kapital and the only authorised translation of The Communist Manifesto which was thoroughly verified and supplied with footnotes by Friedrich Engels. Moore also wrote a summary of a notebook by Karl Marx which was published as Chapter III of the third volume of Das Kapital.

Born in Bamford, Moore was for many years a friend of Marx and Engels and their advisor in mathematics, which he had studied at Trinity College, Cambridge.
