= Anti-modernization =

Sociological term

Anti-modernization (also known as anti-modernisation or retraditionalisation), is "a societal and cultural reaction to the unsolved 'reality problems' in the modernization model".

== Background ==
This mostly refers to an abstract concept or mode of thought characterized by supposedly "non-western," or "less privileged" nations and/or people in those nations antipathy or opposition to movements that attempt to have those nations become more "western." This could include disfavor of movements attempting to spread democracy, capitalism, or certain themes of social life present in more "western" nations or cultures.

Boris Rumer wrote in his book Central Asia at the End of the Transition (2005) that "anti-modernization is appearing in all spheres of culture and economics. The retraditionalization of social life, deprofessionalization of entire strata of the population, the anti-intellectualism emanating from above, the exodus of skilled personnel from the country – these are all clear signs of the anti-modernization that characterizes the reality in post-Soviet Uzbekistan". This constitutes an example of how some people in certain places view movements of modernization. People(s) involved with the anti-modernization movement sometimes perceive that western societies live in a culture that leads its people to be dominated by the people above them either economically or politically. This can be seen as severely negative and as representative of oppression.

== Examples through history ==
There was an apparent anti-modernization movement in Iran in the 1960s and 1970s was said to be "an attempt to reconcile...modernity with the Islamic and Iranian contexts".

There was an anticientificismo trend starting in Argentina c. 1962 that seemed to object to how their science was developing.

== See also ==
- Gharbzadegi
- Occidentalism
