= Johann Ludwig Karl Heinrich von Struve =

Johann Ludwig Karl Heinrich von Struve (August 9, 1812 – March 3, 1898) was the youngest son of the large brood of children of Johann Christoph Gustav von Struve and Sibilla Christiane Friederike von Hochstetter; part of the Struve family and brother to Gustav Struve.

== Early life ==
Struve was born in Stuttgart, in what was the Kingdom of Württemberg, during the short-lived Confederation of the Rhine.

Like his siblings before him, he attended the Gymnasium and Polytechnic schools in Stuttgart, before attending law school, which he did not finish, having been bitten by wanderlust before his final exams. He then joined and traveled to the province of Silesia, as a member of the Prussian military.

It was there that he met his first wife, Stephanie von Borowsky, the daughter of the local nobleman J. von Borowsky, and on September 19, 1836, they were married at the Borowsky estate at Posen.

Struve and Stephanie farmed land in Froeschen which Struve had bought from Borowsky, and there they had four children, including one who died shortly after birth:

- Friedrich Wilhelm Amand von Struve (1838–1902)
- Louis Joseph von Struve (1839–1921)
- Sibilla "Silly" von Struve (born 1840–1841)

Stephanie died shortly after the fourth child died at birth.

== Life in Berlin ==
von Struve then traveled to Berlin and there he married his cousin, Wilhelmine Charlotte Margarete "Minna" von Hochstetter on September 19, 1844.

With Minna and his young family, he went back to his land holdings in the east and another daughter came, Stephanie von Struve, born 1847 in Chobanin, Kingdom of Poland.

Shortly thereafter the German Revolution of 1848 began, and Heinrich's brother, Gustav Struve, who was a leading component of such, caused the Struve name to be less than honorable for the times and created an environment less than hospitable for Heinrich von Struve and his family, as he too had supported the democratic cause. Like many of his German countrymen, he decided the only solution was to emigrate. He chose Texas, in the United States, as destination.

== Immigration to the United States ==
On September 19, 1848, Heinrich von Struve and his family emigrated from the port of Hamburg to Galveston, Texas, landing there on November 22, 1848. From there they went by ox-cart to Fayette County, Texas, ultimately settling between the Rutersville township and the town of Fayetteville in eastern Fayette County.

In Texas the last four children were born to Heinrich and Minna von Struve:

- Konrad von Struve (1849–1923) - who later was an engineer in Rio de Janeiro, Brazil, and married his cousin Philippine von Manuel.
- Alexandrine Albertine "Fanny" von Struve (1853–1917) - who later was married to a Scots relation of the St. Clairs and lived for a time in Edinburgh, Scotland, where she ran a finishing school, and then moved her school to Leipzig.
- Sophie von Struve (1857–1909)
- Elisabeth Pauline Luise "Amy" von Struve (1858–1911) - who later married Julius Karl Betzler and was a missionary in India for a time.

von Struve was quite active in his adopted homeland of Texas, serving as a postmaster, a cigar-maker, a farmer and rancher and a land speculator. He enjoyed the frontier life. However, his wife, Minna, did not and just prior to the American Civil War, he sent his family back to Europe.

== World traveling ==
His two older sons, Amand and Louis, remained in Texas. The former, Amand, marrying Christiane Otilie Pfeisler and residing in Burnet County and later in Blanco County. The latter, Louis, marrying Clementine de Lassaulx, the daughter of Otto Phillip de Lassaulx of Koblenz and Elberfeld and his wife Margaretha Fassbender of Trier, and granddaughter of the noted royal Prussian architect Johann Claudius von Lassaulx (also known as J.C. de Lassaulx), and residing the remainder of his life in Fayette County, Texas.

Heinrich von Struve, like his wife and younger children, returned to Europe from Texas by way of New York, where he visited his brother Gustav Struve, who also had emigrated to America after the 1848 Revolution with his wife, Amalie. He assisted his brother in marketing Gustav's "Weltgeschichte" or World History, which Gustav had written after his arrival in America.

Heinrich von Struve came back to Texas several times thereafter to visit his sons, as well as traveled to Brazil, where his youngest son, Konrad had gone as an engineer. In Brazil he had an audience with the Brazilian Emperor, Dom Pedro II, where he regaled the monarch with his tales of the Texas Wilderness.

When finally he returned and remained in Europe, Heinrich put his life story to paper and published it in 1895 as a "Lebensbild". He died March 3, 1898, in Rothenburg ob der Tauber, Germany.

== Sources ==
- Heinrich von Struve: Ein Lebensbild. Erinnerungen aus dem Leben eines Zweiundachtzigjährigen in der alten und neuen Welt, Leipzig, Verlag von E. Ungleich, 1895 (1st edition 1896).
- Heinrich von Struve: Ein Lebensbild. Erinnerungen aus dem Leben eines Zweiundachtzigjährigen in der alten und neuen Welt, Leipzig, Verlag von E. Ungleich, 1896 (2nd enlarged edition in 1896).
- Heinrich von Struve: Ein Lebensbild. Erinnerungen aus dem Leben eines Zweiundachtzigjährigen in der alten und neuen Welt, Emmishofen (Schweiz), Verlag von Carl Hirsch, 1924 (3rd edition 1924).
- Arno Struve: The Struve Family in Europe and in Texas, Abernathy, self-published, 1979
- Jon Todd Koenig: The Struve Family in Texas: the descendants of Heinrich von Struve (1812-1898) of Fayette County, Texas, USA, Houston, self-published, 2006

Struve family tree

Jacob (1755–1841); Mathematician	Anton Sebastian
Carl (1785–1838); Philologist	Ernst (1786–1822)	Gustav (1788–1829)	Friedrich Georg; Wilhelm (1793–1864); Astronomer	Ludwig (1795–1828); Anatomist	Johann Christoph Gustav (1763–1828); Diplomat
Otto Wilhelm (1819–1905); Astronomer	Heinrich (1822–1908); Chemist	Berngard (1827–1889); Russian governor	Karl (1835–1907); Politician	Johann Ludwig (1812–1898)	Gustav (1805–1870); Politician
Karl Hermann (1854–1920); Astronomer	Gustav Ludwig (1858–1920); Astronomer	Vasily Berngardovich (1854–1912); Mathematician	Peter Berngardovich (1870–1944); Revolutionary	Alexander; Berngardovich
Georg Hermann (1886–1933); Astronomer	Otto (1897–1963); Astronomer	Vasily Vasilevich (1889–1965); Historian	Gleb (1898–1985); Poet	Aleksey (1899–1976); Library founder
Wilfried (1914–1992); Astronomer	Nikita Alexeyevich (1931–2016); Author
