= Johann Christoph Gustav von Struve =

German diplomat (1763–1828)

Johann Christoph Gustav von Struve was a German diplomat. He was born on 26 September 1763 in Regensburg (at this time a Free Imperial City) to the diplomat Anton Sebastian von Struve, the Russian Empire ambassador to the Reichstag in Regensburg. His mother was Johanne Dorothea Werner of Sondershausen in the Thuringian states.

Gustav, as he was known, was a signer to the Treaty of Paris of 1814.

== Other Struves ==
Gustav came from a distinguished family, with many of his siblings also being civil servants to the Russian court, in the tradition of their father, Anton:

- Catharina Elisabetha von Struve (1759–1838)
- Johann Georg von Struve (1766–1831)
- Johann Christian von Struve (1768–1812) – Served as Qualified Civil Servant in the Russian Foreign Office in Saint Petersburg
- August Wilhelm von Struve (1770–1838) – Served as Qualified Civil Servant in the Russian Postal Department in Saint Petersburg
- Heinrich Christoph Gottfried von Struve (1772–1851) – Served as Qualified Civil Servant in the Russian Embassy in Stuttgart
- Philippine Rosina Elisabetha von Struve (1775–1819) – Married Franz Ferdinand von Gruen, Chancellor to the Prince of Reuss
- Albrecht von Struve(1774–1794)

== Family of Gustav and Sibilla ==
In Stuttgart on 18 May 1793, Gustav married Sibilla Christiane Friederike von Hochstetter, the daughter of the noted German political leader, Johann Amand Andreas von Hochstetter and Elisabeth Friederike von Buehler.

They had eleven known children:

- Albrecht von Struve (1793–1794)
- Elise von Struve (1795–1844)
- Karl Anton von Struve (1797–1846) – Married St. Claire Stuart Trotter in Edinburgh
- Amand von Struve (1798–1867) – Married Karoline von Kahlenberg
- Sophie von Struve (1801–1864) – Married Karl von Manuel
- Georg Heinrich Christoph Franz von Struve (1802–1886) – Married Eugenie Josephene Charlotte von Witte
- Katharina "Katinka" von Struve (1803–1855)
- Gustav von Struve (1805–1870) – Married Elise Ferdinande Amalie Dusar, and was later involved in the 1848 Revolutions.
- Friederike von Struve (1807–1890) – Married Joseph von Gemmingen
- Philippine von Struve (1809–1906)
- Johann Ludwig Karl Heinrich von Struve (1812–1898) – Married Stephanie von Borowsky and then later his cousin, Wilhelmine Charlotte Margarete "Minna" von Hochstetter

Gustav died on 6 May 1828 in Karlsruhe, Grand Duchy of Baden, during the early days of the German Confederation.

Struve family tree

Jacob (1755–1841); Mathematician	Anton Sebastian
Carl (1785–1838); Philologist	Ernst (1786–1822)	Gustav (1788–1829)	Friedrich Georg; Wilhelm (1793–1864); Astronomer	Ludwig (1795–1828); Anatomist	Johann Christoph Gustav (1763–1828); Diplomat
Otto Wilhelm (1819–1905); Astronomer	Heinrich (1822–1908); Chemist	Berngard (1827–1889); Russian governor	Karl (1835–1907); Politician	Johann Ludwig (1812–1898)	Gustav (1805–1870); Politician
Karl Hermann (1854–1920); Astronomer	Gustav Ludwig (1858–1920); Astronomer	Vasily Berngardovich (1854–1912); Mathematician	Peter Berngardovich (1870–1944); Revolutionary	Alexander; Berngardovich
Georg Hermann (1886–1933); Astronomer	Otto (1897–1963); Astronomer	Vasily Vasilevich (1889–1965); Historian	Gleb (1898–1985); Poet	Aleksey (1899–1976); Library founder
Wilfried (1914–1992); Astronomer	Nikita Alexeyevich (1931–2016); Author
