= Ludwig von Struve =

Baltic German astronomer (1858–1920)

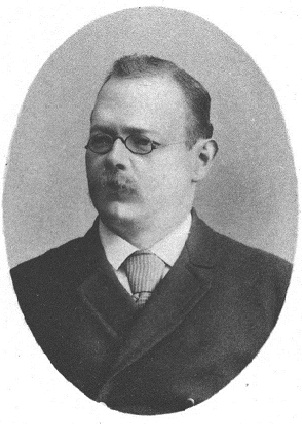
- Struve in 1901.
- Born: 1 November 1858; Tsarskoye Selo, Russian Empire
- Died: 4 November 1920 (aged 62); Simferopol, RSFSR
- Other names: Lyudvig Ottovich Struve; Lyudvig Ottonovich Struve
- Education: Imperial University of Dorpat
- Known for: Astronomy, geodesy, director of Kharkiv Observatory
- Parent: Otto Wilhelm von Struve (father)
- Relatives: Friedrich Georg Wilhelm von Struve (grandfather); Hermann Struve (brother); Otto Struve (son)

Gustav Wilhelm Ludwig von Struve (1 November 1858 – 4 November 1920) was a Baltic German astronomer, part of the famous Baltic German Struve family. In Russian, his name is sometimes given as Lyudvig Ottovich Struve (Людвиг Оттович Струве) or Lyudvig Ottonovich Struve (Людвиг Оттонович Струве).

== Biography ==
Gustav Wilhelm Ludwig von Struve was born in 1858 in Tsarskoye Selo – a former Russian residence of the imperial family and visiting nobility, located 26 kilometers (16 mi) south from the center of St. Petersburg. He was the fourth son of Otto Wilhelm von Struve and Emilie Dyrssen (1823–1868) and a younger brother of astronomer Hermann Struve. Ludwig followed his family traditions and between 1876 and 1880 studied astronomy at the Imperial University of Dorpat. For his post-graduate research started at the Pulkovo Observatory which was headed by his father. In 1883, Ludwig defended his PhD thesis on "Resultate aus den in Pulkowa angestellen Vergleichungen von Procyon mit benachbarten Sternen" (Results obtained in Pulkovo on relation of Procyon with the neighboring stars). Between 1883 and 1886, Struve was staying abroad in several European observatories, including those in Bonn, Milan, Paris and Leipzig. His major influences in astronomy were his father and the Italian astronomer Giovanni Schiaparelli. Between 1886 and 1894, Struve worked as an astronomer at the Tartu Observatory. In 1887, using results obtained during his European trip, he prepared and defended the habilitation thesis titled "Neue Bestimmung der Constante der Precession und der eigenen Bewegung des Sonnensystems" (New determination of the constant of precession and of the motion of the Solar System).

== Research ==
A few years after retirement of his father, in 1894, Ludwig moved to the University of Kharkiv. There, in 1897 he became professor in astronomy and geodesy and director of the observatory. Prior to Struve, the Kharkiv Observatory was not registered within the Russian leveling network and the altitude of Kharkiv was based on rather inaccurate trigonometric leveling conducted by local triangulation. It took Struve five years of hard work to include the observatory to the Russian leveling network. In 1912, he was elected as Dean of the Physics and Mathematics Department of Kharkiv University. In 1914, he founded a workshop of fine mechanics at the department and headed it for five years. Prior to that, such institutions had been nonexistent in Russia, and foreign engineers were personally invited for precision mechanical work. Struve attempted to build a national school in this area, but with limited success. He himself was a skilled engineer and constructed an instrument for the measurement of "an individual error using artificial star.” This device was invented by H. G. van de Sande Bakhuyzen at the Leiden Observatory and was actively used by Struve.

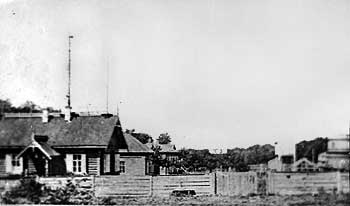
Kharkiv Observatory in 1914.

Struve's research was first focused on celestial mechanics, in particular precession and other motion within the Solar System. It then expanded on the study of the positions and motion of stars, in particular single and double stars lying within the angular range of the Tartu Observatory. He used occultation of stars by the Moon to refine the value of the lunar radius. He also determined the apex coordinates of the Sun's movement and was one of the first astronomers to estimate, in 1887, the rotation rate of the Milky Way.

On the basis of his observations in Kharkiv, Struve compiled a catalogue "Observation of 779 zodiac stars” (1898–1902). Between 1908 and 1915, Struve with collaborators determined right ascension and declination of 1407 circumpolar stars, taking about 11,000 observations for each coordinate. The results were published in the "Kharkiv differential catalogue of declination of 1407 circumpolar stars in FK4 system for mean epoch of 1911 year" and "The results of a comparison of the catalogue of declination of 1407 circumpolar stars and the Fabritius catalogue with the tables of proper motion of 412 circumpolar stars".

== Late years ==
Struve was married to Elizaveta Khrystoforovna (1874–1964) and they had two sons and two daughters. Their first child, son Otto, was born in Kharkiv in 1897, and later became one of the most famous astronomers of the 20th century. Otto served as a White Russian officer in the losing side of the civil war that followed the Russian Revolution. Therefore, to avoid Bolshevik's repressions, Struve had to move in 1919 to Simferopol where he had assumed professor position at the Tavrida University. He left in Kharkiv a collection of about 1400 historical letters involving his father and grandfather, Friedrich Georg Wilhelm von Struve. The collection had survived two wars and was preserved till the present days.

After leaving Kharkiv, tragedy struck the Struve family with three deaths in the over the course of five months. In the summer of 1920, Ludwig's 9-year-old daughter Elizabeth drowned in front of him. Shortly afterward, his son Werner (1903–1920) died from tuberculosis, and in November, Ludwig himself died of a stroke. He was survived by his wife and daughter Yadviga (1901–1924), who returned to Kharkiv. Yadviga had taught German at Kharkiv Technology Institute, but died in 1924 of tuberculosis.

== Awards ==
In 1915, Struve received an award from the council of the Russian Astronomical Society, where he was a member from 1893. The award was given for his work “Elaboration of the observations of lunar occultation of the stars during the total lunar eclipse” that was carried within a collaboration between the Kharkiv and Pulkovo observatories.

== Citations and references ==
=== Cited sources ===
- "Струве, Людвиг Оттонович" . Brockhaus and Efron Encyclopedic Dictionary (in Russian). 1906.
- Balyshev, M.A. (2021). Ludwig von Struve (1858–1920): Development of Positional Astronomy at the Kharkiv Astronomical Observatory. Kinematics and Physics of Celestial Bodies, 37(5): 269-272.
- Balyshev, M.A. (2021). Astronomer Ludwig Ottovich Struve (1858-1920): A scientific biography. Science and Science of Science, 3: 76-102. (In Ukrainian)
- Balyshev M. (2007) Ludwig Ottonovich Struve. Notes historian. Universitates. Science and Enlightenment, 1. P.34-43.(In Russian)

Struve family tree

Jacob (1755–1841); Mathematician	Anton Sebastian
Carl (1785–1838); Philologist	Ernst (1786–1822)	Gustav (1788–1829)	Friedrich Georg; Wilhelm (1793–1864); Astronomer	Ludwig (1795–1828); Anatomist	Johann Christoph Gustav (1763–1828); Diplomat
Otto Wilhelm (1819–1905); Astronomer	Heinrich (1822–1908); Chemist	Berngard (1827–1889); Russian governor	Karl (1835–1907); Politician	Johann Ludwig (1812–1898)	Gustav (1805–1870); Politician
Karl Hermann (1854–1920); Astronomer	Gustav Ludwig (1858–1920); Astronomer	Vasily Berngardovich (1854–1912); Mathematician	Peter Berngardovich (1870–1944); Revolutionary	Alexander; Berngardovich
Georg Hermann (1886–1933); Astronomer	Otto (1897–1963); Astronomer	Vasily Vasilevich (1889–1965); Historian	Gleb (1898–1985); Poet	Aleksey (1899–1976); Library founder
Wilfried (1914–1992); Astronomer	Nikita Alexeyevich (1931–2016); Author
