= Peter Struve =

Russian political economist and philosopher (1870–1944)

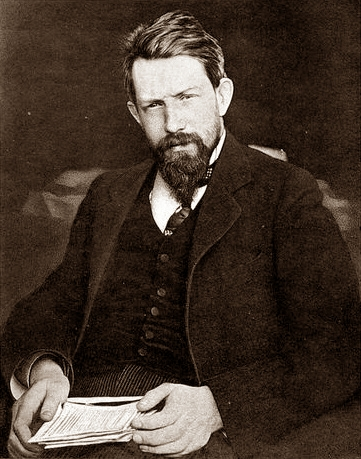
- Struve between 1890 and 1910
- Born: 7 February [O.S. 26 January] 1870; Perm, Russian Empire
- Died: 22 February 1944 (aged 74); Paris, German-occupied France

Education
- Education: Saint Petersburg State University

Philosophical work
- Era: Contemporary philosophy
- Region: Russian philosophy
- School: Marxism, nationalism, liberalism, conservative liberalism
- Main interests: Russian nationalism, All-Russian nation, pan-Slavism, Legal Marxism, anti-communism
- Notable ideas: Legal Marxism, Russian nationalism, anti-Sovietism

Peter (or Pyotr or Petr) Berngardovich Struve (Russian: Пётр Бернга́рдович Стру́ве, IPA: [pʲɵtr bʲɪrnˈɡardəvʲɪtɕˈstruvʲɪ]; 7 February [O.S. 26 January] 1870 – 22 February 1944) was a Russian political economist, philosopher, historian and editor. He started his career as a Marxist, later became a liberal and after the Bolshevik Revolution, joined the White movement. From 1920, he lived in exile in Paris, where he was a prominent critic of Russian communism.

== Biography ==
=== Marxist theoretician ===
Peter Struve is probably the best known member of the Russian branch of the Struve family. Son of Bernhard Struve (Astrakhan and later Perm governor) and grandson of astronomer Friedrich Georg Wilhelm von Struve, he entered the Natural Sciences Department of the University of Saint Petersburg in 1889 and transferred to its law school in 1890. While there, he became interested in Marxism, attended Marxist and narodniki (populist) meetings (where he met his future opponent Vladimir Lenin) and wrote articles for legally published magazines—hence the term Legal Marxism, whose chief proponent he became. In September 1893 Struve was hired by the Finance Ministry and worked in its library, but was fired on 1 June 1894 after an arrest and a brief detention in April–May of that year. In 1894, he also published his first major book, Kriticheskie zametki k voprosu ob ekonomicheskom razvitii Rossii (Critical Notes on the Economic Development of Russia) in which he defended the applicability of Marxism to Russian conditions against populist critics.

In 1895, Struve finished his degree and wrote an Open letter to Nicholas II on behalf of the Zemstvo. He then went abroad for further studies, where he attended the 1896 International Socialist Congress in London and befriended famous Russian revolutionary exile Vera Zasulich.

After returning to Russia Struve became one of the editors of the successive Legal Marxist magazines Novoye Slovo (The New Word, 1897), Nachalo (The Beginning, 1899) and Zhizn (1899–1901). Struve was also the most popular speaker at the Legal Marxist debates at the Free Economic Society in the late 1890s—early 1900s in spite of his often impenetrable-to-laymen arguments and unkempt appearance. In 1898 Struve wrote the Manifesto of the newly formed Russian Social Democratic Labour Party. However, as he later explained:

Socialism, to tell the truth, never aroused the slightest emotion in me, still less attraction... Socialism interested me mainly as an ideological force – which... could be directed either to the conquest of civil and political freedoms or against them

=== Leaving socialism ===
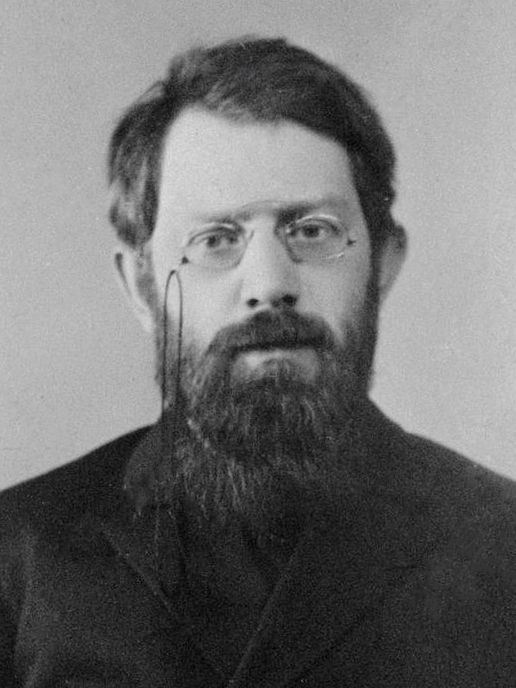
Struve as a member of State Duma

By 1900, Struve had become a leader of the revisionist wing of Russian Marxists. Struve and Mikhail Tugan-Baranovsky represented the moderates during the negotiations with Julius Martov, Alexander Potresov and Vladimir Lenin, the leaders of the party's radical wing, in Pskov in March 1900. In late 1900, Struve went to Munich and again held lengthy talks with the radicals between December 1900 and February 1901. The two sides eventually reached a compromise which included making Struve the editor of Sovremennoe Obozrenie (Contemporary Review), a proposed supplement to the radicals' magazine Zaria (Dawn), in exchange for his help in securing financial support from Russian liberals. The plan was frustrated by Struve's arrest at the famous Kazan Square demonstration on 4 March 1901 immediately upon his return to Russia. Struve was banished from the capital and, like other demonstrators, was offered to choose his own place of exile. He chose Tver, a center of Zemstvo radicalism.

In 1902 Struve secretly left Tver and went abroad, but by then the radicals had abandoned the idea of a joint magazine and Struve's further evolution from socialism to liberalism would have made collaboration difficult anyway. Instead he founded an independent liberal semi-monthly magazine Osvobozhdenie (Liberation) with the help of liberal intelligentsia and the radical part of Zemstvo. The magazine was financed by D. E. Zhukovsky and was at first published in Stuttgart, Germany (1 July 1902 – 15 October 1904). In mid-1903, after the founding of the liberal Soyuz Osvobozhdeniya (Union of Liberation), the magazine became the Union's official organ and was smuggled into Russia, where it enjoyed considerable success. When German police, under pressure from Okhrana, raided the premises in October 1904, Struve moved his operations to Paris and continued publishing the magazine for another year (15 October 1904 – 18 October 1905) until the October Manifesto proclaimed freedom of the press in Russia.

=== Liberal politician ===
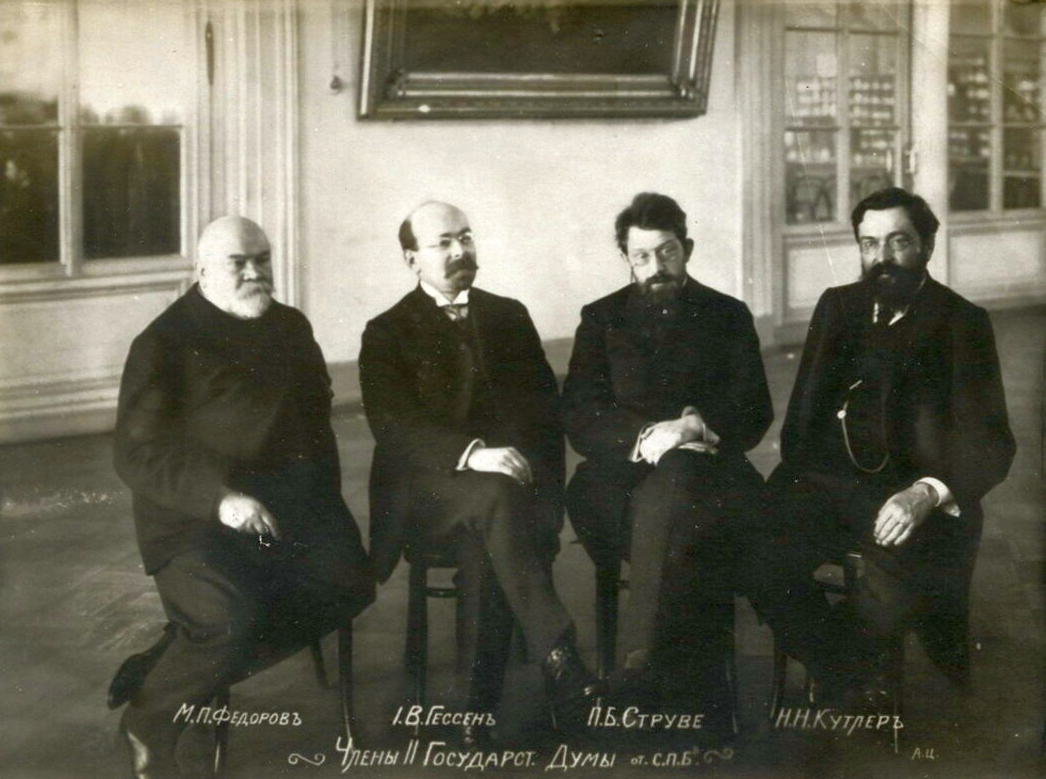
Struve, third from the left, and three other Kadet members of the Second Duma elected from St. Peterburg

In October 1905 Struve returned to Russia and became a co-founder of the liberal Constitutional Democratic party and a member of its Central Committee. In 1907 he represented the party in the Second State Duma.

After the Duma's dissolution on 3 June 1907, Struve concentrated on his work at Russkaya Mysl (Russian Thought), a leading liberal newspaper, of which he had been publisher and de facto editor-in-chief since 1906.

Struve was the driving force behind Vekhi (Milestones, 1909), a groundbreaking and controversial anthology of essays critical of the intelligentsia and its rationalistic and radical traditions. As Russkaya Mysl editor, Struve rejected Andrey Bely's seminal novel Petersburg, which he apparently saw as a parody of revolutionary intellectuals.

With the outbreak of World War I in 1914 Struve adopted a position of support for the government, and in 1916 he resigned from the Constitutional Democratic party's Central Committee over what he saw as the party's excessive opposition to the government in a time of war.

=== Opponent of Bolshevism ===
In May 1917, after the February Revolution of 1917 overthrew monarchy in Russia, Struve was elected as member of the Russian Academy of Sciences, until he was excluded by the Bolshevik-engineered expulsion of 1918.

Immediately after the October Revolution of 1917, Struve went to the South of Russia where he joined the Volunteer Army's Council.

In early 1918 he returned to Moscow, where he lived under an assumed name for most of the year, contributed to Iz Glubiny (variously translated as De Profundis, From the Deep or From the Depths, 1918), a follow-up to Vekhi, and published several other notable articles on the causes of the revolution.

With the Russian Civil War raging and his life in danger Struve had to flee; and after a three-month journey arrived in Finland, where he negotiated with general Nikolai Yudenich and the Finnish leader Carl Gustaf Emil Mannerheim before leaving for Western Europe. Struve represented general Anton Denikin's anti-Bolshevik government in Paris and London in 1919, before returning to Denikin-controlled territories in the South of Russia, where he edited a leading newspaper of the White Movement. With Denikin's resignation after the Novorossiysk debacle and general Pyotr Wrangel's rise to the top in early 1920, Struve became foreign minister in Wrangel's government.

With the defeat of Wrangel's army in November 1920 Struve left for Bulgaria, where he relaunched Russkaya Mysl under the aegis of the emigre "Russko-Bolgarskoe knigoizdatel'stvo" publishing house. Then Struve left for Paris, where he remained until his death in 1944. In Bulgaria, Struve left many followers in the field of economics, especially his students, who emigrated and took academic positions at Bulgarian universities (the most famous of which are Simeon Demostenov and Naum Dolinski).

His children were prominent in the Russian Orthodox Church Outside of Russia.

== Personal life ==
=== Religion ===
Struve's father was Russian Orthodox while his mother was Lutheran. During his Marxist years Struve was a religious skeptic. Afterwards, he returned to Orthodoxy, maintaining a strongly individualistic view that was close to Protestantism.

=== Descendants ===
Peter Struve's son Gleb Struve (1898–1985) was one of the most prominent Russian critics of the 20th century. He taught at the University of California, Berkeley and befriended Vladimir Nabokov in the 1920s.

Pyotr's grandson, Nikita Struve (1931–2016), was a professor at a Paris university and an editor of several Russian-language periodicals published in Europe.

== Legacy ==
Historian Bernard Pares said Struve was one Europe's most powerful thinkers. Harold Williams called him the greatest intellect he had ever met.

== Family tree ==
Struve family tree

Jacob (1755–1841); Mathematician	Anton Sebastian
Carl (1785–1838); Philologist	Ernst (1786–1822)	Gustav (1788–1829)	Friedrich Georg; Wilhelm (1793–1864); Astronomer	Ludwig (1795–1828); Anatomist	Johann Christoph Gustav (1763–1828); Diplomat
Otto Wilhelm (1819–1905); Astronomer	Heinrich (1822–1908); Chemist	Berngard (1827–1889); Russian governor	Karl (1835–1907); Politician	Johann Ludwig (1812–1898)	Gustav (1805–1870); Politician
Karl Hermann (1854–1920); Astronomer	Gustav Ludwig (1858–1920); Astronomer	Vasily Berngardovich (1854–1912); Mathematician	Peter Berngardovich (1870–1944); Revolutionary	Alexander; Berngardovich
Georg Hermann (1886–1933); Astronomer	Otto (1897–1963); Astronomer	Vasily Vasilevich (1889–1965); Historian	Gleb (1898–1985); Poet	Aleksey (1899–1976); Library founder
Wilfried (1914–1992); Astronomer	Nikita Alexeyevich (1931–2016); Author

== Works in English ==
- Collected Works in 15 volumes, ed. Richard Pipes, Ann Arbor, MI, University Microfilms, 1970
- "Past and present of Russian economics" in Russian realities & problems: Lectures delivered at Cambridge in August 1916, by Pavel Milyukov, Peter Struve, Harold Williams, Alexander Sergeyevich Lappo-Danilevsky and Roman Dmowski, Cambridge, University press, 1917, 229p.
- "Foreword", in Alexander A. Valentinov. The assault of heaven; the black book containing official and other information illustrating the struggle against all religion carried by the Communist government in Russia, [Berlin, M. Mattisson, ltd., printer, 1924], xxiv, 266p.
- Food Supply in Russia During the World War, Yale University Press, 1930, xxviii, 469p.
- Struve, Gleb. “From Peter Struve’s Unpublished Correspondence.” The Russian Review 8, no. 1 (1949): 62–69.

=== Articles ===
- “Russia.” The Slavonic Review 1, no. 1 (1922): 24–39.
- Struve, Peter, and B. P. “Ivan Aksakov.” The Slavonic Review 2, no. 6 (1924): 514–18.
- “Walter Scott and Russia.” The Slavonic and East European Review 11, no. 32 (1933): 397–410.
- “My Contacts with Rodichev.” The Slavonic and East European Review 12, no. 35 (1934): 347–67.
- “Prince A. D. Obolensky.” The Slavonic and East European Review 12, no. 35 (1934): 447–48.
- “My Contacts and Conflicts with Lenin: I.” The Slavonic and East European Review 12, no. 36 (1934): 573–95.
- “My Contacts and Conflicts with Lenin: II.” The Slavonic and East European Review 13, no. 37 (1934): 66–84.
- “Alexander Potresov.” The Slavonic and East European Review 13, no. 38 (1935): 434–35.
- “English Tissue-Printing in Russia: An Episode in Russian Economic History.” The Slavonic and East European Review 19, no. 53/54 (1939): 303–10.

== Works in Russian ==
- Sub'ektivism i idealizm (Subjectivism and Idealism), 1901, 267p.
- Na raznye temy (On Various Topics), 1902, 555p.
- Khozyaistvo i tsena (Enterprise and Price), in 2 volumes, 1913–1916.
- Itogi i suschestvo kommunisticheskago khozyaistva (The End Results and the Essence of the Communist Enterprise), [1921], 30p.
- Sotsial'naya i ekonomicheskaya istoriya Rossii (Social and Economic History of Russia), 1952, 386p.

== See also ==
- List of scholars in Russian law
- List of Russian legal historians
