= Hermann von Struve =

Baltic German astronomer (1854–1920)

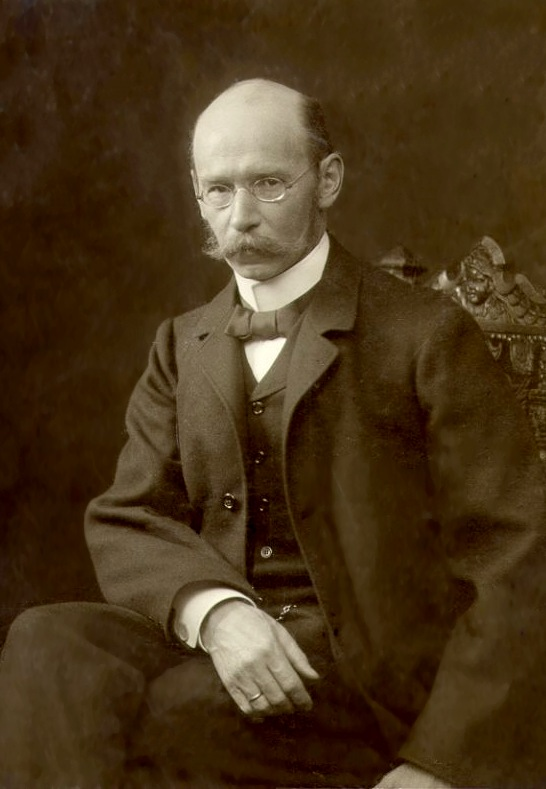
- Struve, c. 1900
- Born: 3 October [O.S. 21 September] 1854; Saint Petersburg, Russia
- Died: 12 August 1920 (aged 65); Bad Herrenalb, Germany
- Education: Imperial University of Dorpat
- Awards: Gold Medal of the Royal Astronomical Society (1903)
- Scientific career
- Fields: Astronomy
- Workplaces: Pulkovo Observatory (1882–1895); Königsberg Observatory; Berlin Observatory (1904–1920)

Karl Hermann von Struve (3 October [O.S. 21 September] 1854 – 12 August 1920) was a Baltic German astronomer. In Russian, his name is sometimes given as German Ottovich Struve (Герман Оттович Струве) or German Ottonovich Struve (Герман Оттонович Струве).

Hermann von Struve was a part of the famous group of astronomers from the Struve family, which also included his grandfather Friedrich Georg Wilhelm von Struve, father Otto Wilhelm von Struve, brother Ludwig Struve and nephew Otto Struve. Unlike other astronomers of the Struve family, Herman spent most of his career in Germany. Continuing the family tradition, Struve's research was focused on determining the positions of stellar objects. He was particularly known for his work on satellites of planets of the Solar System and development of the intersatellite method of correcting their orbital position. The mathematical Struve function is named after him.

== Biography ==
Herman was born in 1854 in Tsarskoye Selo, a former Russian residence of the imperial family and visiting nobility, located 26 kilometers (16 mi) south from the center of St. Petersburg. He attended gymnasium in Vyborg and in 1872 entered the Imperial University of Dorpat (now known as Tartu). While studying there, in 1874–1875, Struve participated in an expedition to observe transit of Venus through the disk of the Sun. That observation was carried out at Port Poisset on the Asiatic East Coast. After graduation in 1877, he became a member of the Pulkovo Observatory and was sent abroad for two-year post-graduate studies. Accompanied by his cousin's husband, Struve stayed in several cities, including Straßburg (Strasbourg), Paris, Milan, Graz and Berlin, learning from such celebrities as Helmholtz, Kirchhoff, Boltzmann and Weierstrass. After returning to Russia, he joined the staff of Pulkovo Observatory, studying the satellites of Saturn among other things.

In 1881, Struve obtained his master's degree at the Imperial University of Dorpat, with the highest honors, and in 1882 defended a PhD thesis at Saint Petersburg University (Pulkovo had no associated educational institutions). Both works were in the field of optics, in particular, the master thesis was titled "On Fresnel interference phenomenon – theoretical and experimental work"—according to Struve himself, despite the family traditions, he did not intend then to become an astronomer. Later, however, he became excited with his father's project of building a 30-inch telescope at Pulkovo, with its fantastic new possibilities for observation. Struve made extensive use of this telescope in his work. In 1883, he was appointed adjunct astronomer at Pulkovo Observatory.

By then, the Struve family was highly respected in Russia and Tsar Alexander III had a strong wish for Hermann to succeed his father Otto as the director of the Pulkovo Observatory. However, Hermann politely declined the offer, mentioning that he was in the middle of crucial observations of Saturn which would be interrupted by administrative tasks. In 1890, Struve was appointed as the senior astronomer at Pulkovo with the understanding that he should become director after completing his Saturn work. However, the death of Alexander III in 1894 freed Struve from this task. Therefore, when in 1895 Struve was offered the position of professor at Königsberg University, he gladly accepted and moved his family to Germany. There, he succeeded Wilhelm Julius Foerster as director of Königsberg Observatory. Struve was also called for the task of rescuing the Berlin Observatory. It was then located in the center of Berlin where astronomy observations were not practical and rents were too high, and discussions of its relocation stalled. Struve managed to sell the old observatory site so profitably that he could build a new observatory from scratch. The location was chosen at Neubabelsberg, near Potsdam and 25 kilometers (16 mi) from the center of Berlin, and the new institution was named Berlin-Babelsberg Observatory. There, he started installing a 26-inch Zeiss refractor and a 48-inch reflector, which would then become the largest telescope in Germany. While he did not get to operate them himself due to delays caused by World War I, the refractor was much used by his son Georg, and the reflector by his lesser-known grandson Wilfried.

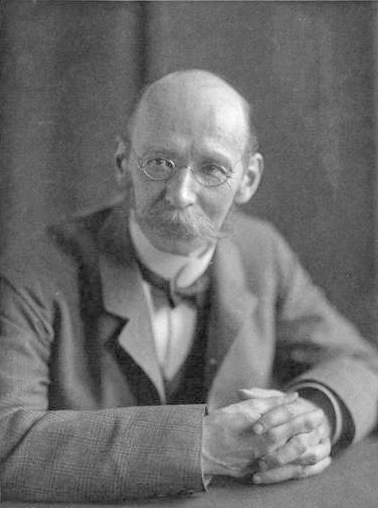
Hermann von Struve c.1900, by Rudolf Dührkoop

In 1905, Struve became professor of the University of Berlin and from 1904 until his death in 1920, he served as director of the Berlin-Babelsberg Observatory. Struve's death was accelerated by a heart illness which he suffered from during his late years and by a bad fall from a tram car in 1919. He broke a thigh, and while recovering in a sanatorium in Bad Herrenalb, died of a heart attack.

== Family matters ==
Whereas many colleagues described Struve as a stern and serious person, within his family, he was seen as a cultivated man, who enjoyed music and friends and was very proud of the Struve family traditions. Yet even among relatives, he was known as inflexible in matters of principle.

In 1885, Struve married the daughter of a cousin of his father. They had a son, Georg Otto Hermann, and a daughter, Elisabeth. George was born on 29 December 1886 in Tsarskoye Selo, Russia, and later became a famous astronomer. Hermann's wife Eva Struve played an important role in rescuing his nephew Otto. After escaping from Soviet Russia in 1920, for a year and a half he was stranded penniless in Turkey. Otto wrote to his uncle for help, unaware of his death, but Eva asked assistance of Paul Guthnick, her late husband's successor at the Berlin-Babelsberg Observatory. Whereas Guthnick was not in a position to offer a job to Struve in Germany, he highly recommended Struve to the director of Yerkes Observatory in Chicago, who not only found a job for Struve at Yerkes, but also arranged a visa for him and paid for his travel.

== Research ==
As with all astronomers of the Struve family, Herman was mostly working on establishing positions and movements of single and double stars and satellites of the planets of the Solar System. In 1885, a 30-inch refracting telescope was installed at Pulkovo, at the time the largest in the world (a great refractor). Struve was the first user of that telescope, which he used mostly for determining positions of a large number of double stars. His other major topic was Saturn, but he also studied Mars, Neptune and the fifth moon of Jupiter. He could not observe Uranus from Pulkovo because it was too far south. In 1888, Struve discovered libration of Hyperion (the seventh moon of Saturn) and explained it by the perturbing action of the largest Saturn's moon, Titan. The same year, he introduced an intersatelite method of correcting orbital position of satellites. The method was rather successful because systematic errors in visual observations of some planets, such as Mars, were unacceptably large. Struve, however, realized that the method had flaws and recommended combining planet/satellite and intersatellite measurements. In 1892, Struve discovered libration of two other moons of Saturn, Mimas and Enceladus. His observations of the moon of Mars, Phobos, were later used by B. Sharpless in studying the secular acceleration of its orbit.

Struve was known not only as an astronomer, but also as a mathematician. In 1882, he introduced a function to describe the intensity of a luminous line. This function also describes solutions of Bessel's differential equation; it therefore is widely used in mathematics and is named the Struve function.

After moving to Königsberg Observatory, Struve built a 32.5-inch refractor telescope there and continued his work on the moons of Saturn, the last observations of which he made in 1916. His other topics included a study of atmospheric refraction, stellar parallaxes, drawings of Jupiter, determination of the position of Mars' equator, the amount of its oblateness and the rate of motion of the nodes.

== Awards and honors ==
In 1897, Struve received the Damoiseau Prize from the French Academy of Sciences and in 1903 the Gold Medal of the Royal Astronomical Society, both for his work on satellites of Saturn. He was the third (after Friedrich Georg Wilhelm and Otto Wilhelm) member of Struve family to receive that medal. The asteroid 768 Struveana was named in honor of Herman, Otto Wilhelm and Friedrich Georg Wilhelm Struve.

== Sources ==
- "Струве, Герман Оттонович" . Brockhaus and Efron Encyclopedic Dictionary (in Russian). 1906.

Struve family tree

Jacob (1755–1841); Mathematician	Anton Sebastian
Carl (1785–1838); Philologist	Ernst (1786–1822)	Gustav (1788–1829)	Friedrich Georg; Wilhelm (1793–1864); Astronomer	Ludwig (1795–1828); Anatomist	Johann Christoph Gustav (1763–1828); Diplomat
Otto Wilhelm (1819–1905); Astronomer	Heinrich (1822–1908); Chemist	Berngard (1827–1889); Russian governor	Karl (1835–1907); Politician	Johann Ludwig (1812–1898)	Gustav (1805–1870); Politician
Karl Hermann (1854–1920); Astronomer	Gustav Ludwig (1858–1920); Astronomer	Vasily Berngardovich (1854–1912); Mathematician	Peter Berngardovich (1870–1944); Revolutionary	Alexander; Berngardovich
Georg Hermann (1886–1933); Astronomer	Otto (1897–1963); Astronomer	Vasily Vasilevich (1889–1965); Historian	Gleb (1898–1985); Poet	Aleksey (1899–1976); Library founder
Wilfried (1914–1992); Astronomer	Nikita Alexeyevich (1931–2016); Author
