= Struve family =

Baltic German noble family

The Struve family (pronounced [ˈʃtʁuvə] in German, [ˈstruvɪ] in Russian) were a Baltic German noble family of Eastphalian origin and originated in Magdeburg, the family produced five generations of astronomers from the 18th to 20th centuries. Members of the family were also prominent in chemistry, government and diplomacy.

== Origins ==
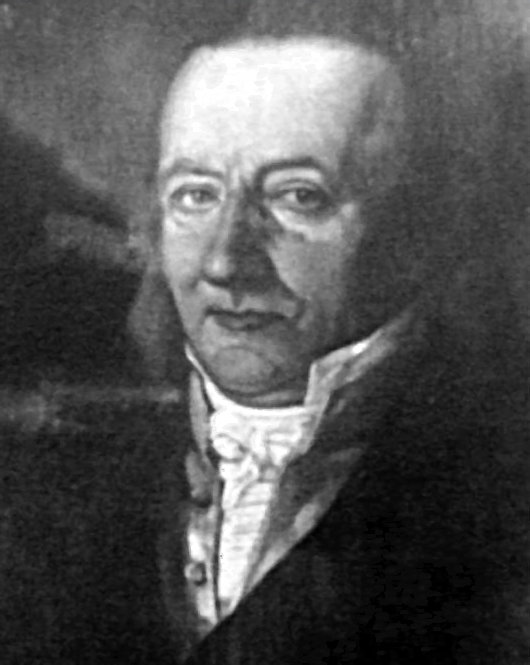
Jacob Struve

The first branch of the family that produced five generations of astronomers originated in Altona, then part of both Denmark and Germany The first scientist member of the family was mathematician Jacob Struve (1755–1841); his forebears included Johann Struve (1700–1778) and Abel Struve (1719–1762). In 1783, Jacob Struve married Maria Emerentia Wiese (1764–1847). Their children were:

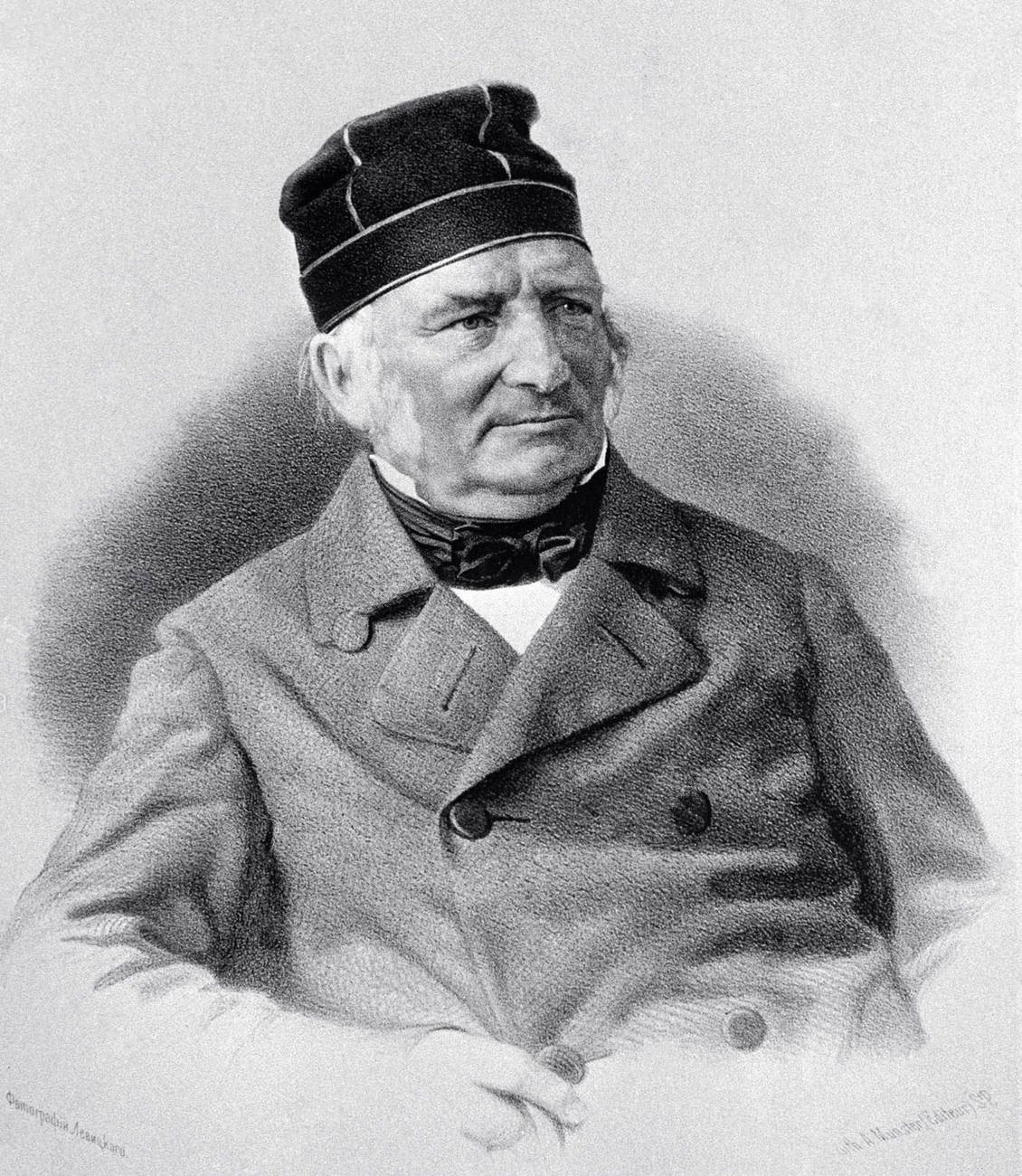
Friedrich Georg Wilhelm von Struve

- Carl Ludwig Struve (1785–1838)
- Ernst Heinrich Struve (1786–1822)
- Gustav Philipp Christoph Struve (1788–1829)
- Christiane Regine Elisabeth Struve (1791–1853)
- Friedrich Georg Wilhelm (von) Struve (1793–1864)
- Ludwig August Struve (1795–1828)
- Johanna Marie Struve (1797–1871)

In the beginning of the 19th century, Jacob Struve sent his sons to Dorpat (now Tartu, Estonia) in the Russian Empire to avoid conscription in the Napoleonic armies. His fourth son, Friedrich Georg Wilhelm, taught at the University of Dorpat from 1813 and was full professor and director of Dorpat Observatory from 1820. Ennobled by Tsar Nicholas I, at whose request he supervised construction of Pulkovo Observatory, he served as director of the new observatory from 1839 to 1862.

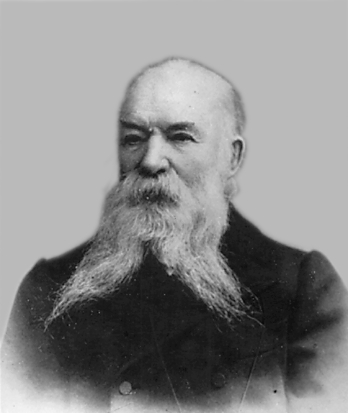
Heinrich Wilhelm von Struve

Friedrich Georg Wilhelm married Emilie Wall (1796–1834) in 1815. They had 12 children, including the following:

- Otto Wilhelm von Struve (1819–1905), astronomer
- Heinrich Wilhelm von Struve (1822–1908), chemist
- Bernhard Wilhelm von Struve (1827–1889), government official in Siberia and later governor of Perm and Astrakhan.

Following the death of his first wife, he married Johanna Henrietta Francisca Barthels (1807–1867). They had six children, including Karl von Struve (1835–1907), diplomat.

Jacob Struve's cousin, Anton Sebastian von Struve, was President of the German Eternal Imperial Diet at Regensburg and later a Russian Imperial Provy Councillor. He and his wife, née Johanne Dorothea Werner, were the parents of:

- Catherina Elisabetha von Struve (1759–1838)
- Johann Christoph Gustav von Struve (1763–1828)
- Johann Georg von Struve (1766–1831)
- Johann Christian von Struve (1768–1812)
- August Wilhelm von Struve (1770–1838)
- Heinrich Christoph Gottfried von Struve (1772–1851)
- Albrecht von Struve (1774–1794)
- Philippine Rosina Elisabetha von Struve (1775–1819)

== Otto Wilhelm von Struve line (3rd gen) ==
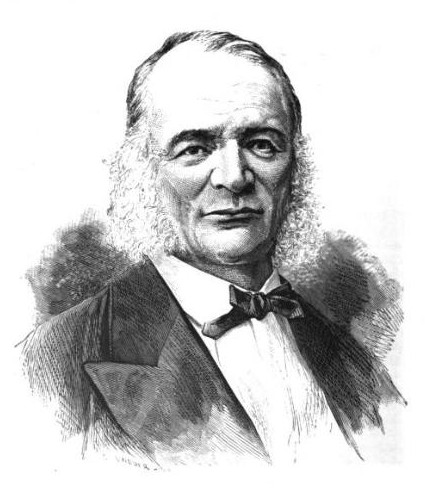
Otto Wilhelm von Struve

Otto Wilhelm von Struve (1819–1905) was director of Pulkovo Observatory from 1862 to 1889; he moved to Germany in 1889. He married 1) Emilie Dyrssen (1823–1868); 2) Emma Jankowsky (1839–1902). The children from his two marriages were:

- August Eduard Alfred von Struve (1845–1916)
- Emma Wilhelmine von Struve (1850-unknown)
- Karl Hermann von Struve (1854–1920), astronomer; moved to Germany 1895
- Therese Pauline von Klot (von Struve) (1857–1880), buried in Pulkovo Observatory along with parents.
- Gustav Ludwig von Struve (1858–1920), astronomer
- Emilie Nathalie Wilhelmine Struve (1874–1965)

Karl Hermann von Struve had a son, Georg Otto Hermann Struve (1886–1933), who was also an astronomer. Georg Otto Hermann had two sons, Wilfried Struve (1914–1992) and Rheinhard Struve (1919–1943).

Gustav Ludiwig von Struve (1858–1920) and his wife, Elizaveta, had a son Otto Struve (1897–1963), who became a prominent astronomer in the United States following fighting in World War I and for White Russians in the Russian Revolution. His other son, Warner was an officer for the White Russians but died from tuberculosis. His daughter, the youngest, drowned in the same period. Gustav had to leave Russia and went with his surviving son Otto Struve into exile in Turkey, where he died in 1920 at age 62.

Otto Struve (1897–1963) then got a job in the United States through his Uncle Hermann von Struve, who lived and worked at Berlin-Babelsberg Observatory. After moving to the United States, Otto Struve married Mary Martha Lanning in 1925, but there were no children.

== Berngard Vasilyevich Struve line (3rd gen) ==
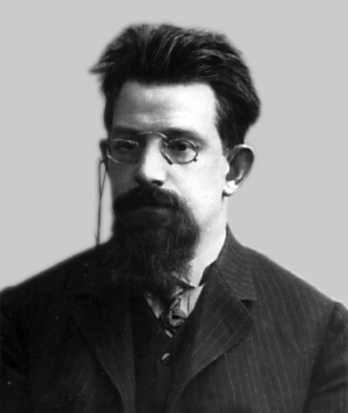
Peter Berngardovich Struve

Berngard Vasilyevich Struve (1827–1889) was a government official in Siberia before serving in turn as governor of Perm and Astrakhan. He was the father of:

- Vasily Berngardovich Struve (1854–1912)
- Peter Berngardovich Struve (1870–1944), political economist, philosopher and editor
- Alexander Berngardovich Struve, confidential secretary

Vasily Berngardovich Struve married Borisa Alexandrovna Turaeva (1868–1920). They were the parents of:

- Vasily Vasilevich Struve (1889–1965), academic.

Peter Berngardovich Struve emigrated to France following the Russian Revolution. He was the father of:

- Gleb Petrovich Struve (1898–1985), poet and literary historian
- Aleksey Petrovich Struve
- Konstantin Petrovich Struve (1903–1948)
- Arkady Petrovich Struve (1905–1951)

Aleksey Petrovich Struve married Ekaterina Andreevna Katuar. Their children were:

- Peter Struve (1925–1968)
- Nikita Struve (1931–2016), professor and editor of several Russian-language periodicals in Europe.

== Karl von Struve line (3rd gen) ==
Karl von Struve (1835–1907) was Russian minister to Japan, the United States (1882–1892) and the Netherlands (1892–1904). In line with German practice, he was entitled to use the title of Baron von Struve while abroad, though this was denied him while resident in Germany or Russia. The American press generally rendered his title as Baron de Struve.

He and his wife, Maria Nikolaevna Annenkova (1844–1889) were the parents of:

- Boris de Struve (d. 1912)
- Vera de Struve (1876–1949)
- Olga de Struve
- Elena de Struve
- Maroussia de Struve

Owing to ill health, his wife Maria returned to Russia in 1885, dying at Kielmarky, near St. Petersburg in 1889.

== Other lines ==
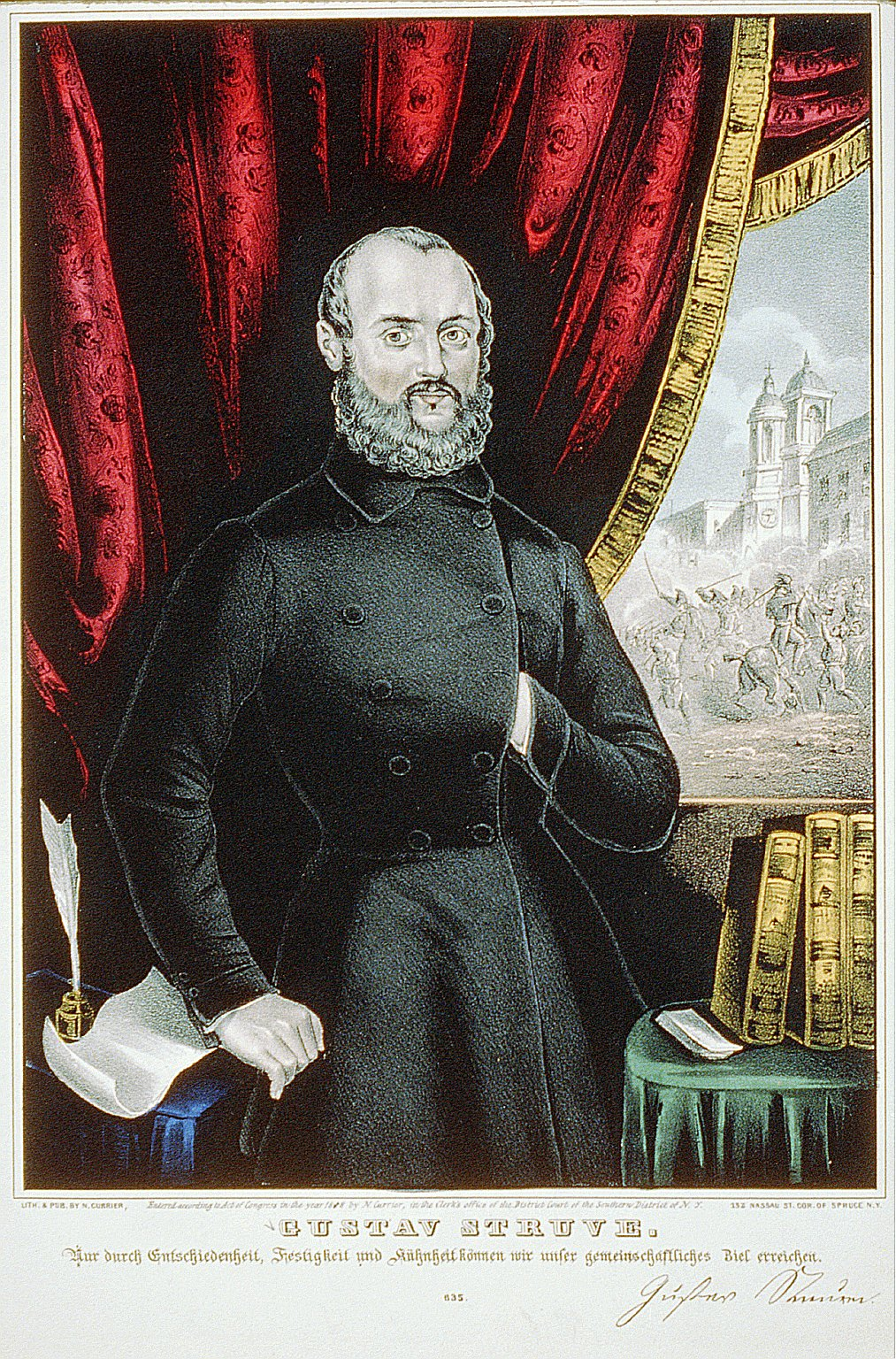
Gustav von Struve

Friedrich Georg Wilhelm von Struve's cousin, Johann Christoph Gustav von Struve, son of diplomat Anton Sebastian von Struve. "After finishing his studies and several extensive journeyings (sic), Anton started his career as private secretary to Count Schonberg, Minister in Dresden. In 1755 he entered the services of the Duke of Holstein-Gottrop, who later as Peter III became emperor of Russia, and thus became a Russian subject, along with his 2 brothers who were also induced to accompany Peter to Russia. One of these was the celebrated astronomer, Friedrich Georg Wilhelm von Struve, and the third, the scientist. Anton Sebastian, after several diplomatic missions in Russian services, ended as Resident Minister at the German Reichstag at Regensburg. He died April 7, 1802. Hi biography is to be found in Schlichtegroll's "Nekrolog der Deutschen für das 19th. Jahrhundert". He had 12 children, but only five sons and four daughters attained maturity. Of these, only the eldest (Gustav von Struve, Sept. 26,1763 – 1828), and the youngest (Henry, 1772–1851), and Phillipine (She married President von Grün), the youngest daughter, had issue." (incorrect – see below) (1729–1802), became a diplomat in the Russian service primarily in Regensburg, Bavaria. Johann Christoph and his wife, née Sibilla Christiana Friedrike von Hochstetter, were the parents of 11 children, among them: "*Elise (1795-18440) unmarried

- Anton 1797–1846) As Russian Plenipotentiary in Frankfurt, married St. Clair von Trotter. Issue: one daughter, St. Clair, married von Gemningen.
- Amand (1798–1867) who brought the biography up to date and wrote of their happy family life – a most interesting biography of his father who must have been an unusually fine character. The mother also. Married Karoline von Kalenberg. One son, Alexander (1838–1855).
- Sophie born January, 1801, married 1832 to the Neapolitan Captain Karl von Manuel who fell in the battle of Messina, 1848. 5 children.
- Georg Heinrich Christoph Franz Von Struve (August 29, 1802 – 1886). Married Eugenie von Witte (born June 12, 1809 in Posen, daughter of War and Dominions Councilor Karl Von Witte, who died 6 months after his daughter's birth. Entered his service in January, 1827 he was busy at the technical bureau in Warsaw, the Finance Ministry, and the Zoological Gardens near Warsaw in Skiernievice until in 1830 he was nominated permanent officer of the Forestry Department. After the rising and settlement in November, 1830 the Department was relayed to Russia proper, and he was now credited to the Imperial Russian Forestry Department, with Gasiorovo to live in. In January, 1841 he became Chief of Forestry Ministerium and ad to inspect all the Imperial forests in Polan, being responsible for their upkeep. He and Eugenie had 16 children.
- Katharine (born Dec. 26, 1803, died July, 1855)
- Gustav von Struve (1805–1870), a publicist, political agitator and soldier who emigrated the United States following the collapse of the Baden Revolution of 1848.
- Friederike (born 1807) Married 1837 Baron Joseph von Gemmingen. 5 children.
- Phillipine (born 1809) Lived in Zurich, Switzerland"
- Johann Ludwig Karl Heinrich von Struve (1812–1898), who emigrated to Fayette County, Texas after the failure of the Revolution of 1848, but eventually returned to Rothenberg in der Odenwald, near Darmstadt, Germany where he died. His two eldest sons with his first wife Stephanie von Borowski; Friedrich Wilhelm Amand Struve (1838–1902) and Louis Joseph Struve (1839–1921), remained in Texas even though the remainder of Heinrich's family returned to Germany with him.

Another line was represented by Henry G. Struve (1836–1905), a native of the Grand Duchy of Oldenburg who emigrated to the United States in 1852. An attorney, he was elected mayor of Seattle, Washington, in 1882 and 1883. Struve and his wife, the former Lascelle Knighton, were the parents of:

- Harry K. Struve
- Helen (Mrs. Harry F. Meserve)
- Frederick Karl Struve
- Mary Struve

His younger son, Frederick Karl Struve, was elected president of the Seattle National Bank in 1914.

== Family traditions ==
Jacob Struve once expressed his attitude to life in his letter to Friedrich, which characterizes the family spirit

A teneris adsuescere multum est. Wir Struve können nicht ohne anhaltende Arbeit vergnügt leben, weil wir von frühester Jugend an uns überzeugt haben, daß sie die nützlichste und beste Würze des Menschenlebens ist. (We, Struve, can not live happily without continuous work, because from the young age we learn that it is the most useful and best virtue of human life.)

During the astronomical observations, members of the Struve family wore the Beobachtungskäppchen ("cap for observation"), which was made for the husband by his bride. The cap was handmade from red velvet and had golden threads embedded around it. The number of threads corresponded to the generation, so Friedrich Georg Wilhelm had one and Georg Hermann four.

Struve family tree

Jacob (1755–1841); Mathematician	Anton Sebastian
Carl (1785–1838); Philologist	Ernst (1786–1822)	Gustav (1788–1829)	Friedrich Georg; Wilhelm (1793–1864); Astronomer	Ludwig (1795–1828); Anatomist	Johann Christoph Gustav (1763–1828); Diplomat
Otto Wilhelm (1819–1905); Astronomer	Heinrich (1822–1908); Chemist	Berngard (1827–1889); Russian governor	Karl (1835–1907); Politician	Johann Ludwig (1812–1898)	Gustav (1805–1870); Politician
Karl Hermann (1854–1920); Astronomer	Gustav Ludwig (1858–1920); Astronomer	Vasily Berngardovich (1854–1912); Mathematician	Peter Berngardovich (1870–1944); Revolutionary	Alexander; Berngardovich
Georg Hermann (1886–1933); Astronomer	Otto (1897–1963); Astronomer	Vasily Vasilevich (1889–1965); Historian	Gleb (1898–1985); Poet	Aleksey (1899–1976); Library founder
Wilfried (1914–1992); Astronomer	Nikita Alexeyevich (1931–2016); Author

== See also ==
- List of Russian astronomers and astrophysicists
