= Vasily Struve =

Vasily Struve may refer to:

- Friedrich Georg Wilhelm von Struve, Baltic German astronomer and geodesist
- Vasily Struve (historian), Soviet orientalist
