= J.F. Normano =

J. F. Normano (also known as John F. Normano, João Frederico Normano; true name: Isaac Ilyich Levin, Russian: Исаак Ильич Левин) (12 July 1887 – 25 April 1945) was a Russian-American economic historian and banker.

== Early life ==
Isaac Levin was born in Kiev and grew up in the Russian/Ukrainian Jewish community. He studied at the Saint Petersburg State Polytechnical University, where his main teacher was Peter Berngardovich Struve.

== Career ==
Levin began in banking. Politically, he was close to the liberal Kadets. For the newspaper Nash Vek, he wrote a critical article on Lenin’s economic thinking.

He left Russia for Finland and moved to “Russian Berlin” in 1921. There, by 1926, he had accumulated sufficient capital to buy a private bank. Levin's bank become insolvent in 1929.

After moving to Paris, he left for Brazil, called himself João Frederico Normano (i.e. John Frederic Normano) and claimed to be 40 years old. This double passport-forgery was tailored to help him become a junior scientist at Harvard. He became the associate director of the Harvard Bureau of Economic Research in Latin America and published a book that some consider essential to the theory of Brazilian economic development. In December 1932, his real identity was discovered. After the Nazi rise to power, the “Normano Case” led to foreign political conflict. The German Foreign Office demanded his extradition, but the US government was pressured by the Jewish Community. Levin was not forced to leave the United States. He was expelled from Harvard. As of 1941 he focused on lecturing and research with a Pacific emphasis. However, before he could become really influential in this area, he died in April 1945. In the literature of the Stalin era, he was only briefly mentioned in a systemic ideological classification. In 2010 a book about him was published in Moscow, with reprints of his works.

== Major works ==
- Normano, J. F.: The Struggle for South America. Economy and Ideology, London 1931 and Boston 1931(re-edited Westport 1973). Brazilian edition: A Luta pela América do Sul, São Paulo 1944.
- Normano, J. F.: Brazil – A Study of Economic Types, Chapel Hill 1935 (re-edited: New York 1968). Brazilian edition:
- Normano, J. F.: Evolução econômica do Brasil, São Paulo 1939 (re-edited São Paulo 1945, São Paulo 1975).
- Normano, J. F.: The Spirit of American Economics, New York 1943.
- Normano, J. F.: Asia between Two World Wars, New York 1944.
- Normano, J. F.: The Spirit of Russian Economics, New York 1945.

== Literature ==
- Jerochina, Olga: Ученый-экономист И.И. Левин: жизнь и деятельность в России до 1918 года (The economist I. I. Levin: Life and work in Russia until 1918). In: Terra Economicus, Rostov University, 7 (2009) 3, S. 128–132.
- Andrei A. Belych (ed.): И.И. Левин: Акционерные коммерческие банки в России (I. I. Levin: Joint-stock commercial banks in Russia), Moscow 2010.
- Lembke, Hans H.: Bankier, Fälscher, Historiker. Der Weg des Isaac Lewin durch die Geschichte seiner Zeit (Banker, Forger, Historian. Isaac Levin's way through time), Freiburg 2012.
