= NGC 107 =

Spiral galaxy in the constellation Cetus

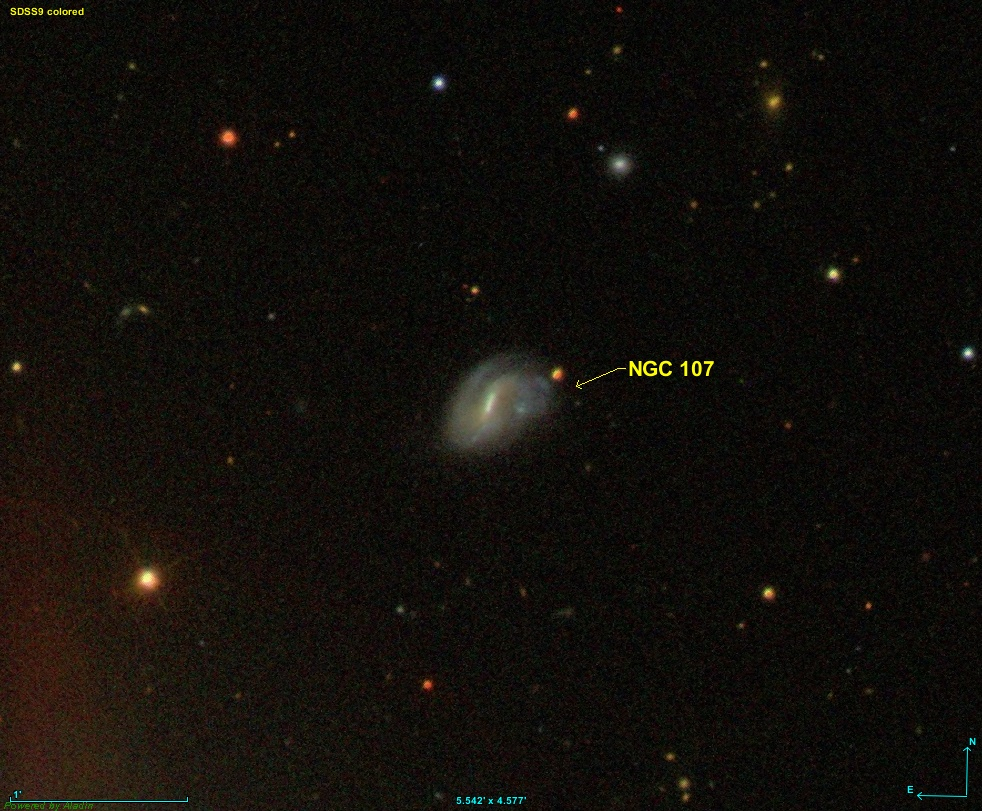
- SDSS image of NGC 107

Observation data (J2000 epoch)
- Constellation: Cetus
- Right ascension: 00^{h} 25^{m} 42.185^{s}
- Declination: −08° 16′ 58.07″
- Redshift: 0.020978
- Heliocentric radial velocity: 6289
- Apparent magnitude (B): 15.67

Characteristics
- Type: Sbc
- Size: 48,100 ly (14,750 pc) (Note: POSS1 103a-O values used.)
- Apparent size (V): 0.6′ × 0.5′

Other designations
- PGC 1606, 2MASX J00254218-0816580

NGC 107 is a spiral galaxy estimated to be about 280 million light-years away in the constellation of Cetus. It was discovered by Otto Struve in 1866 and its magnitude is 14.2.
