= NGC 7427 =

Galaxy in the constellation Pegasus

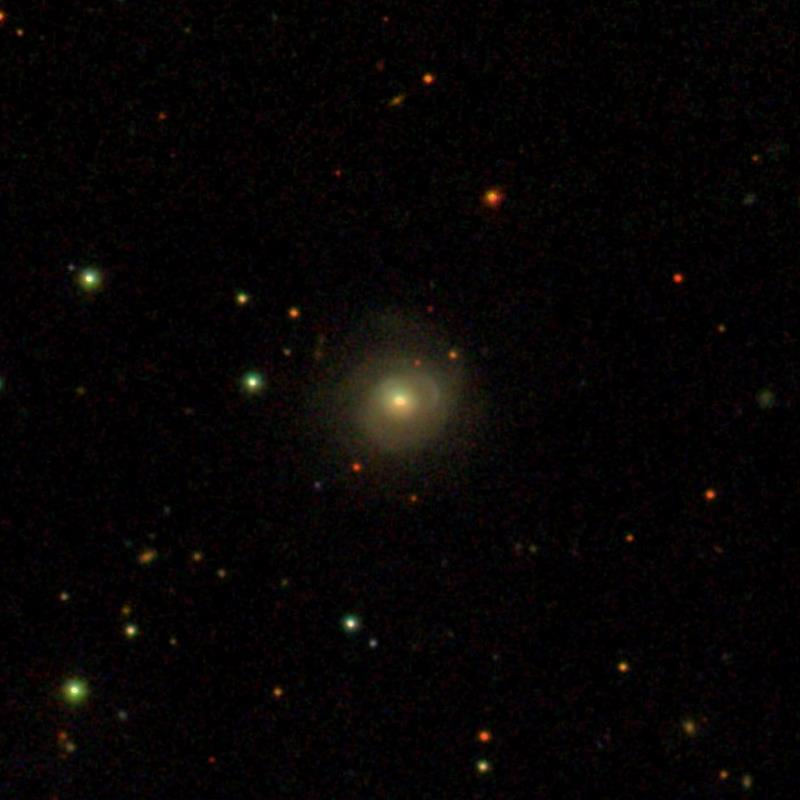
- NGC 7427 imaged by SDSS

Observation data (J2000 epoch)
- Constellation: Pegasus
- Right ascension: 22^{h} 57^{m} 09.9277^{s}
- Declination: +08° 30′ 20.435″
- Redshift: 0.032376
- Heliocentric radial velocity: 9706 ± 24 km/s
- Distance: 449.1 ± 31.5 Mly (137.70 ± 9.66 Mpc)
- Apparent magnitude (V): 15.1

Characteristics
- Type: SO
- Size: ~97,100 ly (29.76 kpc) (estimated)
- Apparent size (V): 0.7′ × 0.7′

Other designations
- 2MASX J22570990+0830200, MCG +01-58-016, Mrk 521, PGC 70091, CGCG 405-018

NGC 7427 is a lenticular galaxy in the constellation of Pegasus. Its velocity with respect to the cosmic microwave background is 9336 ± 35 km/s, which corresponds to a Hubble distance of 137.70 ± 9.66 Mpc (~449 million light-years). It was discovered by Russian astronomer Otto Wilhelm von Struve on 22 November 1865.

== Supernovae ==
Two supernovae have been observed in NGC 7427:

- SN 2019uzd (Type Ia, mag. 18.94) was discovered by the Automatic Learning for the Rapid Classification of Events (ALeRCE) on 16 November 2019.
- SN 2023uma (Type Ia, mag. 18.13) was discovered by the Zwicky Transient Facility on 9 October 2023.

== See also ==
- List of NGC objects (7001–7840)
