= 991 McDonalda =

Main-belt asteroid

Discovery
- Discovered by: O. Struve
- Discovery site: Williams Bay
- Discovery date: 24 October 1922

Designations
- Named after: McDonald Observatory
- Alternative designations: 1922 NB, 1949 PF, 1950 WG, 1953 GT1, 1975 EE6

Orbital characteristics
- Epoch 31 July 2016 (JD 2457600.5)
- Uncertainty parameter 0
- Observation arc: 80.10 yr (29255 days)
- Aphelion: 3.6381 AU (544.25 Gm)
- Perihelion: 2.6458 AU (395.81 Gm)
- Semi-major axis: 3.1419 AU (470.02 Gm)
- Eccentricity: 0.15791
- Orbital period (sidereal): 5.57 yr (2034.2 d)
- Mean anomaly: 351.48°
- Mean motion: 0° 10^{m} 37.092^{s} / day
- Inclination: 2.0696°
- Longitude of ascending node: 63.255°
- Argument of perihelion: 254.682°

Physical characteristics
- Mean radius: 15.705±1.05 km
- Geometric albedo: 0.0638±0.009
- Spectral type: C
- Absolute magnitude (H): 11.12

991 McDonalda is a Themistian asteroid. It was discovered by Otto Struve in 1922 at the Yerkes Observatory in Williams Bay, Wisconsin, United States. It is named after the McDonald Observatory, which Struve helped found in 1939.
