= NGC 9 =

Galaxy in the constellation Pegasus

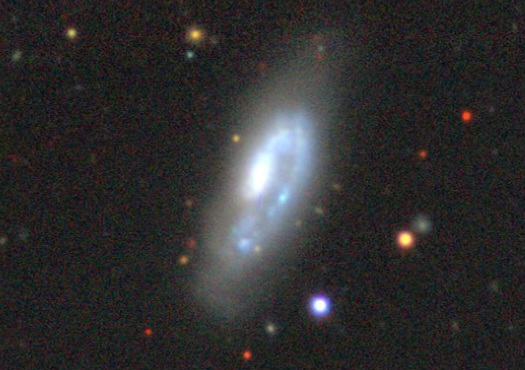
- NGC 9 from DESI Legacy Surveys

Observation data (J2000 epoch)
- Constellation: Pegasus
- Right ascension: 00^{h} 08^{m} 54.7^{s}
- Declination: +23° 49′ 01″
- Redshift: 0.015104
- Heliocentric radial velocity: 4528 ± 10 km/s
- Distance: 142 ± 31 Mly (43.5 ± 9.5 Mpc)
- Apparent magnitude (V): 14.35
- Absolute magnitude (V): —18.69

Characteristics
- Type: Sb: pec
- Apparent size (V): 1.3' x 0.7'

Other designations
- NGC 9, UGC 78, PGC 652

NGC 9 is a spiral galaxy about 140 million light-years away in the constellation Pegasus. It was discovered on 27 September 1865 by Russian astronomer Otto Wilhelm von Struve.

== Supernova ==
One supernova has been observed in NGC 9: SN 2021zju (type Ib, mag. 18.15).
