= 768 Struveana =

Main-belt asteroid

Discovery
- Discovered by: G. N. Neujmin
- Discovery site: Simeiz Observatory
- Discovery date: 4 October 1913

Designations
- Alternative designations: 1913 SZ
- Minor planet category: main-belt · (outer); Meliboea

Orbital characteristics
- Epoch 31 July 2016 (JD 2457600.5)
- Uncertainty parameter 0
- Observation arc: 85.46 yr (31216 d)
- Aphelion: 3.8037 AU (569.03 Gm)
- Perihelion: 2.4799 AU (370.99 Gm)
- Semi-major axis: 3.1418 AU (470.01 Gm)
- Eccentricity: 0.21068
- Orbital period (sidereal): 5.57 yr (2034.1 d)
- Mean anomaly: 139.156°
- Mean motion: 0° 10^{m} 37.128^{s} / day
- Inclination: 16.265°
- Longitude of ascending node: 38.908°
- Argument of perihelion: 16.794°

Physical characteristics
- Synodic rotation period: 8.76 h (0.365 d)
- Absolute magnitude (H): 10.21

768 Struveana is a minor planet orbiting the Sun. The asteroid was named jointly in honor of Baltic German astronomers Friedrich Georg Wilhelm von Struve, Otto Wilhelm von Struve and Karl Hermann Struve.
