= Wilfried Struve =

German astronomer (1914–1992)

Wilfried Hermann Georg Struve (1914–1992) was a German scientist. He started his career as a sixth-generation astronomer, a direct successor in the famous family line of Friedrich Georg Wilhelm, Otto Wilhelm, Hermann, Georg Hermann Struve. He fought for Germany in World War II and after the war changed his field from astronomy to acoustics.

Wilfried Struve was born in 1914 in Wilhelmshaven, Germany, as the first son of Georg Otto Hermann von Struve and Marie Julie von Mock. He studied astronomy at the University of Heidelberg and, after the death of his father in 1933, moved to Berlin University. Between 1934 and 1937, he worked as a voluntary at the Berlin-Babelsberg Observatory, which was established by his grandfather Hermann and further developed by his father, and mainly operated the 1.2-meter reflecting telescope which was planned to be built by Hermann. In 1939, shortly after the death of his mother, Wilfried defended his PhD thesis on spectroscopical study of the double star alpha Aurigae (Capella). At the beginning of World War II, Wilfried was enlisted to the infantry at Frankfurt an der Oder and first fought in Poland, France and the Baltic coast of Germany. Later, he obtained a position of an official at the meteorological unit of the Luftwaffe. The end of the war found him at the Baltic coast of Germany, from where he walked to Berlin to reunite with his family. After the war, he settled in Karlsruhe and changed his scientific field from astronomy to acoustics and became consultant to a large company. He died in Karlsruhe in 1992 at the age of 78.

Struve had a younger brother Reinhard (1919–1943), who also fought in World War II. He was captured after the Battle of Stalingrad and died in a Soviet prison camp. Wilfried married in 1941 and had two sons; one was studying mathematics and another worked as a teacher with handicapped children.
