= Otto Struve =

Russian-American astronomer (1897–1963)

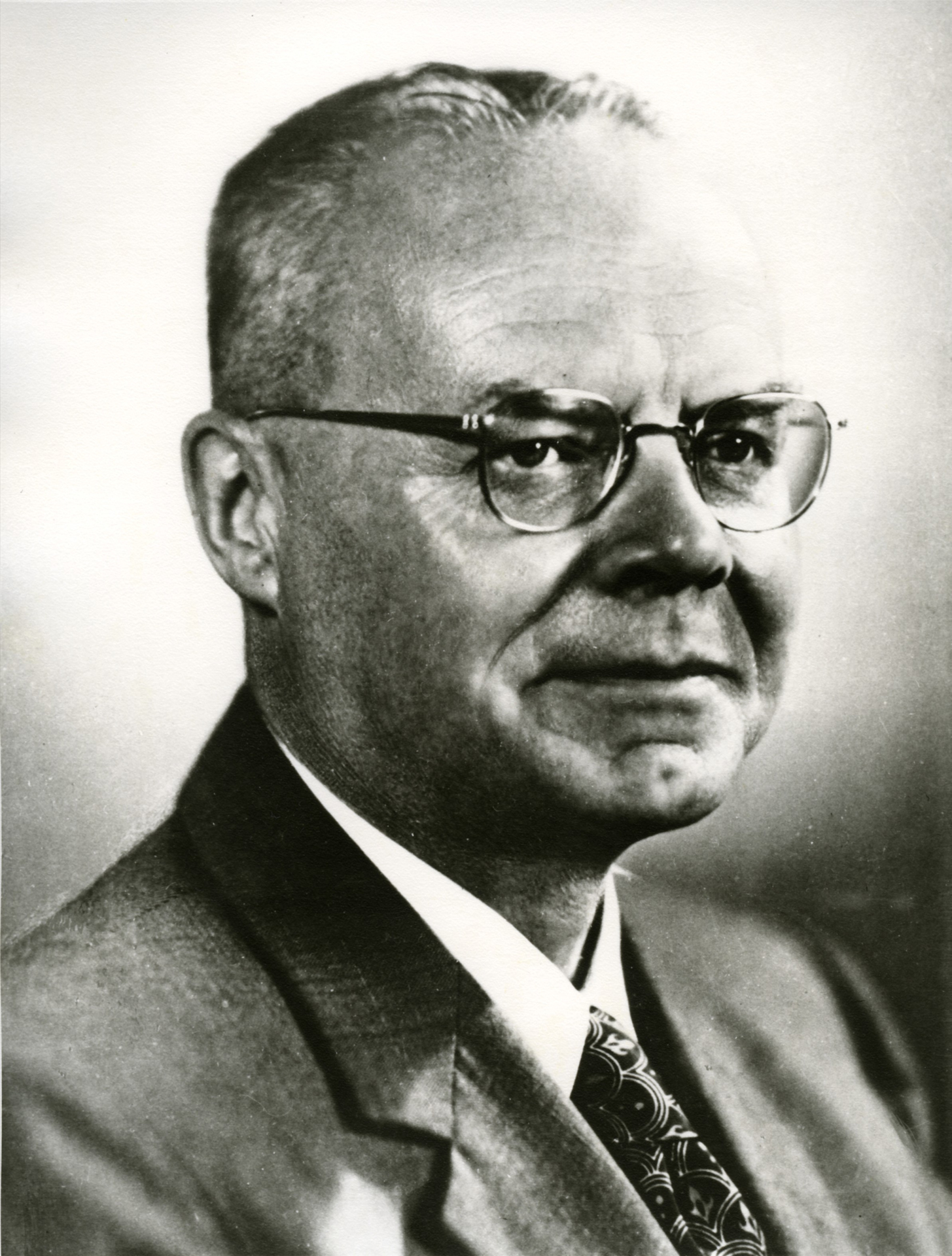
- Born: Отто Людвигович Струве; August 12, 1897; Kharkov, Russian Empire
- Died: April 6, 1963 (aged 65); Berkeley, California, U.S.
- Education: Kharkov University; University of Chicago
- Known for: Doppler spectroscopy Struve–Sahade effect
- Awards: Fellow of the Royal Society; Henry Norris Russell Lectureship (1957); Prix Jules Janssen (1954); Henry Draper Medal (1949); Bruce Medal (1948); Gold Medal of the Royal Astronomical Society (1944)
- Scientific career
- Fields: Astronomy
- Workplaces: University of Chicago; University of California, Berkeley

Otto Lyudvigovich Struve (Russian: Отто Людвигович Струве; 12 August 1897 – 6 April 1963) was a Russian-American astronomer of Baltic German origin. Otto was the descendant of famous astronomers of the Struve family; he was the son of Ludwig Struve, grandson of Otto Wilhelm von Struve and great-grandson of Friedrich Georg Wilhelm von Struve. He was also the nephew of Karl Hermann Struve.

With more than 900 journal articles and books, Struve was one of the most distinguished and prolific astronomers of the mid-20th century. He served as director of Yerkes, McDonald, Leuschner and National Radio Astronomy Observatories and is credited with raising worldwide prestige and building schools of talented scientists at Yerkes and McDonald observatories. In particular, he hired Subrahmanyan Chandrasekhar and Gerhard Herzberg who later became Nobel Prize winners. Struve's research was mostly focused on binary and variable stars, stellar rotation and interstellar matter. He was one of the few eminent astronomers in the pre-Space Age era to publicly express a belief that extraterrestrial intelligence was abundant, and so was an early advocate of the search for extraterrestrial life.

== Early years in Russia ==
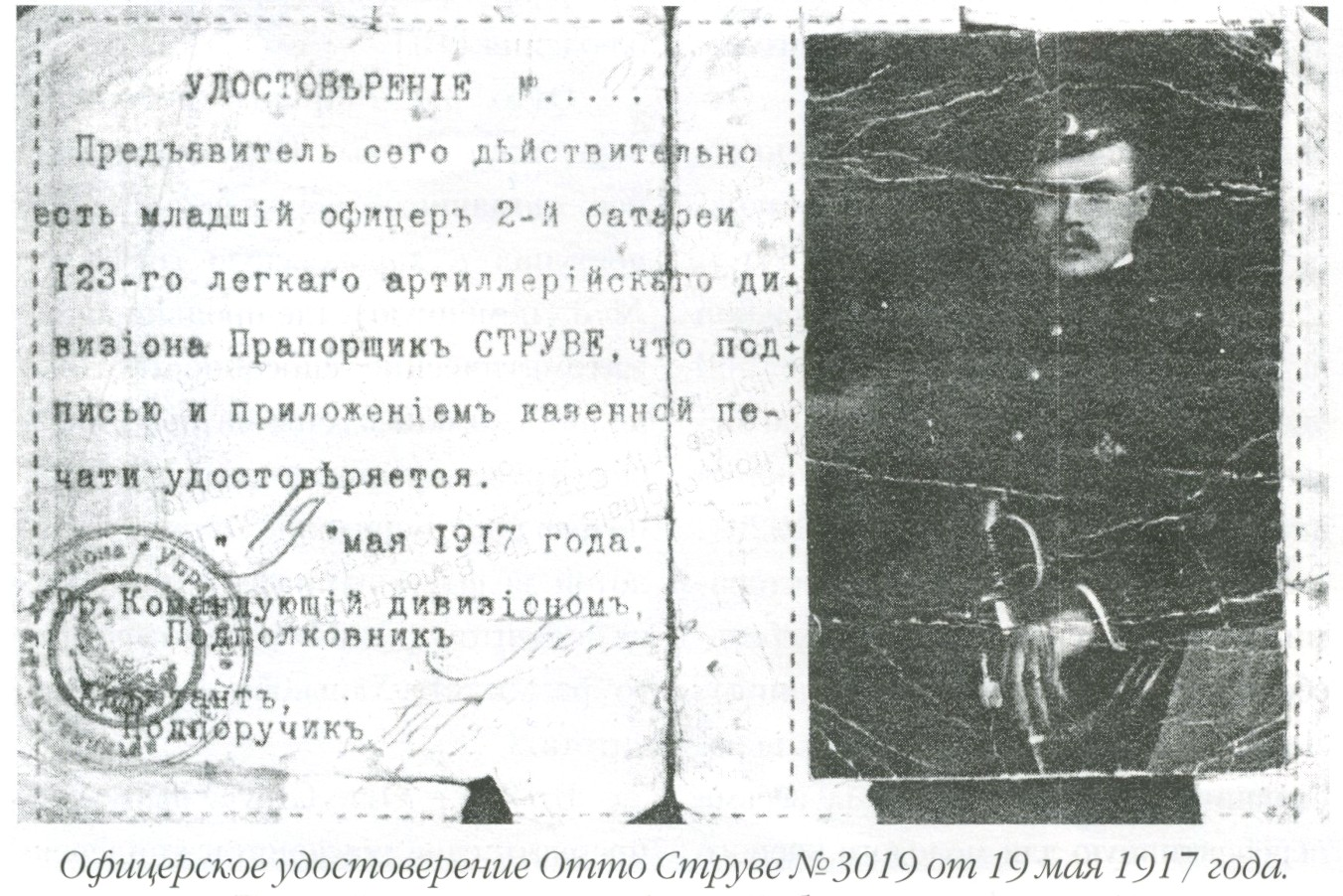
Military officer card of Struve issued on 19 May 1917

Struve was born in 1897 in Kharkov, the largest city of Sloboda Ukraine, then Russian Empire (now Ukraine), as the first child of Ludwig Struve and Elizaveta Khristoforovna Struve (1874–1964). His father was a member of the prominent Baltic German Struve family. His astronomy experience started early: from the age of eight, he was accompanying father in the telescope tower and from ten carried out some minor observations, despite his fear of the dark spaces. After having received home education, at the age of twelve, Struve started attending a school in Kharkov and showed mathematical talents. Otto was the first child of the Struve family in Russia who attended a Russian-speaking rather than German-speaking school, and was bilingual in German and Russian. After graduating in 1914, he continued his astronomy work. In June 1914, Struve took part in preparations for observation of a total solar eclipse (August 21, 1914) and later used that experience and results for his master's degree work defended in 1919 at Kharkov University.

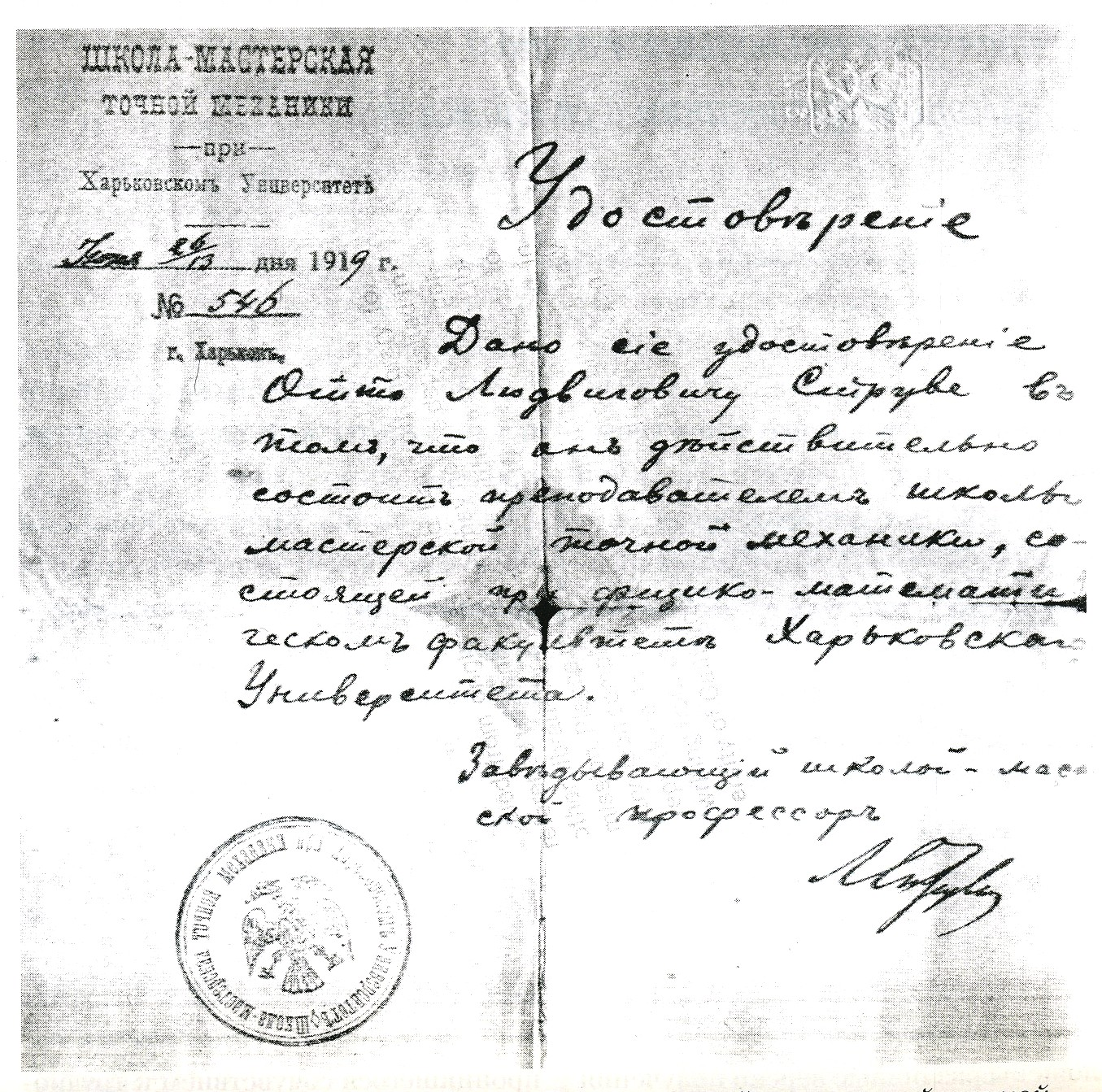
Struve's diploma of trainer at the workshop school of precision mechanics, issued on 26 June 1919.

Struve entered the Imperial Kharkov University in 1915, at the time of political unrest and wars in Russia. In the beginning of 1916, just having finished the first semester, he interrupted his studies and enlisted to a military artillery school in St. Petersburg. He passed an accelerated training program, and in February 1917, was sent to the Turkish front. After the Treaty of Brest-Litovsk was signed, Struve returned to Kharkov for a year between spring 1918 and spring 1919 and completed a full university course. in June 1919, he received a certificate signed by the rector of Kharkov University stating that Struve would stay with the university to prepare for professorship at the department of astronomy and geodesics. During that time, Struve also worked at the "workshop school of precision mechanics" and obtained a license of a workshop trainer. The workshop was organized by his father with the goal of creating traditions of astronomy engineers in Russia. Those were non-existent and foreign engineers were personally invited from abroad for high-quality mechanical work.

== Moving to the United States ==
The noble origin of Struves and the military history of Otto Struve with the White Russian Army took its toll. To avoid repression by the Bolsheviks, his family had to move from Kharkov to Sevastopol which was still under control of the White Army. There, a series of tragedies took away most of the family: the youngest sister Elizabeth drowned, brother Werner died from tuberculosis, and his father died from a stroke on November 4, 1920. Whereas his mother and sister chose to return to Kharkov, on November 16–17, 1920, Otto followed the escaping Wrangel's Army. With a military transport, he escaped from Sevastopol to Turkey. He never returned to Russia. He was later invited several times to conferences in the Soviet Union, but for various reasons declined to attend.

During the year and a half that Otto spent in exile in Gallipoli and later in Constantinople, he became an impoverished refugee, eating at relief agencies and taking any job he could find. For some time, he worked as a woodcutter, residing with fellow Russian officers, often 6 people in a tent. One night, a neighboring tent was hit by lightning, killing everyone inside. Struve wrote to his uncle Hermann Struve in Germany for assistance, without knowing that his uncle had died a few months earlier, on August 12, 1920. However, the widow of Hermann, Eva Struve, contacted Paul Guthnick, her late husband's successor at the Berlin-Babelsberg Observatory. Germany itself was suffering after the wars, and there was little chance to obtain a position for a Russian there. Therefore, Guthnick wrote, on December 25, 1920, to the director of Yerkes Observatory in Williams Bay, Wisconsin, Edwin B. Frost asking a position for Struve. He received a reply on January 27, 1921, where Frost promised to do his best. On March 2, 1921, Frost wrote to Struve, offering him a position at Yerkes. Given his situation in Turkey, it was a lucky chance that Struve received that letter. On March 11, Struve sent a reply, thanking Frost for the offer and accepting it. The letter was formally written in English but with German grammar, revealing the poor English proficiency of Struve (when they later met in US, they spoke in German). Struve also acknowledged that he had no experience in spectral astrophysics. Nevertheless, when applying for his position, Frost mentioned that "I am perfectly willing to take him on his lineage. We regard Otto Struve as a first-class spectroscopist and astrophysicist", and that his degree in Kharkov was equivalent to a doctoral degree (which Struve never claimed and which was hardly so). It took several months to arrange for travel documents and funding. In late August 1921, Struve received his visa and travel tickets at the US Consulate in Turkey. In September, he boarded S.S. Hog Island and on October 7, 1921, arrived in New York. He was met there, put on the train, and two days later arrived in Chicago.

== Life in the United States ==
In late 1921, Struve began working as a stellar spectroscopy assistant at Yerkes with a monthly salary of $75, starting with taking a training course. The observatory was in decline and Struve was alone in class. Three more students joined him in 1922, but only for a summer, and only one of those continued later. There were no lectures, and the students were learning by reading, practice and discussions with professors.

Struve proved to be a quick learner and talented scientist. Five months after arrival, he made his first discovery of a pulsating star at Gamma Ursae Minoris and wrote an article on it in September 1922. He was spending more time with observations than anyone at Yerkes, trying every telescope available there, and also making weather observations at Williams Bay. On October 24, 1922, he discovered the asteroid 991 McDonalda and on November 14 of the same year, another asteroid 992 Swasey.

As early as December 1923, Struve defended his PhD thesis on short-period spectroscopic double stars at the University of Chicago. Frost helped him in waiving some required PhD examinations, e.g. in French and German, stating that Struve had done ample reading of scientific literature back in Russia, and was fluent in those languages. Struve then became an instructor (January 1924), assistant professor (1927) and full professor (1932) at the university. His rapid promotion was again assisted by Frost, who also used job-offer letters from other observatories to Struve as proof that Struve was a highly valued scientist who must be kept at the University of Chicago. Between 1932 and 1947, Struve headed Yerkes Observatory; from 1939 to 1950 he acted as a founding director of the McDonald Observatory, and from July 1, 1952, to 1962 served as the first director of the National Radio Astronomy Observatory at University of Virginia. All those years, he remained in America except for conferences and an 8-month sabbatical leave to the University of Cambridge between August 1928 and May 1929. He applied for and won a Guggenheim Fellowship to cover his travel to, and living expenses in, Cambridge. While in Cambridge, Struve mostly worked on interstellar matter; he also went on a short trip to Leiden to meet Jan Oort.

Struve was a highly successful administrator who brought fame to Yerkes Observatory and rebuilt the astronomy department of the University of Chicago. In particular, he gradually renewed the scientific staff, dismissing stagnated permanent researchers who were not making significant contributions to science but were occupying the faculty positions. The process was difficult. Struve used to arrive first and leave last from the observatory, taking notes on working hours of staff which he then used in his bureaucratic moves. In replacement, he hired several young and talented researchers who later became world-famous scientists. Those included Subrahmanyan Chandrasekhar (Nobel Prize in Physics in 1983), Gerard Kuiper (protagonist of the famous Kuiper Prize), Bengt Strömgren, Gerhard Herzberg (Nobel Prize in Chemistry in 1971), William Wilson Morgan and Jesse L. Greenstein. After World War II, he also invited a number of leading European researchers, such as Pol Swings, Jan Oort (father of radio astronomy), Marcel Minnaert, H. C. van der Hulst and Albrecht Unsöld. As most of them were foreigners, their appointment met strong opposition from the science officials for various reasons, such as taking jobs from Americans during the Great Depression. India-born Chandrasekhar, who spent a month in the Soviet Union in 1934, was also suspected of Communist connections. Struve spent extraordinary efforts defending and justifying each case, and those efforts paid off in building the scientific school at Yerkes and University of Chicago. For example, Chandrasekhar spent his entire career as a scientist and administrator at the University of Chicago, assisting Struve and eventually replacing him as president of the American Astronomical Society (from 1949) and as the Editor in Chief of the Astrophysical Journal.

By the late 1940s, many young researchers whom Struve invited to Yerkes became established scientists. This created friction, as they did not want to follow his every word and were building their own careers. In 1947, Struve resigned as director of Yerkes Observatory and became chairman of the astronomy department at the University of California, Berkeley and director of the Leuschner Observatory. He was succeeded by Kuiper at Yerkes; their relations were strained at times because of Struve's tendencies to keep control of Yerkes management. There were also rumors of similar strains between Struve and Chandrasekhar, but they were always dispersed by the latter, who insisted that Struve always kept scientific relations with his colleagues above the administrative ones. One reason for Struve's move to Berkeley was his tiredness of bureaucracy. In Berkeley, he was spending more time with personal research and students than ever before.

== Research ==
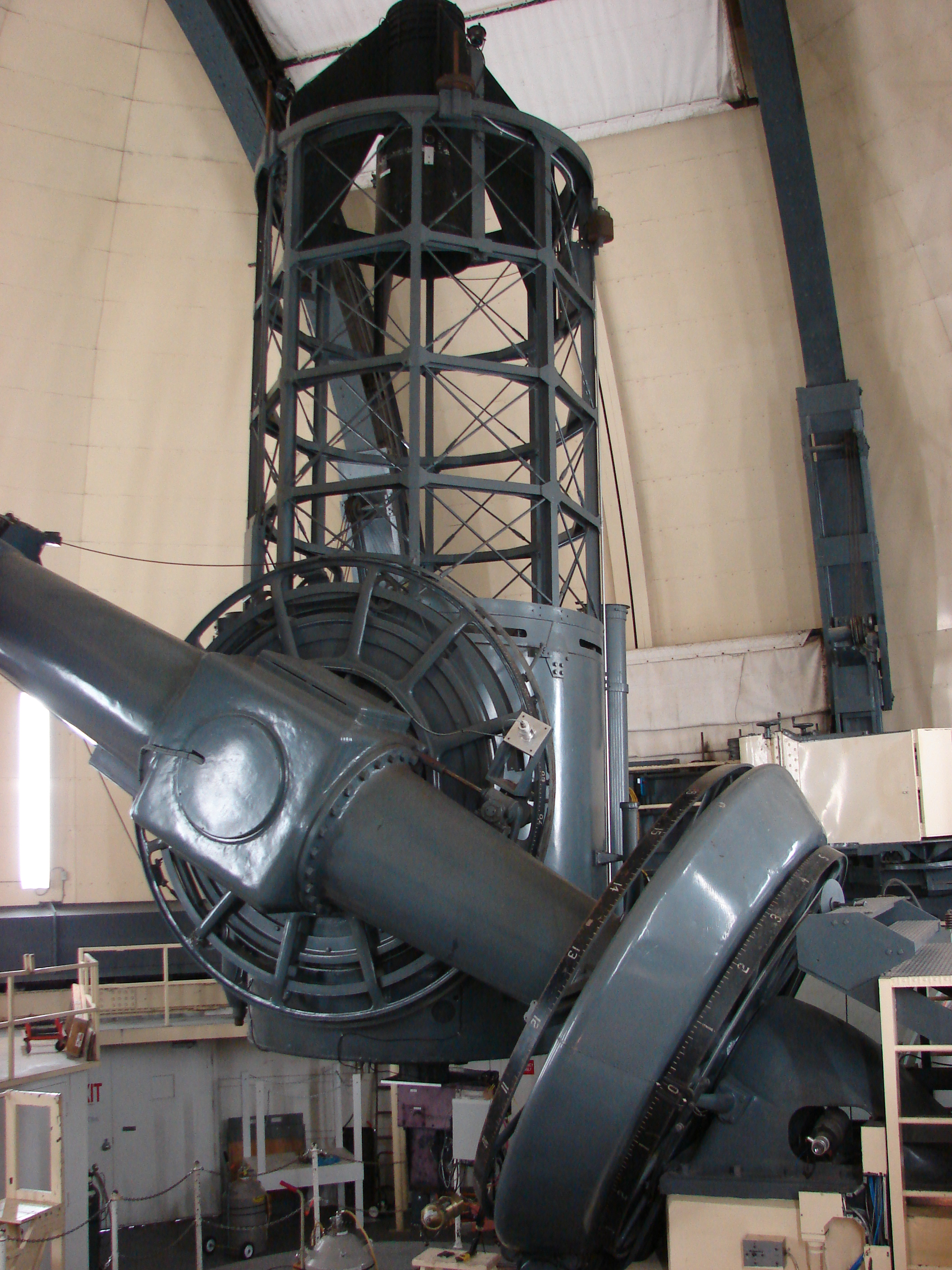
The 2.1 meter (82 inch) aperture Otto Struve telescope.

In 1937, Struve discovered a phenomenon which was later named the Struve-Sahade effect (S-S effect), that is the apparent weakness of lines of the secondary star in massive binary stars when the secondary is receding. This effect poses problems for the accurate reconstruction of the separated primary and secondary spectra. The same year, he discovered interstellar hydrogen in ionized form.

By 1959, Struve had published more than 900 journal articles and books, making him one of the most prolific astronomers (probably only Ernst Öpik published more, with 1,094 items). Many of those works aimed at popularizing astronomy. In particular, he published 39 articles (and 10 other items) in Popular Astronomy (1923–1951, the journal was discontinued in 1951), 154 in Sky and Telescope (1941–1963, the journal was started in 1941) and 83 reviews of books and works by other astronomers. Most of his co-authored scientific articles were co-authored with Pol Swings and were dedicated to spectroscopical studies of peculiar stars. To explain his interest in this topic, Struve once noted that he had never seen a spectrum of a star where he couldn't find anything to work on.

Struve's major discoveries were detection of stellar rotation and dependence of the rotational speed on the stellar spectral class (temperature). They spurred the development of stellar evolution theory. In addition to stellar rotation, he also studied Stark effect in stellar spectra, that is broadening of the spectral lines by the electric field in the stellar atmosphere. He also worked on the turbulence of stellar atmosphere and expanding shells around stars. This topic required a larger telescope than those available to him. Therefore, between 1933 and 1939, he built an 82-inch telescope at the McDonald Observatory, which was then the second largest telescope in the world (after the Mt. Wilson 100-inch (2.5 m) telescope).

== Views on extraterrestrial life ==
Struve's belief in the widespread existence of life and intelligence in the Universe stemmed from his studies of slow-rotating stars. Many stars, including the Sun, spin at a much lower rate than was predicted by contemporary theories of early stellar evolution. The reason for this, claimed Struve, was that they were surrounded by planetary systems which had carried away much of the stars' original angular momentum. So numerous were the slow-spinning stars that Struve estimated, in 1960, there might be as many as 50 billion planets in our Galaxy alone. As to how many might harbor intelligent life, he wrote:

An intrinsically improbable event may become highly probable if the number of events is very great. ... [I]t is probable that a good many of the billions of planets in the Milky Way support intelligent forms of life. To me this conclusion is of great philosophical interest. I believe that science has reached the point where it is necessary to take into account the action of intelligent beings, in addition to the classical laws of physics.

== Personal life, family relations, and late years ==
Struve had a younger brother and two sisters, all of whom died in Russia in their youth: Werner (1903–1920), Yadviga (1901–1924) and Elizabeth (1911–1920). The last death in 1924 left his mother with no close relatives in Russia. After Struve arranged visa documents, she immigrated to the US in January 1925. Remarkably, his mother began working in astronomy in the US and assisted in processing of the measurements. She lived with Struve even after his marriage.

On May 25, 1925, Struve married Mary Martha Lanning, who considered herself a musician but worked as a secretary at Yerkes. Lanning was slightly older than Struve and had been previously married. They had no children; thus the famous Struve astronomical dynasty came to an end. Other branches of the Struve family besides the line of Otto Wilhelm von Struve continued, but yielded no distinguished scientists. On October 26, 1927, Struve became a naturalized US citizen. At that time, he was fluent in spoken and written English, but had a slight German accent which remained with him for life. Even after marriage, Struve continued working days and nights, something that his non-scientist wife could not fully accept. Although they remained together, their relations were cold in later years. Struve's health deteriorated in the late 1950s. He was suffering from hepatitis, first contracted back in Russia and Turkey. In 1956, while using a telescope at Mount Wilson, Struve had a bad fall, breaking several ribs and cracking two vertebrae. He was hospitalized for about two months and had to wear a body cast for a month after recovery. He was permanently hospitalized around 1963 and died on April 6, 1963, in Berkeley. He was survived by his mother and wife. His mother died on October 1, 1964, at the age of ninety. Mary was discovered dead on August 5, 1966, but was estimated to have died in July 1966.

In 1925, Struve met his cousin, the astronomer Georg Hermann Struve at the Lick Observatory. In 1930s, they met again at Yerkes Observatory and reanalyzed observations of the complex multiple star system Zeta Cancri by their grandfather Otto Wilhelm von Struve.

== Personal qualities ==
Struve was often described as a big and intimidating man. According to him, in his fifties, he was six feet tall, weighed 192 pounds, had gray hair and eyes. Struve was also known as persistent, dedicated and demanding, both to himself and others – the qualities preserved in his family for generations. He was first to arrive at the observatory, often working until late evening in the office, and then spending nights with a telescope. "He had only one interest and concern, namely, that astronomy should be developed and pushed to the maximum that was possible". As a result, Struve was usually overworked, developed an insomnia and often appeared as in a daze after a 2–3 hour sleep.

Struve was hardly a good teacher: because of his devotion to research and frequent trips, he missed up to two-thirds of his lectures. Nobody was allowed to take his place and students had to do personal research in his absence. Yet, he kept the highest standards of knowledge at the qualifying exams. On the other hand, his infrequent appearances magnetized many students with his passion to astronomy. During his early years at Yerkes, he developed the practice of looking with one eye into the microscope of a micrograph instrument and with another at the nearby numerical table. This probably resulted in his eyes looking into slightly different directions.

Although he did not care much about himself, Struve worried about people. His first paper published in Russian was titled "Aid to Russian Scientists". The Civil War brought suffering to most scientific families in Russia. Frost, Struve and George Van Biesbroeck formed a "Committee for Relief of Russian Astronomers" and organized sending packages of food and clothing. The funds and clothing came from astronomers from all over the US.

During the Great Depression, he was concerned about hiring foreigners when many Americans were jobless. Around that time, the wife of his deputy George Van Biesbroeck wrote a letter to Belgium, mentioning how Yerkes Observatory was being run by two Europeans. The letter was published and it upset Struve. Eventually, Van Biesbroeck was replaced by American-born W. W. Morgan.

== Awards and honors ==
Struve was elected to both the United States National Academy of Sciences and the American Philosophical Society in 1937. He was elected to the American Academy of Arts and Sciences in 1942. He received the Gold Medal of the Royal Astronomical Society (1944), the Bruce Medal (1948), the Henry Draper Medal of the National Academy of Sciences (1949) and the Henry Norris Russell Lectureship of the American Astronomical Society (1957). His Royal Society medal was the fourth (after Friedrich Georg Wilhelm, Otto Wilhelm and Hermann Struve) and the last received by Struves. The asteroid 768 Struveana was named in honor of Otto Wilhelm von Struve, Friedrich Georg Wilhelm Struve and Karl Hermann Struve; and a lunar crater was named for another 3 astronomers of the Struve family: Friedrich Georg Wilhelm, Otto Wilhelm and Otto. The 82-inch telescope which Struve used in his research at McDonald Observatory was named after him in 1966, three years after his death, whereas the asteroid 2227 Otto Struve bore Struve's name from its discovery on October 13, 1955.

In 1925, Struve began reviewing articles for the Astrophysical Journal and from 1932 to 1947, acted as its Editor in Chief. From 1946 till 1949 he was president of American Astronomical Society. Between 1948 and 1952, he was vice-president and between 1952 and 1955 president of the International Astronomical Union. In April, 1954 he was elected a Fellow of the Royal Society. Also in 1954, he was awrded the Prix Jules Janssen by the Société astronomique de France. In 1950 he became foreign member of the Royal Netherlands Academy of Arts and Sciences. Between 1939 and 1961, he received honorary doctorate degrees from nine universities in Europe and America.

== See also ==
- Strömgren sphere

== Literature ==
- Балышев М.А. Отто Людвигович Струве (1897-1963). Москва: Наука, 2008. 526 с.
- Artemenko T., Balyshev M., Vavilova I. The struve dynasty in the history of astronomy in Ukraine. Kinematics and Physics of Celestial Bodies. 2009. Vol. 25 (3). P. 153-167.
- Балышев М.А. Из истории Харьковской обсерватории: биографические очерки. В Кн.: 200 лет астрономии в Харьковском университете / Под. ред. проф. Ю.Г.Шкуратова. Харьков: Издательский центр ХНУ имени В.Н.Каразина, 2008. С. 99-154.
- Балишев М.А. Наукова біографія академіка О.Л.Струве: проблеми відтворення, аналіз бібліографії та джерел (2008). Наука і наукознавство. 2008. №2. С. 111-120.
- Балышев М.А. Sic transit gloria mundi: Жизнь и творчество Отто Людвиговича Струве (1897-1963). Историко-астрономические исследования / Институт истории естествознания и техники им. С.И. Вавилова РАН. Москва: Наука, 2007. Т.ХХХІІ. С. 138-206.
- Балышев М.А. Отто Людвигович Струве. Curriculum vitae: историко-биографическое исследование (2005). Харьков: СПДФО Яковлева, 2005. 150 с.
- Балышев М.А. Отто Людвигович Струве. Документально-биографический очерк. UNIVERSITATES. Наука и Просвещение. 2004. №3. С. 30-39.
