= Gleb Struve =

Russian poet and literary historian (1898–1985)

Gleb Petrovich Struve (Russian: Глеб Петрович Струве; 1 May 1898 – 4 June 1985) was a Russian poet and literary historian.

== Biography ==
Gleb Petrovich Struve was born on 1 May 1898. His father was the political theorist Peter Berngardovich Struve.

Struve came from St. Petersburg and joined the Volunteer Army in 1918. Later that year he fled to Finland, then to Britain, where he studied at the University of Oxford (Balliol College) until 1921. It was there that he met Vladimir Nabokov, with whom he remained on friendly terms and corresponded until the novelist's death.

Between 1921 and 1924 Struve worked as a journalist in Berlin; and until 1932 in Paris.

In 1932 Struve replaced D. S. Mirsky at the University College London's (UCL) School of Slavonic Studies.

Later he moved to the University of California, Berkeley, in the United States.

Struve's publications number around 900, including editions of works by Russian authors suppressed in the Soviet Union, such as Anna Akhmatova, Nikolai Gumilev, Marina Tsvetayeva, and Osip Mandelstam. As an editor, he frequently collaborated with Russian born editor Boris Filippov.

Struve died on 4 June 1985 in Oakland, California.

The writer Nikita Struve was the son of his brother Aleksey and therefore Gleb's nephew.
