= Heinrich Wilhelm von Struve =

Russian chemist (1822–1908)

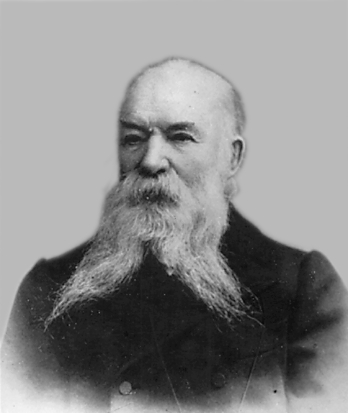
Portait, c. 1900

Heinrich Wilhelm von Struve (Russian: Генрих Васильевич Струве, romanized: Genrikh Vasilyevich Struve; 10 July 1822 – 28 March 1908) was a Russian chemist of Baltic German descent. He was from the Struve family and a member of the Russian Academy of Sciences.

== Early life ==
Struve was born in 1822 in Dorpat in the Russian Empire (present-day Estonia). His father was the Russian astronomer Friedrich Georg Wilhelm Struve (1793–1864), of German origin. Bernhard Wilhelm Struve (1827–1889), the governor of Astrakhan and Perm, was his brother. The German mathematician and pedagogue Jacob Struve (1755–1841) was his grandfather.

== Career ==
In 1845, he graduated from the Imperial University of Dorpat and continued working there in the field of chemistry until 1849. In 1846, via arrangement by his father Friedrich Georg Wilhelm von Struve, Genrikh spent a month visiting Jöns Jacob Berzelius who was impressed with both the father and his son.

In 1849, Struve moved to the Mineralogy Department in Saint Petersburg and worked there until 1867. In 1867, he became a criminal medicine expert in Tiflis. There, he used not only chemical, but also early photographical (1885) methods for criminal analysis. He had also participated in the chemical analysis of mineral springs of the area, in particular of the Matsesta spring in Sochi in 1886.

Struve married Pauline Fuss, a great-granddaughter of Leonhard Euler.

Struve's scientific work was mostly related to inorganic and analytical chemistry. In 1853, he published first in Russia tables for evaluating chemical analyses. The same year, he suggested use of ammonium molybdate for detection of arsenic in criminal medicine and in mineral analysis, such as indicating traces of arsenic in antimony. He also synthesized a range of double salts of potassium, sodium, chromium, iron, aluminium, molybdenum and tungsten. In 1876, Struve became a member of the Russian Academy of Sciences.
