= Friedrich Georg Wilhelm von Struve =

Baltic German astronomer and geodesist (1793–1864)

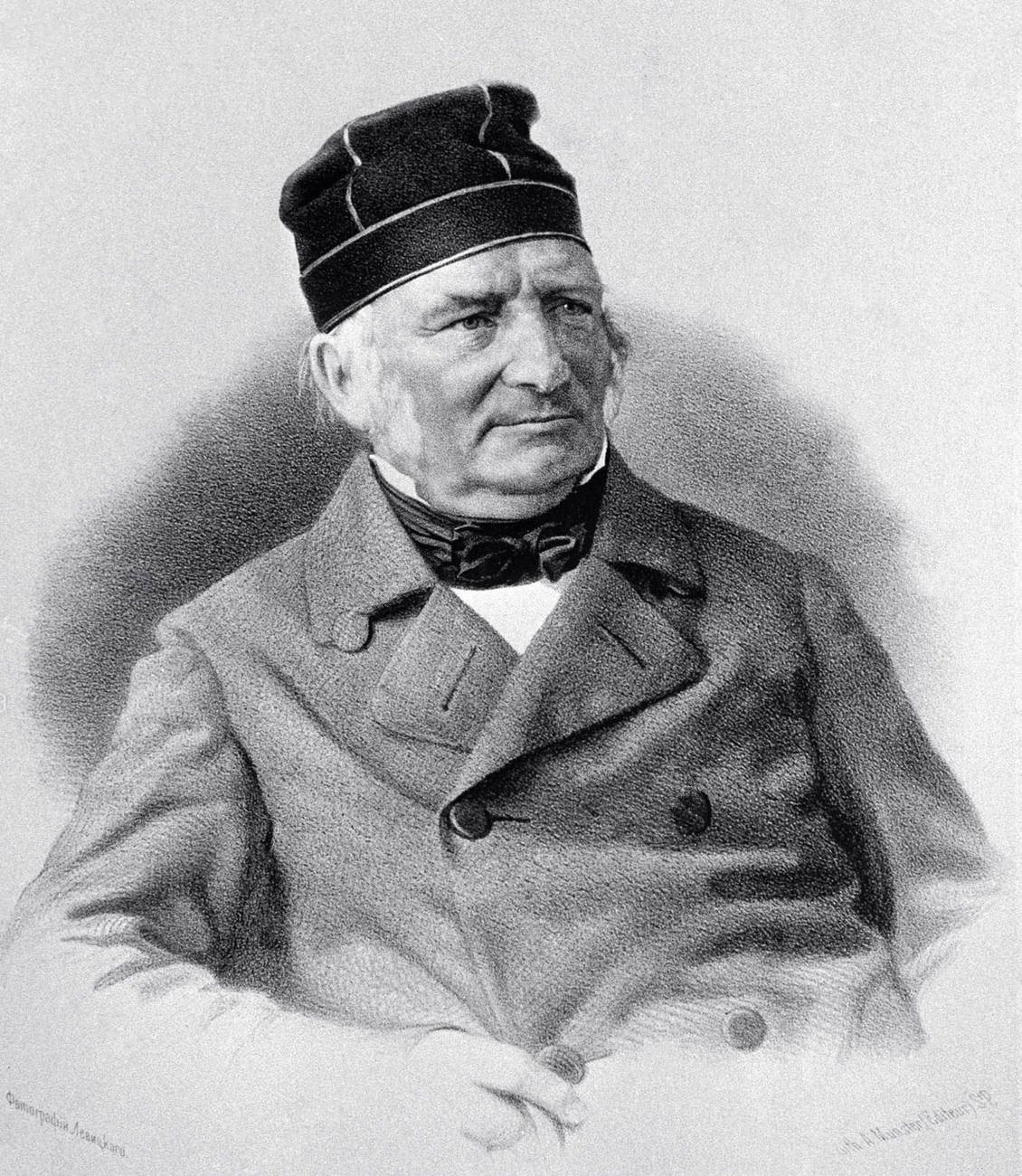
- Von Struve
- Born: 15 April 1793; Altona, Duchy of Holstein
- Died: 23 November 1864 (aged 71); St Petersburg, Russian Empire
- Citizenship: Danish, Russian
- Education: Imperial University of Dorpat
- Awards: Gold Medal of the Royal Astronomical Society (1826); Royal Medal (1827)
- Scientific career
- Fields: Astronomy, geodesy

Friedrich Georg Wilhelm von Struve (Russian: Василий Яковлевич Струве, romanized: Vasily Yakovlevich Struve; 15 April 1793 – 23 November [O.S. 11 November] 1864) was a Russian astronomer and geodesist of Baltic German origin. He is best known for studying double stars and initiating a triangulation survey later named Struve Geodetic Arc in his honor.

== Life ==
He was born to the aristocratic Struve family at Altona, Duchy of Holstein (then a part of the Denmark–Norway kingdoms), the son of Jacob Struve (1755–1841). To avoid military service during the French occupation of Holstein, his family moved to the Russian Empire, equipped with Danish passports.

In 1808 he entered the Imperial University of Dorpat, where he first studied philology, but soon turned his attention to astronomy. From 1813 to 1820, he taught at the university and collected data at the Dorpat Observatory, and in 1820 became a full professor and director of the observatory. His teachings had an effect still felt at the university.

Struve was occupied with research on double stars and geodesy in Dorpat until 1839, when he founded and became director of the new Pulkovo Observatory near St Petersburg. Among other honors, he won the Gold Medal of the Royal Astronomical Society in 1826. He was elected a Fellow of the Royal Society in March 1827 and was awarded their Royal Medal the same year. Struve was elected a member of the Royal Swedish Academy of Sciences in 1833, and a Foreign Honorary Member of the American Academy of Arts and Sciences in 1834. In 1839 he became the founder and first director of the Pulkovo Observatory near Saint Petersburg. In 1843 he formally adopted Russian nationality. He retired in 1862 due to failing health.

The asteroid 768 Struveana was named jointly in his honour and that of Otto Wilhelm and Karl Hermann Struve, and a lunar crater was named for another three astronomers of the Struve family: Friedrich Georg Wilhelm, Otto Wilhelm and Otto. In 1969 the Friedrich Georg Wilhelm Struve Monument was established on Toome Hill, Tartu.

== Works ==
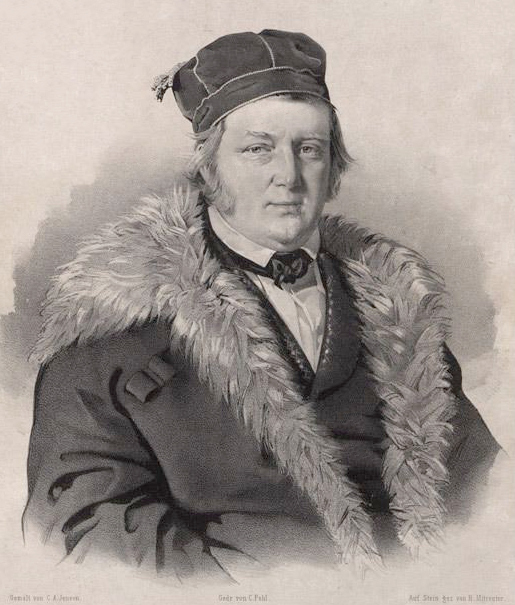
Friedrich Georg Wilhelm von Struve

Struve's name is best known for his observations of double stars, which he carried on for many years. Although double stars had been studied earlier by William Herschel, John Herschel and Sir James South, Struve outdid any previous efforts. While at Dorpat, he obtained in 1824 a refracting telescope with an aperture of 23 cm (about 9 inches) made by Joseph von Fraunhofer, said to be a masterpiece of optical and mechanical quality. With this telescope, Struve discovered a very large number of double stars. In 1827, he published his double star catalogue Catalogus novus stellarum duplicium. Stars of his catalogue are sometimes indicated by the Greek letter sigma, Σ. Thus, 61 Cygni is also designated as Σ2758.

Since most double stars are true binary stars rather than mere optical doubles (as William Herschel had been the first to discover), they orbit around their common barycenter, and slowly change position over the years. Thus, Struve made micrometric measurements of 2714 double stars from 1824 to 1837, and published these in his work Stellarum duplicium et multiplicium mensurae micrometricae.

Struve carefully measured the "constant of aberration" in 1843. He was also the first to measure the parallax of the star Vega, though Friedrich Bessel had been the first to measure the parallax of a star (61 Cygni).

In an 1847 work, Etudes d'Astronomie Stellaire: Sur la voie lactee et sur la distance des etoiles fixes, Struve was one of the first astronomers to identify the effects of interstellar extinction (though he provided no mechanism to explain the effect). His estimate of the average rate of visual extinction, 1 mag per kpc, is remarkably close to modern estimates (0.7–1.0 mag per kpc).

He was also interested in geodetic surveying, and in 1831 published Beschreibung der Breitengradmessung in den Ostseeprovinzen Russlands. He initiated the Struve Geodetic Arc, a chain of survey triangulations stretching from Hammerfest in Norway to the Black Sea, through ten countries and over 2,820 km, to establish the exact size and shape of the earth. UNESCO listed the chain on its List of World Heritage Sites in Europe in 2005.

In 1853, he was elected as a member of the American Philosophical Society.

== Family ==
Struve was the second of a dynasty of astronomers through five generations: he was the father of Otto Wilhelm von Struve, the grandfather of Hermann von Struve (Otto Struve's uncle), and the great-grandfather of Otto Struve.

In 1815, he married Emilie Wall (1796–1834) in Altona, who bore twelve children, eight of whom survived early childhood. In addition to Otto Wilhelm von Struve, other children were Heinrich Wilhelm von Struve (1822–1908), a prominent chemist, and Bernhard Wilhelm von Struve (1827–1889), who served as a government official in Siberia, and later as governor of Astrakhan and Perm.

After his first wife died, he remarried to Johanna Henriette Francisca Bartels (1807–1867), a daughter of the mathematician Martin Bartels, who bore him six more children. The most well-known was Karl von Struve (1835–1907), who served successively as Russian ambassador to Japan, the United States, and the Netherlands.

Bernhard Wilhelm's son Pyotr Struve (1870–1944) is probably the best-known member of the family in Russia proper (his other descendants mainly resided in Estonia and Latvia, and subsequently in Germany). He was one of the first Russian marxists and penned the manifesto of the Russian Social Democratic Labour Party upon its creation in 1898. Even before the party split into Bolsheviks and Mensheviks, Struve left it for the Constitutional Democratic party, which promoted ideas of liberalism. He represented this party at all the pre-revolutionary State Dumas. After the Russian Revolution, he published several striking articles on its causes and joined the White movement. He was one of the ministers in the governments of Pyotr Wrangel and Denikin. During the following three decades, Pyotr lived in Paris, while his children were prominent in the Russian Orthodox Church Outside of Russia.

== See also ==
- List of Russian astronomers and astrophysicists

== Sources ==
- "Струве, Василий Яковлевич" . Brockhaus and Efron Encyclopedic Dictionary (in Russian). 1906.
