= Otto Wilhelm von Struve =

Russian astronomer (1819–1905)

- Отто Васильевич Струве
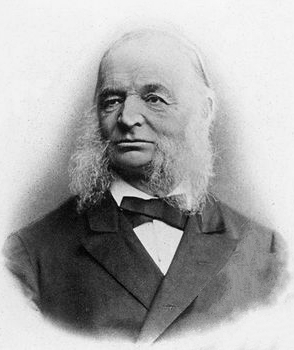
- Struve in 1900
- Born: May 7, 1819; Dorpat, Russian Empire
- Died: April 14, 1905 (aged 85); Karlsruhe, Germany
- Education: Imperial University of Dorpat
- Occupation: Astronomer
- Parents: Friedrich Georg Wilhelm von Struve (father); Emilie Wall (mother)

Otto Wilhelm von Struve (Russian: Отто Васильевич Струве, romanized: Otto Vasilyevich Struve; 7 May [O.S. 25 April] 1819 – April 14, 1905) was a Russian astronomer of Baltic German descent. He headed the Pulkovo Observatory between 1862 and 1889 and was a leading member of the Russian Academy of Sciences.

== Early years ==
Struve was born in 1819 in Dorpat (Tartu) in the Russian Empire as the third son out of eighteen sons and daughters of Friedrich Georg Wilhelm von Struve and Emilie Wall (1796–1834). He graduated from a Dorpat gymnasium at the age of 15 and was one year too young by the university rules. Nevertheless, he was admitted to the Imperial University of Dorpat as a listener and completed the program by the age of 20. While studying, he was assisting his father at the Dorpat Observatory. In 1839, he graduated from the university and moved to the newly opened Pulkovo Observatory, where he was immediately appointed as assistant of the director (his father). For his initial observations, he was given the degree of Master of Astronomy by the University of St. Petersburg in 1841. In 1842, he visited Lipetsk for observations of the solar eclipse and in 1843 defended his PhD. In 1843, Otto formally became a Russian subject.

== Scientific work ==
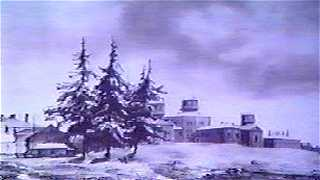
Pulkovo Observatory in 1839.

During 1843 and 1844, Struve participated in longitude measurements between Altona, Greenwich and Pulkovo, which were based on large displacement of chronometers over the Earth surface. This newly developed method was adopted in Russia, and from 1844, longitude was measured starting from Pulkovo Observatory instead of Tartu Observatory.

Struve dedicated much of 1844 to studying the Sun. He deduced its apex coordinates and linear velocity as 7.3 km/s. Although this was significantly smaller than the accurate value of 19.5 km/s measured in 1901, Struve was correct in that the velocity of the Sun was smaller than that of stars.

In 1865 Struve discovered NGC 8, a double star in the constellation Pegasus, and the spiral galaxy NGC 9 in the constellation Andromeda. He explored the constellation of Cassiopeia, finding double stars. He labeled them with his initials in the Greek alphabet, OΣ in his first catalogue, and OΣΣ in his appendix.

Struve continued his father's work in several directions. In particular, they compiled catalogues of stellar coordinates, including several thousands double stars observed with a 15-inch refractor. Between 1816 and 1852, the observatory completed survey triangulation measurements of the angular arc (named Struve Geodetic Arc). The measurements extended through over 2,820 km, from Hammerfest in Norway to the Staraya Nekrasovka village by the Black Sea, and aimed to establish the exact size and shape of the Earth.

In 1851, while observing a solar eclipse, Struve concluded that the solar corona and protuberances are physically connected with the Sun rather than being simply an optical effect, as most astronomers then believed. Later in 1860 he suggested a close connection between solar protuberances and flares. he also observed satellites of Uranus (Ariel and Umbriel, in 1851) and of Neptune. He measured the rings of Saturn and discovered (in parallel with other researchers) the dark inner ring of Saturn. In 1861, in his report to the Academy of Sciences, he supported and developed the ideas of William Herschel that stars are formed from the diffuse matter. In 1872, he organized assistance with equipment to the newly opened observatory in Tashkent – a more southerly location offering clear skies for observations. In 1874, he prepared several expeditions to monitor the transit of Venus across the solar disk in eastern Asia, Caucasus, Persia and Egypt. In 1887, he sent several groups within Russia to observe the solar eclipse. In some of those expeditions, he took part personally. In 1885, a 30-inch refracting telescope was installed at Pulkovo, at the time the largest in the world (see great refractor).

== International geodetic collaboration and adoption of the metre ==
It was not until 1954 that the connection of the southerly extension of the Struve Geodetic Arc, a chain of survey triangulations stretching from Hammerfest in Norway to the Black Sea, with an arc running northwards from South Africa through Egypt would bring the course of a major meridian arc back to land where Eratosthenes had founded geodesy.

The Struve Geodetic arc measurement extended on a period of forty years and initiated an international scientific collaboration between Russian Empire and the United Kingdoms of Sweden and Norway with the involvement of proeminent astronomers such as Friedrich Georg Wilhelm von Struve, Friedrich Wilhelm Bessel, Carl Friedrich Gauss and George Biddell Airy. A French scientific instrument maker, Jean Nicolas Fortin, made three direct copies of the Toise of Peru, one for Friedrich Georg Wilhelm von Struve, a second for Heinrich Christian Schumacher in 1821 and a third for Friedrich Wilhelm Bessel in 1823. In 1831, Henri-Prudence Gambey also realised a copy of the Toise of Peru which was kept at Altona Observatory. In continental Europe, except Spain, surveyors continued to use measuring instruments calibrated on the Toise of Peru. Among these, the toise of Bessel and the apparatus of Borda were respectively the main references for geodesy in Prussia and in France. These measuring devices consisted of bimetallic rulers in platinum and brass or iron and zinc fixed together at one extremity to assess the variations in length produced by any change in temperature. The combination of two bars made of two different metals allowed to take thermal expansion into account without measuring the temperature.

In 1858, a Technical Commission was set up to continue cadastral surveying inaugurated under Muhammad Ali. This Commission suggested to buy geodetic devices which were ordered in France. Mohammed Sa'id Pasha entrusted to Ismail Mustafa al-Falaki the study of the precision apparatus calibrated against the metre intended to measure geodetic baselines and built by Jean Brunner in Paris. Ismail Mustafa had the task to carry out the experiments necessary for determining the expansion coefficients of the two platinum and brass bars, and to compare the Egyptian standard with a known standard. The Spanish standard designed by Carlos Ibáñez e Ibáñez de Ibero and Frutos Saavedra Meneses was chosen for this purpose, as it had served as a model for the construction of the Egyptian standard.

In 1869, the Saint Petersburg Academy of Sciences sent to the French Academy of Sciences a report drafted by Otto Wilhelm von Struve, who secured, in 1860, the co-operation of Prussia, Belgium, France and England to the measurement of the European arc of parallel in 52° latitude, Heinrich von Wild, the Swiss born director of the Central Geophysical Observatory in Saint Petersburg, and Moritz von Jacobi, whose theorem has long supported the assumption of an ellipsoid with three unequal axes for the figure of the Earth, inviting his French counterpart to undertake joint action to ensure the universal use of the metric system in all scientific work. The French Academy of Sciences and the Bureau des Longitudes in Paris drew the attention of the French government to this issue. In November 1869, Napoleon III issued invitations to join the International Metre Commission in which Russia was represented by Struve, von Wild and von Jacobi.

== Administration ==
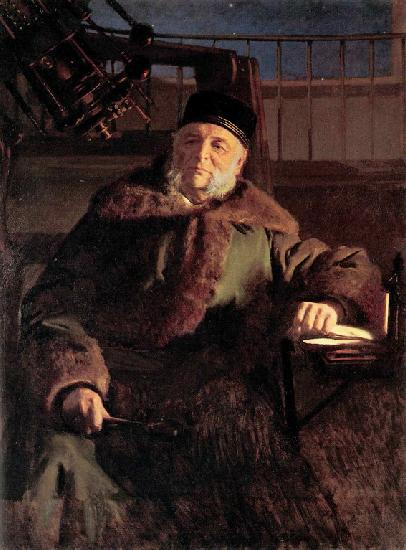
1886 portrait of Struve by Ivan Kramskoi.

Around 1845, von Struve's father withdrew from most management activities at the Pulkovo Observatory and focused on individual research. From then on, most administrative duties fell on von Struve, especially in 1858 when his father was gravely ill. With his father's retirement in 1862, Otto officially became director and kept that position for 27 years until 1889. In the mid-1860s, his own health deteriorated as well, to the point that neither he nor his physician hoped for recovery. However, instead of retiring, von Struve spent a full winter on leave in Italy and managed to restore his health.

Struve remained a top authority at the Russian Academy and his instructions regarding staff appointments were generally followed without question. The first refusal, in 1887, disappointed Struve so much that he applied for resignation. However, Tsar Alexander III requested him to remain in his posts until the 50th anniversary of the Pulkovo Observatory in 1889.

For most of those years, the working language of the Pulkovo Observatory was German, as the staff members were largely foreigners. Struve had only limited command of Russian, although he used it whenever possible.

== Visit to the United States ==
Otto was the first scientist of the Struve family to visit United States (in 1879: New York, Chicago and San Francisco). The visit served several purposes, including ordering the Alvan Clark & Sons optics for the new 30-inch telescope in Pulkovo, and it was a part of long-term Russian-American partnership in astronomy during the 19th century. Within that collaboration, many American astronomers stayed at Pulkovo for observations and exchanged data with Russian scientists by mail. By the initiative of Struve, two American astronomers, Simon Newcomb and Asaph Hall were appointed as Foreign Members of the Russian Academy of Sciences.

== Personal life and late years ==
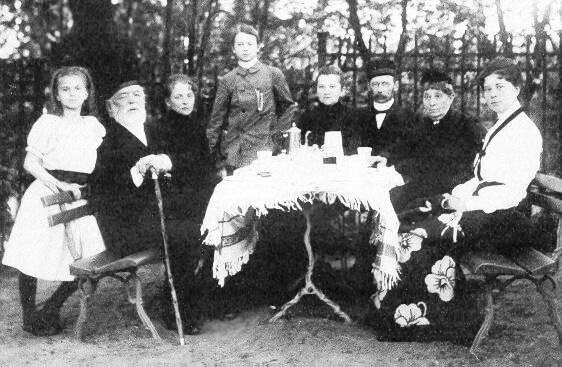
Struve (second left) with his family. Hermann von Struve is third from the right.

Struve was married twice. His first wife was a daughter of German emigrants Emilie Dyrssen (1823–1868). They had four sons and two daughters who reached mature age. A few years after her death, Struve married Emma Jankowsky (1839–1902) and had another daughter with her. Two of his younger sons, Hermann Struve and Ludwig Struve, continued the traditions of the Struve family and became distinguished astronomers. Of the older sons, one served at the Ministry of Finances and another was geologist. After retirement in 1889, Otto Wilhelm Struve stayed mostly in St. Petersburg, summarizing his observations and keeping correspondence with colleagues. He occasionally visited Switzerland and Italy. During his 1895 trip to Germany, he fell ill to the point of abandoning any further travel. He stayed in Germany and died in 1905 in Karlsruhe.

== Awards and honors ==
Struve won the Gold Medal of the Royal Astronomical Society in 1850 for his work on "The Determination of the Constant of Precession with respect to the Proper Motion of the Solar System" published in 1840 . He was a member of the Royal Swedish Academy of Sciences. Between 1852 and 1889, he was also a member of the Russian Academy of Sciences and became an academician in 1856. In 1874 he became foreign member of the Royal Netherlands Academy of Arts and Sciences. The asteroid 768 Struveana was named in honor of Otto Wilhelm, Friedrich Georg Wilhelm and Karl Hermann Struve; and a lunar crater was named for another three astronomers of the Struve family: Friedrich Georg Wilhelm, Otto Wilhelm and Otto. The Struve Geodetic Arc was included in the World Heritage List in 2005.

== Selected works ==
- "Ueber die Verdienste Peter's des Grossen um die Kartographie Russlands" [On the Merits of Peter the Great in the Cartography of Russia]. Russische Revue (in German). 8: 1–19. January 1876.

== See also ==
- History of the metre
- Seconds pendulum

== Sources ==
- "Струве, Отто Васильевич" . Brockhaus and Efron Encyclopedic Dictionary (in Russian). 1906.
