= Nikita Struve =

French author and translator (1931-2016)

Nikita Alexeyevich Struve (Russian: Никита Алексеевич Струве; 16 February 1931 – 7 May 2016) was a French author and translator of Russian descent, specializing in the study of Russian émigrés.

== Biography ==
Struve was born in Boulogne-Billancourt, a suburb of Paris, into the Struve family. He was the grandson of Peter Berngardovich Struve and the son of Aleksey Petrovich Struve (d. 1976), founder of a Russian library at Paris.

Struve graduated from and taught Russian at the Sorbonne in the 1950s. In 1963, he published a book on the history of the Church under the Soviet regime, Les chrétiens en URSS, which was translated into 5 languages. In 1979 Struve defended his doctoral dissertation on Osip Mandelstam (published in French, then - in the author's translation in Russian). In the same year he became a full professor at the University of Paris X (Nanterre), and later head of the Department of Slavic Studies.

In 1978 he headed the Russian section of the YMCA Press publisher. In 1991 he opened the publishing house "Russian way" in Moscow. He translated into French the poetry of Pushkin, Lermontov, Afanasy Fet, Akhmatova and other Russian poets. In 1996 he wrote the fundamental study "70 years of the Russian emigration". He was a member of the Board of Trustees of the St. Filaret Orthodox Christian Institute, Professor of the University of Paris-Nanterre, Chief editor of Bulletin of Russian Christian Movement magazine and Le messager orthodoxe.

A great influence on Struve as a researcher of the history of Russian culture was his private familiarity with Ivan Bunin, Alexei Remizov, Boris Zaitsev, Semyon Frank, Anna Akhmatova and Aleksandr Solzhenitsyn.

== Family ==
Struve was married to Maria Alexandrovna Struve (1925-2020); they had three children, Daniel Struve (born 1959), Blandine Lopoukhine (born 1959) and Melanie Rakovitch (born 1963) .

== Awards ==
- Pushkin Medal - 2008, for achievements in Franco-Russian relations in culture and education
- State Prize of the Russian Federation for literature and the arts; 1999
- Medal of the Russian Commissioner for Human Rights; 2011

== Works ==
=== French language ===
- Les chrétiens en URSS. — Paris: Seuil, 1963. — 374 p. (2-e ed.: Paris, 1964. — 428 p.)
- Anthologie de la poésie russe. La Renaissance du XXe siècle. Introduction, choix, traduction et notes. — Paris, 1970. — 254 p. (2-e ed.: Paris, 1991).
- Ossip Mandelstam: la voix, l'idée, le destin. — Paris, 1982. — 302 p.
- Anthologie de la poésie russe du XIXe siècle. Introduction, choix, traduction et notes. — Paris, 1994. — 260 p.
- Soixante-dix ans d'émigration russe (1919–1989). — Paris, 1996. — 302 p.

=== Russian language ===
- Осип Мандельштам. — Лондон, 1988. — 336 с. (2-е изд.: Лондон, 1990; 3-е изд.: Томск, 1992; 4-е изд.: М., 2011).
- Православие и культура. — М.: Христианск. изд-во, 1992. — 337 с. (2-е изд., испр. и доп.: М.: Русский путь, 2000. — 632 с.)
