= Vasily Struve (historian) =

Russian orientalist (1889–1965)

Vasily Struve

Vasily Vasilievich Struve (Russian: Василий Васильевич Струве; 2 February [O.S. 21 January] 1889 in Petersburg, Russian Empire – September 15, 1965 in Leningrad) was a Soviet orientalist from the Struve family, the founder of the Soviet scientific school of researchers on Ancient Near East history.

In 1907 he entered the Department of History at the Faculty of History and Philology of the Petersburg University, where he studied the Ancient Greek and Latin languages, and Ancient Egyptian language under the leadership of the famous Russian Egyptologist Boris Turaev. He became proficient in all types of Egyptian hieroglyphic writing, including Demotic. He graduated from the Petersburg University in 1911 and continued research work and lecturing at the university until 1913, when he left for Germany for profound studies of the Egyptian language under Adolf Erman. During the Russian entry into World War I he changed his name from Wilhelm Wilhelminovich Struve to Vasily Vasilievich Struve. After returning to Russia he became a private docent of the Petersburg university in 1916 and a professor there in 1920. He was the head of the Hermitage Department for Art and Culture of Egypt from 1918 to 1933. Already being a lecturer he began to study Akkadian language, Biblical Hebrew and other Semitic languages under the Russian Semitologist academician Pavel Kokovtsov. Struve also began to study Sumerian language on his own.

In 1928 Struve defended the dissertation Manetho and His Time for the Master's Degree in history. He received the Doctor of Science degree honoris causa. In 1935 Struve, nominated by Pavel Kokovtsov, was elected the full member of the USSR Academy of Sciences, becoming an academician. From 1937 to 1940, he was a Head of the USSR Academy of Sciences Ethnography Institute, from 1941 to 1950 a Head of the Academy Institute of Oriental Studies, and from 1959 a Head of the Ancient East department of the latter Institute.

Struve was a pioneer of research that replaced positivist historical research with a Marxist approach and took far-reaching changes in social and economic structures into account.

Struve authored around 400 scientific works in his lifetime. He along with Boris Turaev worked on the Moscow Mathematical Papyrus and published its translation in 1930. As an Egyptologist he translated and published numerous Demotic documents from fonds of museums of the USSR. But his scientific research field was not limited to Egyptology. His major scientific works were also on the history and history of arts of Sumer, Babylonia, Assyria, the Hittite Empire and other civilizations of the Ancient Near East. He authored numerous research papers and textbooks in these fields, including the generalizing work "History of [the] Ancient East" (1941). Struve was the head of a large research team that began work on the publication of all Greek inscriptions from the Ancient Bosporan Kingdom. He also published a work on the history of the Ancient Northern Black Sea Coast, Caucasus and Middle Asian civilizations.
