= Jacob Struve =

German mathematician (1755–1841)

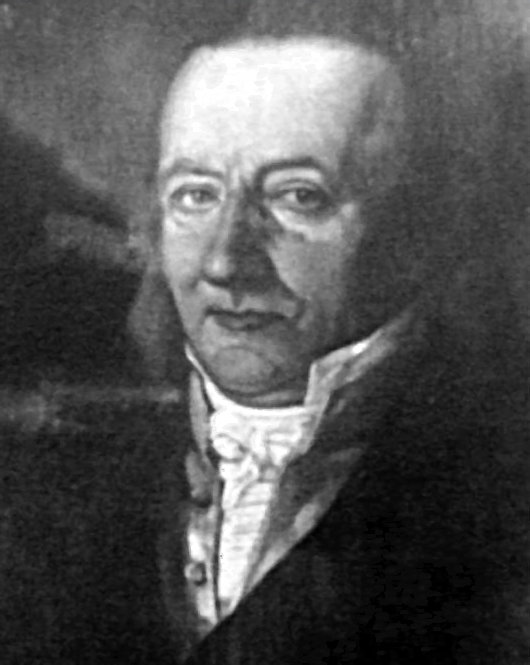
Jacob Struve

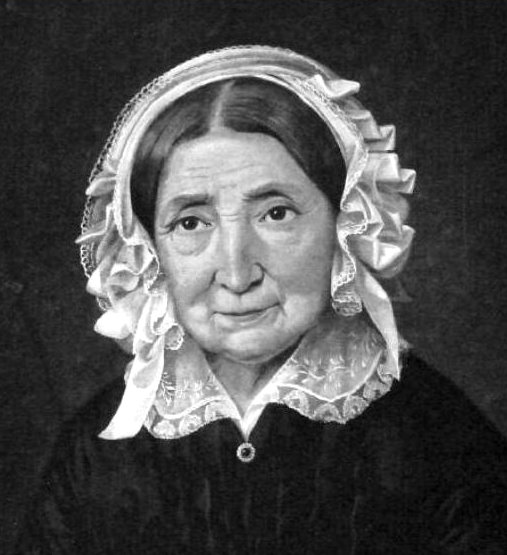
Maria Emerentia Struve

Jacob Struve (also Jakob Struve; November 21, 1755 – April 2, 1841) was a German mathematician and father of the astronomer Friedrich Georg Wilhelm von Struve.

== Early life and education ==
Jacob Struve was born in 1755, in Horst, Holstein. He was the youngest of the four children of Johann Struve (1710 – February 20, 1778) and Abel Strüven (November 23, 1719 – November 18, 1762). From a young age he had to work in the fields, but he also received lessons in Latin, German, English and in mathematics, which he liked most. From 1771 till 1775 he studied at the Christianeum High School in Altona, then part of both Denmark and Germany. Starting from 1775, he entered the University of Göttingen (some sources say he studied at the University of Kiel), and attended mathematics lectures of Abraham Gotthelf Kästner, which were rather popular among students, including Struve. In 1780, through the assistance of one of his teachers, Christian Gottlob Heyne, Struve obtained a position of vice-principal in a Latin school in Hanover. In 1783, he became a school principal in Bückeburg and from 1784 held the same position in Hanover.

== Career ==
Carl went into his father's footsteps and served as a school director in Königsberg. Friedrich Georg Wilhelm became a distinguished astronomer. Ludwig graduated from the University of Kiel, obtained PhD degree in medicine and worked as anatomy professor at the University of Tartu.

Maria Emerentia was a daughter of Pastor Stinde, who went to Russia as a chaplain to Peter III. This might have affected further settlement of part of the Struve family in the Russian Empire (mostly in Tartu). In particular, many sons of Struve left Germany, likely to avoid recruitment to the Napoleonic armies.

In 1791, Struve became a professor at the Christianeum High School in Altona where he had graduated from, and from 1794 till his retirement in 1827 served as the school director. In the meantime, he continued his studies in the fields of algebra, geometry, probability theory and number theory, which were based on the works of Kästner, Leonhard Euler and Georg Simon Klügel. His results were published between 1800 and 1827 in more than 20 articles. In 1813, Struve obtained a doctoral degree from the University of Kiel. He died in 1841 in Altona leaving a family which produced prominent astronomers for 5 generations ahead.

His attitude to life could be expressed in a phrase from his letter to Friedrich:

A teneris adsuescere multum est. Wir Struve können nicht ohne anhaltende Arbeit vergnügt leben, weil wir von frühester Jugend an uns überzeugt haben, daß sie die nützlichste und beste Würze des Menschenlebens ist. (We, Struve, can not live happily without continuous work, because from the young age we learn that it is the most useful and best virtue of human life.)

== Family ==
In 1783, Struve married Maria Emerentia Wiese (September 8, 1764 – July 14, 1847) from Hamburg. They had five sons and two daughters:

- Carl Ludwig Struve (1785–1838)
- Ernst Struve (1786–1822)
- Gustav Struve (1788–1829)
- Christina Struve (1791–1853)
- Friedrich Georg Wilhelm von Struve (1793–1864)
- Ludwig Struve (1795–1828)
- Johanna Struve (1797–1871)
