= Faculty of Philosophy, University of Warsaw =

Division of the University of Warsaw

Faculty of Philosophy
- Wydział Filozofii
- Type: Faculty
- Established: 1 September 2020
- Parent institution: University of Warsaw
- Dean: Paweł Łuków
- Location: Krakowskie Przedmieście 3, Warsaw, 00-047, Poland
- Website: filozofia.uw.edu.pl

The Faculty of Philosophy (Polish: Wydział Filozofii) of the University of Warsaw is a faculty conducting study and research in fields of philosophy, cognitive science and bioethics. The faculty succeeded the Institute of Philosophy of the Faculty of Philosophy and Sociology, which was split in two independent faculties on 1 September 2020. The institution is renowned mainly for its contribution to the development of modern logic and analytic philosophy (Lvov-Warsaw School: Alfred Tarski, Jan Łukasiewicz, Kazimierz Ajdukiewicz, Tadeusz Kotarbiński, Stanisław Leśniewski) and to history of ideas (Warsaw School of the History of Ideas: Władysław Tatarkiewicz, Stanisław Ossowski, Maria Ossowska, Leszek Kołakowski, Adam Schaff).

== The 18th and 19th century ==
The main centre of the medieval and early modern Polish philosophy was Kraków - history of philosophy in Warsaw begins in the 18th century. In the pre-partition Varsovian institutions, the Collegium Nobilium and the Szkoła Rycerska to the lecturers of philosophy belonged Antoni Wiśniewski and Marcin Nikuta. In the 19th century, after the foundation of the University of Warsaw in 1815, due to russification of the schools Polish philosophy, both idealist and positivist, developed mainly outside universities. Among main Polish philosophers connected with the 19th century University of Warsaw were Adam Zabellewicz and Henryk Struve.

== Interwar period ==
After 1918, when Poland regained independence, University of Warsaw was reorganized. Chairs of philosophy were held by Jan Łukasiewicz, Władysław Tatarkiewicz, Tadeusz Kotarbiński, Stanisław Leśniewski, Kazimierz Ajdukiewicz and Stanislaw Schayer.

Initially, philosophical education were organized in the Faculty of Historical-Philosophical Studies (1915–16), soon transformed into the Faculty of Philosophical Studies (1916–27), and then into the Faculty of the Humanities (Tatarkiewicz, Kotarbiński and Schayer) and the Faculty of Mathematical Studies and Physics (Łukasiewicz, Leśniewski and Ajdukiewicz).

Other important philosophers teaching in Warsaw were Alfred Tarski, Henryk Elzenberg, Maria Ossowska and Stanisław Ossowski. Worldwide renown in logic and analytic philosophy was enjoyed by the Warsaw School of Logic, part of the philosophical movement of Lvov-Warsaw School.

During the German occupation of Warsaw secret courses of philosophy were conducted by Łukasiewicz, Tatarkiewicz, Kotarbiński and others.

== History after 1945 ==
After 1945, during the stalinist era, due to political predominance of Marxist philosophy in Poland some professors were partially prohibited from pursuing didactic activity. After the Polish October (1956) a separate Faculty of Philosophical Studies (1954–65) emerged from the Faculty of Arts and many leading philosophers were allowed to teach. It was subsequently transformed into the Faculty of Philosophical-Sociological Studies (1965–68).

In the 50s and 60s, the Warsaw School of the History of Ideas emerged. To this informal group of non-analytical philosophers belonged mainly former Marxists (called "revisionist"), inspired to some extent by the ideas of Tatarkiewicz and Ossowskis. After the Polish March (1968), when many "revisionist" Polish philosophers and sociologists (for example Leszek Kołakowski, Zygmunt Bauman, Adam Schaff) participated in the events, philosophy at Warsaw University was subjected to a thorough reorganization. Chairs were renamed to departments and the Faculty of Philosophical Studies were forcibly joined with the Faculty of Sociology, within which the Institute of Philosophy was established.

In the post-war period the tradition of Lvov-Warsaw School was also continued. To the most important philosophers and logicians of the post-war period connected with the University of Warsaw belong Kazimierz Ajdukiewicz, Zdzisław Augustynek, Bronisław Baczko, Marek Fritzhand, Henryk Jankowski, Andrzej Kasia, Leszek Kołakowski, Władysław Krajewski, Tadeusz Kroński, Jan Legowicz, Stefan Morawski, Elżbieta Pietruska-Madej, Marian Przełęcki, Adam Schaff, Marek Siemek, Adam Sikora, Roman Suszko, Klemens Szaniawski and Bogusław Wolniewicz.

== Current structure ==
- Analytic Philosophy Department
  - prof. Jacek Hołówka (head), dr Bogdan Dziobkowski, dr Justyna Grudzińska
- Epistemology Department
  - prof. Andrzej Bednarczyk (head), prof. Józef Andrzej Stuchliński, prof. Bohdan Chwedeńczuk, dr Renata Wieczorek, dr Joanna Gęgotek
- Esthetics Department
  - prof. Iwona Lorenc (head), prof. Alicja Kuczyńska, prof. Hanna Puszko-Miś, dr Magdalena Borowska, dr Bohdan Misiuna, dr Małgorzata Szyszkowska, dr Anna Wolińska;
- Ethics Department
  - prof. Joanna Górnicka-Kalinowska (head), prof. Zbigniew Szawarski, prof. Magdalena Środa, dr Wojciech Bober, dr Paweł Łuków, dr Zbigniew Zwoliński
- History of Ancient and Medieval Philosophy Department:
  - prof. Dobrochna Dembińska-Siury (head), prof. Małgorzata Frankowska-Terlecka, prof. Mieczysław Boczar, dr Adam Górniak, dr Krystyna Krauze-Błachowicz, dr Marek Osmański;
- History of Contemporary Philosophy Department
  - prof. Andrzej Miś (head), prof. Janusz Kuczyński, prof. Włodzimierz Lorenc, dr Michał Herer, dr Józef Krakowiak, dr Zbigniew Wieczorek
- History of Modern Philosophy Department:
  - prof. Jacek Migasiński (head), dr Lucyna Juśkiewicz, dr Michał Kozłowski, dr Jerzy Łoziński, dr Jerzy Niecikowski, dr Marcin Poręba, dr Tomasz Wiśniewski;
- History of Polish Philosophy Department
  - prof. Stanisław Pieróg (head), dr Andrzej Kołakowski, dr Tomasz Mazur
- Logic Department
  - prof. Mieczysław Omyła, prof. Teresa Hołówka, prof. Marcin Mostowski, prof. Anna Jedynak, prof. Stanisław Krajewski, prof. Krystyna Misiuna, prod. Krzysztof Wójtowicz, dr Cezary Cieśliński, dr Joanna Golińska-Pilarek, dr Jerzy Pluta, dr Tomasz Puczyłowski, dr Anna Wójtowicz, dr Andrzej Zabłudowski, dr Wiesława Żandarowska;
- Logical Semiotics Department
  - prof. Jacek Jadacki (head), prof. Jerzy Pelc, prof. Piotr Brykczyński, dr Anna Brożek, dr Aleksandra Horecka, dr Joanna Odrowąż-Sypniewska, dr Mieszko Tałasiewicz;
- Philosophy of Culture Department
  - prof. Zofia Rosińska (head), prof. Krzysztof Okopień, dr Marek Nowak, dr Paweł Okołowski, dr Wawrzyniec Rymkiewicz, dr Jerzy Wocial
- Philosophy of Politics Department:
  - prof. Barbara Markiewicz (head), dr Agnieszka Nogal
- Philosophy of Science Department
  - prof. Witold Strawiński (head), dr Tomasz Bigaj, dr Mariusz Grygianiec;
- Social Philosophy Department
  - prof. Marek Siemek (head), prof. Aleksander Ochocki, prof. Janusz Dobieszewski, prof. Halina Walentowicz, dr Ewa Borowska, dr Jakub Kloc-Konkołowicz, dr Robert Marszałek, dr Janusz Ostrowski, dr Adam Romaniuk
- French Philosophy Workshop
  - prof. Iwona Lorenc, prof. Jacek Migasiński (heads)
- Studies in German Philosophy Workshop
  - dr Zbigniew Zwoliński (head)

== See also ==
- Lvov-Warsaw School
- Warsaw School of the History of Ideas
