= Marek Siemek =

Polish academic (1942–2011)

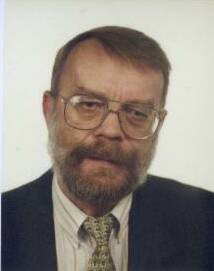
- Born: 27 November 1942; Kraków, Poland
- Died: 30 May 2011 (age 68); Warsaw, Poland
- Occupations: Professor and director of Department of Social Philosophy at University of Warsaw
- Employer: University of Warsaw
- Known for: Philosopher and historian of German Transcendental Philosophy at the University of Warsaw
- Children: Maksymilian Strzelecki

Marek Jan Siemek (November 27, 1942 – May 30, 2011) was a Polish philosopher and historian of German transcendental philosophy (German idealism). He was a professor at the Institute of Philosophy of the University of Warsaw and the director of its Department of Social Philosophy.

Marek Siemek was a disciple of Bronisław Baczko, one of the main representatives of the Warsaw School of the History of Ideas. In his early works Siemek interprets Marxism as a form of transcendental philosophy. In his later works he abandons Marxism for Hegelianism interpreted as transcendental social philosophy.

From 1986 member of International Advisory Committee of The Internationale Hegel-Gesellschaft. Fellow of Collegium Invisibile. On 10 February 2006 he received doctorate honoris causa of the University of Bonn.

Marek Siemek had one son, currently residing in the United States.

== Main publications ==
- Fryderyk Schiller, Warszawa, Wiedza Powszechna, 1970
- Idea transcendentalizmu u Fichtego i Kanta, Warszawa, PWN, 1977
- Filozofia, dialektyka, rzeczywistość, Warszawa, PIW, 1982
- W kręgu filozofów, Warszawa, Czytelnik, 1984
- Filozofia spełnionej nowoczesności - Hegel, Wykłady Kopernikańskie w Humanistyce, vol. 2, Toruń, Wydawnictwo UMK, 1995.
- Hegel i filozofia, Warszawa, Oficyna Naukowa, 1998
- Vernunft und Intersubjektivität. Zur philosophisch-politischen Identität der europäischen Moderne, Baden-Baden, Nomos Verlagsgesellschaft, 2000
- Wolność, rozum, intersubiektywność, Warszawa, Oficyna Naukowa, 2002

=== Translations ===
- "Prawdy szukamy obaj". Z korespondencji między Goethem i Schillerem, with Jerzy Prokopiuk, Czytelnik, Warszawa 1974 (translation of the correspondence between Goethe and Schiller)
- Martin Heidegger, Nauka i namysł; Przezwyciężenie metafizyki, in: Martin Heidegger, Budować, mieszkać, myśleć. Eseje wybrane, Czytelnik, Warszawa 1977
- György Lukács, Młody Hegel. O powiązaniach dialektyki z ekonomią, BKF, PWN, Warszawa 1980
- György Lukács, Historia i świadomość klasowa., BWF, PWN, Warszawa 1988.
- Georg Wilhelm Friedrich Hegel, Życie Jezusa, in: Zygmunt Freud, Mojżesz i monoteizm, Czytelnik, Warszawa 1995.
- Johann Gottlieb Fichte, Teoria Wiedzy. Wybór pism, vol. 1, BKF, PWN, Warszawa 1996
