= Walicki =

Walicki (feminine: Walicka; plural: Waliccy) is a Polish surname. Notable people with the surname include:

- Andrzej Walicki (1930–2020), Polish historian
- Franciszek Walicki (1921–2015), Polish musician
- Michał Walicki (1904–1966), Polish art historian
- Patryk Walicki (born 2003), Polish footballer
