= Scientific socialism =

Social-political-economic theory

Scientific socialism in Marxism is the application of historical materialism to the development of socialism, as not a practical and achievable outcome of historical processes, but what Marxists who ascribe to this there believe is the only possible outcome.

"Scientific" socialism contrasts with utopian socialism by being based upon what Marxists believe was material conditions instead of abstract ideas. Fredrich Engels described scientific socialism as "the final causes of all social changes and political revolutions are to be sought, not in men's brains, not in men's better insights into eternal truth and justice, but in changes in the modes of production and exchange. They are to be sought, not in the philosophy, but in the economics of each particular epoch."

Fredrich Engels, who developed it alongside Karl Marx, described:

To accomplish this act of universal emancipation [proletarian revolution and communism] is the historical mission of the modern proletariat. To thoroughly comprehend the historical conditions and thus the very nature of this act, to impart to the now oppressed proletarian class a full knowledge of the conditions and of the meaning of the momentous act it is called upon to accomplish, this is the task of the theoretical expression of the proletarian movement, scientific Socialism.

The term's modern meaning is based almost totally on Engels's book Socialism: Utopian and Scientific.

Critics have outlined numerous objections to the concept of scientific socialism.

== Origins ==
The term was originally coined in 1840 by Pierre-Joseph Proudhon in his book What is Property? to mean a society ruled by a scientific government, i.e., one whose sovereignty rests upon reason, rather than sheer will:

Thus, in a given society, the authority of man over man is inversely proportional to the stage of intellectual development which that society has reached; and the probable duration of that authority can be calculated from the more or less general desire for a true government,—that is, for a scientific government. And just as the right of force and the right of artifice retreat before the steady advance of justice, and must finally be extinguished in equality, so the sovereignty of the will yields to the sovereignty of the reason, and must at last be lost in scientific socialism.

In the 1844 book The Holy Family, Karl Marx and Friedrich Engels described the writings of the socialist, communist writers Théodore Dézamy and Jules Gay as truly "scientific". But the term "scientific socialism" took on its modern meaning by 1880 with the publishing of Socialism, Utopian and Scientific, where Engels used the term "scientific socialism" to describe Marx's social-political-economic theory of historical materialism.

Although the term socialism has come to mean specifically a combination of political and economic science, it is also applicable to a broader area of science encompassing what is now considered sociology and the humanities. The distinction between Utopian and scientific socialism originated with Marx, who criticized the Utopian characteristics of French socialism and English and Scottish political economy. Engels later argued that Utopian socialists failed to recognize why it was that socialism arose in the historical context that it did, that it arose as a response to new social contradictions of a new mode of production, i.e. capitalism. In recognizing the nature of socialism as the resolution of this contradiction and applying a thorough scientific understanding of capitalism, Engels asserted that socialism had broken free from a primitive state and become a science.

== Methodology ==
Scientific socialism is believed to be a method for understanding and predicting social, economic and material phenomena by examining their historical trends through the use of a version of the scientific method in order to predict outcomes and probable future developments. It is in contrast to what later socialists referred to as utopian socialism—a method based on establishing seemingly rational propositions for organizing society and convincing others of their rationality and/or desirability.

Scientific socialism also contrasts with classical liberal notions of natural law, which are grounded in metaphysical notions of morality rather what socialists describe as the more accurate materialist or physicalist conception of the world.

Scientific socialists view social and political developments as being largely determined by economic conditions, in contrast to the ideas of Utopian socialists and classical liberals, and thus believe that social relations and notions of morality are context-based relative to their specific stage of economic development. They believe that as economic systems, socialism and capitalism are not social constructs that can be established at any time based on the subjective will and desires of the population, but instead are the products of social evolution. An example of this was the advent of agriculture which enabled human communities to produce a surplus—this change in material and economic development led to a change in the social relations and rendered the old form of social organization based on subsistence-living obsolete and a hindrance to further material progress. The changing economic conditions necessitated a change in social organization.

In his collection of texts, In Defence of Marxism, Leon Trotsky defended the dialectical method of scientific socialism during the factional schisms within the American Trotskyist movement during 1939–40. Trotsky viewed dialectics as an essential method of analysis to discern what he said was the class nature of the Soviet Union. Specifically, he described scientific socialism as the "conscious expression of the unconscious historical process; namely, the instinctive and elemental drive of the proletariat to reconstruct society on communist beginnings".

== Objections ==
Mikhail Bakunin predicted rule by a supposedly scientific revolutionary elite would merely create a new type of despotism. All human knowledge is incomplete, Bakunin stated, and even the most intelligent or well-educated person is not necessarily suited for leadership or rule. His objection was to intellectuals claiming advanced scientific knowledge of society who could impose their vision on everyone else, thus replacing existing domination with a new bureaucratic authority.

Leszek Kołakowski in his Main Currents of Marxism (1976) objected to scientific socialism because he said it falsely presented Marxism as an objective science capable of predicting the inevitable course of history and thus guaranteeing the future triumph of communism. He argued historical development is not governed by predictable or deterministic laws, and also said socialist predictions of the future were a secularized form of religious prophecies about eschatology. He also said scientific analysis alone cannot justify particular political systems or moral choices. By claiming exclusive knowledge of history’s direction via scientific methods, communist parties could portray themselves as the inevitable agents of progress, while also suppressing dissent, and justifing repression as necessary for what they predicted was guaranteed future benefit. Moreover, the abolition of private property did not guarantee freedom or equality, since state ownership could concentrate power in an authoritarian bureaucracy. Ultimately, Kołakowski maintained Marxism’s emancipatory aspirations became dangerous when transformed into a closed ideological system which claimed absolute certainty based on their own definitions, resisted external criticism, and subordinated individual liberty and moral responsibility to an allegedly inevitable historical process.

In The Poverty of Historicism (1944) and The Open Society and Its Enemies, (1945) Karl Popper argued history does not develop by predictable or inexorable laws, and there can be no scientific theory which predicts the entire future course of human history. Historical development depends partly on future knowledge and inventions, which cannot themselves be predicted in advance. He also argued Marxists also sometimes protected their flawed theories from refutation by reinterpreting inconvenient evidence.

== See also ==
- Anti-Dühring
- Critique of Dialectical Reason – 1960 book by Jean-Paul Sartre
- El Defensor del Obrero – Uruguayan newspaper
- Evolutionary economics – Subject inspired by evolutionary biology
- GOELRO, an early Soviet national plan for economic recovery which emphasised the importance of electrification
- Historical materialism – Marxist theory of history and society
- Project Cybersyn, a decentralized form of cybernetic planning in Chile that was operational from 1971 until 1973.
- OGAS, a proposed national computer network for economic planning in the Soviet Union.
- Social science, one of the branches of science, devoted to the study of societies and the relationships among individuals within those societies.
- Socialism with Chinese characteristics, the official ideology of the Chinese Communist Party
- Scientific Outlook on Development, a socio-economic concept of the Chinese Communist Party
- Scientific communism, the Soviet Union curriculum requirements for understanding Soviet orthodoxy on the subject.
- Science and technology in the Soviet Union
- Siad Barre, who called his mixture of Marxism-Leninism and Islam "scientific socialism".
- Socialism: Utopian and Scientific
- Socialist mode of production
- The Open Society and Its Enemies – 1945 book by Karl Popper
- "Why Socialism?" - an article written by Albert Einstein which presented a critique of modern capitalism and advocated for a planned economy.
