= Struve =

Struve is a surname. Notable people with the surname include:

== Astronomers ==
- Struve family
- Jacob Struve (1755–1841)
- Friedrich Georg Wilhelm von Struve (1793–1864), son of Jacob
- Otto Wilhelm von Struve (1819–1905), son of Friedrich
- Gustav Wilhelm Ludwig Struve (Ludwig Struve, 1858–1920), son of Otto
- Karl Hermann Struve (Hermann Struve, 1854–1920), son of Otto
- Otto Struve (1897–1963), son of Ludwig
- Georg Hermann Struve (Georg Struve, 1886–1933), son of Hermann
- Wilfried Struve (1914–1992), son of Georg

== Other people ==
- Burkhard Gotthelf Struve (1671-1738), German librarian and historian
- Amand Struve (1835–1898), Baltic German military engineer and bridge specialist
- Detlef Struve (1903-1987), German politician
- Gleb Struve (1898–1985), Russian-American poet and literary historian, son of Peter
- Gustav Struve (1805–1870), Southern German politician and revolutionary
- Henryk Struve (1840–1912), Polish philosopher
- Karl de Struve (1835–1907), Russian Envoy Extraordinary and Minister Plenipotentiary to Tokyo, Washington, and the Hague
- Nikita Struve (1931–2016), Russian-French editor specializing in Russian literature, nephew of Gleb and grandson of Peter
- Peter Berngardovich Struve (1870–1944), Russian political economist, philosopher and editor, grandson of Friedrich Georg Wilhelm
- Stefan Struve (born 1988), Dutch mixed martial artist
- Vasily Vasilievich Struve (1889–1965), Soviet Orientalist

== Things named after the Struve astronomers ==
- 2227 Otto Struve, an asteroid named after Otto Struve
- Struve (crater), a crater on the Moon
- Struve functions, named after Karl Hermann Struve
- Struve Geodetic Arc, a World Heritage Site
- Otto Struve Telescope, a telescope of McDonald Observatory
- Struve Double Star Catalog, compiled by F. G. W. Struve
- Struve 1341, a binary star system with an extrasolar planet
- Struve 2398, a binary star system

== See also ==
- Struve–Sahade effect, a phenomenon in astronomical spectroscopy, named after Otto Struve and Jorge Sahade
- 768 Struveana, an asteroid named jointly after Friedrich Georg Wilhelm von Struve, Otto Wilhem von Struve, and Karl Hermann Struve
