= Józef Kremer =

Polish art historian (1806–1875)

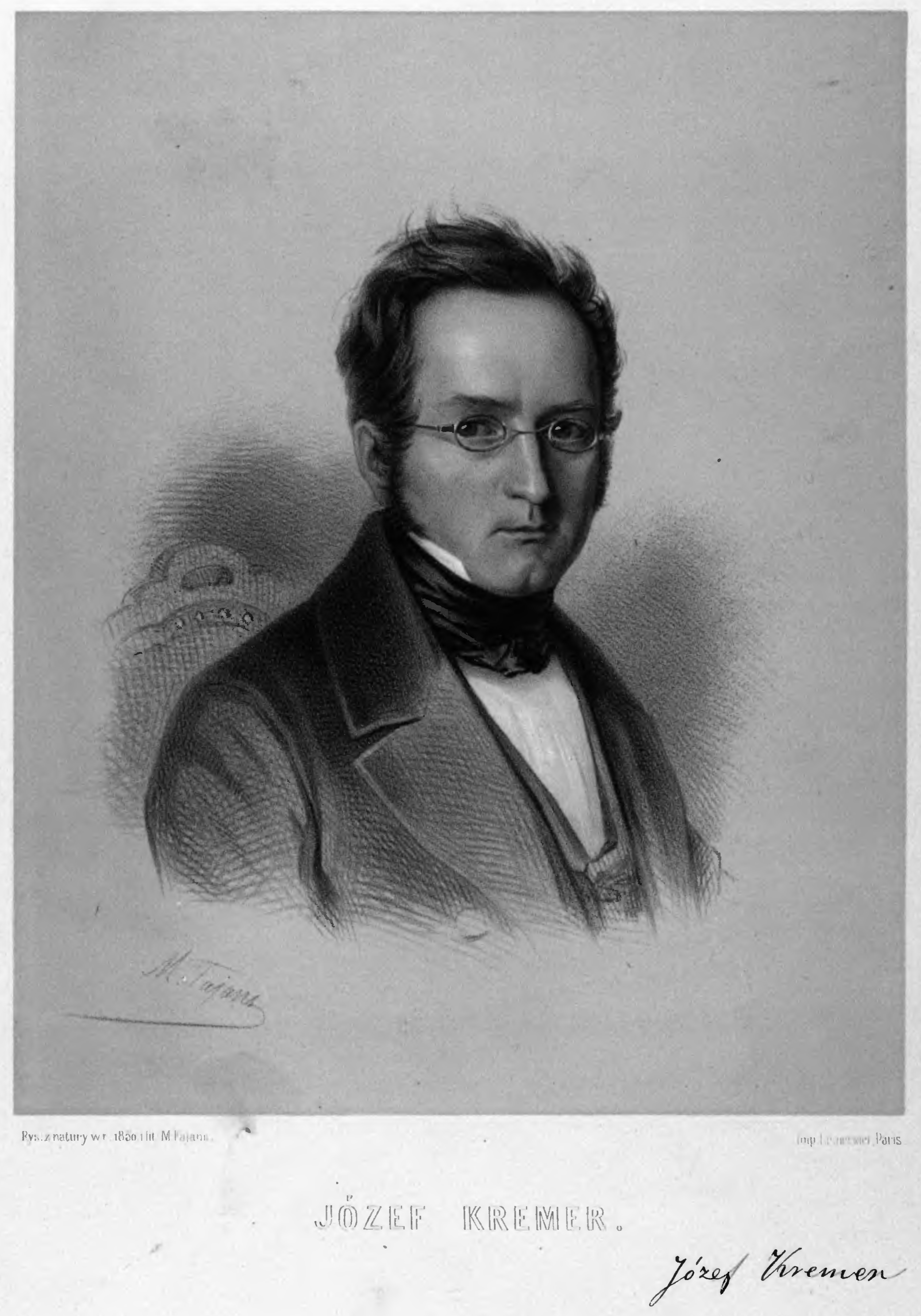
Józef Kremer

Józef Kremer (February 22, 1806, Kraków – June 2, 1875, Kraków) was a Polish historian of art, philosopher, aesthetician and psychologist.

== Life ==
He studied at Kraków, Berlin, Heidelberg and Paris.

He was a professor of philosophy and rector of the Jagiellonian University in Kraków: 1847, assistant professor; 1850, full professor; 1865, Dean of the Faculty of Philosophy; in academic year 1870–71, rector.

He was a member of the Polish Academy of Learning from the day of its founding (1872). Professor of art history and aesthetics of Academy of Fine Arts in Kraków.

Kremer was the first proponent of Hegelianism in Poland. In 1843 he published the first volume of Listy z Krakowa (Letters from Kraków), a dissertation in aesthetics in the Hegelian spirit (vols. 1-3, Vilnius 1855-1856), which brought him recognition and renown. Also his Wykład systematyczny filozofii [A systematic course of philosophy] (vol. 1, Kraków 1849; vol. 2, Vilnius 1852), apart from the work of Karol Libelt, the first systematic textbook of philosophy in 19th-century Poland, was well received.

Kremer's popularity and fame was, however, ensured primarily by his Podróż do Włoch (Journey to Italy; vols. 1-5, Vilnius 1859-64), which soon found place among the classics of Polish literature, and its excerpts were included in textbooks and anthologies of the day. Thanks to the efforts of Henryk Struve, in 1877-80 a twelve-volume edition of Kremer's collected works was published in Warsaw. No other Polish philosopher contemporary of Kremer's could boast such a publication.

Kremer's most important achievement in psychology was the systematic division of psychic phenomena into the conscious and the unconscious, and the treatment of anthropology as a science which probes the mutual relations between these two. By considering the act as the best source of information about a person, Kremer anticipated Wilhelm Dilthey's position.

== Bibliography ==
- Józef Kremer (1806-1875), ed. Jacek Maj, Kraków, Universitas, 2007 (in Polish, with English and Italian summaries), ISBN 978-83-242-0748-0 (online).
- Józef Kremer, "Krynica wiadomości". Korespondencja Józefa Kremera z lat 1834-1875, ed. Zbigniew Sudolski, Kraków, Universitas, 2007 (in Polish), ISBN 978-83-242-0920-0.
- Józef Kremer, Wybór pism estetycznych, ed. Ryszard Kasperowicz, Kraków, Universitas, 2011 (in Polish), ISBN 978-83-242-1638-3.
- In the circle of Józef Kremer. The contribution of the Kremer family to Krakow's culture and learning, ed. Urszula Bęczkowska, Jacek Maj, Kraków, Jagiellonian Library, 2016 (in Polish), ISBN 978-83-943816-3-9 (online).

== See also ==
- History of philosophy in Poland
- List of Poles
