= Jerzy Szacki =

Polish sociologist (1929–2016)

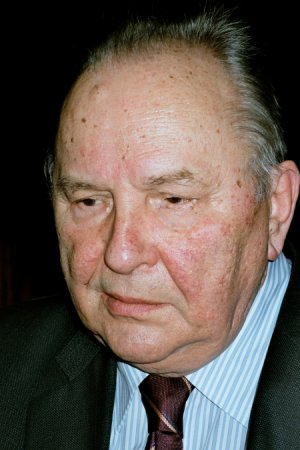
- Szacki in 2004
- Born: Jerzy Ryszard Szacki; 6 February 1929; Warsaw, Second Polish Republic
- Died: 25 October 2016 (aged 87); Warsaw, Poland
- Education: University of Warsaw
- Scientific career
- Workplaces: Collège de France, University of Minnesota, Oxford University, Institut für die Wissenschaften vom Menschen

Jerzy Ryszard Szacki (6 February 1929 – 25 October 2016) was a Polish sociologist and historian of ideas. From 1973 he was a professor at the University of Warsaw, and in 1991 became a member of the Polish Academy of Sciences. He is considered one of the most prominent representatives of the Warsaw School of the History of Ideas.

== Life ==
Szacki was born in Warsaw in 1929. After World War II, he worked for the Polish Telephone Authority, first as a locksmith, then at a desk job. In 1948, he began to study sociology at the University of Warsaw. Incidentally, his was the last class to graduate before sociology was declared a "bourgeois" discipline and the sociological departments of Polish universities were closed in 1952. Szacki himself was sent to work in the Wrocław-based train wagon factory Pafawag.

In 1956, when the sociological department in Warsaw re-opened, Szacki returned there to obtain a Ph.D. degree. He wrote his thesis at the "Institute for the Education of Research Staff" (Instytut Kształcenia Kadr Naukowych), which was attached to the Central Committee of the Polish United Workers' Party and was soon afterwards renamed to "Institute for Social Sciences" (Instytut Nauk Społecznych), whose director at the time was Bronisław Baczko.

Szacki completed his habilitation at the department of philosophy in 1965. He was appointed "extraordinary professor" in 1973 and "ordinary professor" in 1987, the highest rank in Polish academe. In the meantime, Szacki held various administrative positions at the University of Warsaw, including Vice-Dean of the Department of Social Sciences (1967–1968), Dean of the Department of Philosophy and Sociology (1981–1983), and director of the Institute for the History of Social Thought within the Institute of Sociology (1968–1999). Szacki retired from the university in 1999, but has been teaching at the private university-level Warsaw School of Social Sciences and Humanities since 2003.

Szacki lectured and researched at several universities and institutions worldwide, including the New School for Social Research, the Collège de France, the University of Minnesota, the University of Oxford (All Souls College and the Institut für die Wissenschaften vom Menschen (Vienna).

From 1972 to 1976, Szacki was the president of the Polish Sociological Association, and held numerous further administrative positions, including in the Polish Academy of Sciences (PAN). From 1974 to 1991, he was editor-in-chief of the Polish Sociology Bulletin.

Szacki wrote his monumental Historia myśli socjologicznej ("History of Sociological Thought") in Minneapolis and Oxford. It was originally published in English in 1979; while it failed to make a strong impact on international sociology, it became a popular textbook among Polish teachers and students of sociology, a trend that continued after his death. The updated edition of 2002 was awarded with the Prize of the Foundation for Polish Science (Nagroda Fundacji na rzecz Nauki Polskiej), colloquially dubbed the "Polish Nobel Prize", in 2003.

In the 1970s, Szacki began to maintain contacts with oppositional circles, although he never became an active figure in politics. In 1978, he participated in the informal discussion group Doświadczenie i Przyszłość, which brought together pro- and anti-government intellectuals.

In 1991, Szacki co-founded the Solidarność Pracy (Labour Solidarity), a short-lived social-democratic party formed by left-wing Solidarity members, which merged with the Labour Union (Unia Pracy) the following year. In 1998, he prefaced a book about the Gdańsk-based milieu of Polish liberals edited by the politician Donald Tusk (then a member of the Freedom Union).

In 1994, Szacki published a book on Liberalism after communism (original title Liberalizm po komunizmie), which was translated into English and other languages and received favourable reviews in the West. In it, Szacki addresses the challenges faced by liberal democracy in an environment shaped by decades of communism and earlier non-democratic governments - a topic that has occupied much of Szacki's academic publications and popular essays in the general press.

Szacki also translated several classic works from English and French into Polish: Some English-language writings by Florian Znaniecki, a pioneering Polish sociologist, as well as Émile Durkheim's classic work Les Règles de la méthode sociologique, Jean-Pierre Vernant's Les origines de la pensée grecque and Marcel Mauss's Sociologie et anthropologie.

In 2004, Szacki was honoured as a Righteous Among the Nations. As a teenager during World War II, Szacki had helped his mother Barbara Szacka (who was also honoured) hide and support a pregnant Jewish woman named Irena Hollender, who had escaped from the Warsaw Ghetto. In Nazi-occupied Poland, hiding Jews was an offence punishable by death.

Szacki was married to fellow sociologist Barbara Szacka. He died on 25 October 2016.

== Works ==
- 1958: Historia jedynego romansu. Opowieść o Mochnackim [The history of a romance: A tale about Mochnacki]. Warszawa: Wiedza Powszechna.
- 1962: Ojczyzna, naród, rewolucja: Problematyka narodowa w polskiej myśli szlacheckorewolucyjnej [Fatherland, nation, revolution: The national issue in the Polish Nobles' revolutionary]. Warszawa: Państwowy Instytut Wydawniczy.
- 1964: Durkheim. Warszawa: Wiedza Powszechna.
- 1965: Kontrrewolucyjne paradoksy: wizje świata francuskich antagonistów Wielkiej Rewolucji, 1789-1815 [Counter-revolutionary paradoxes: The world-views of the French antagonists of the Great Revolution, 1789-1815]. Warszawa: Państwowe Wydawnictwo Naukowe.
- 1968: Utopie [Utopias]. Warszawa: Iskry.
- 1971: Tradycja: przegląd problematyki [Tradition: A survey of the topic]. Warszawa: Państwowe Wydawnictwo Naukowe.
- 1977 (ed.): Czy kryzys socjologii? [Sociology in crisis?]. Warszawa: Czytelnik.
- 1977 (ed.): Idea społeczeństwa komunistycznego w pracach klasyków marksizmu [The idea of communist society in the works of Marxism's classics]. Warszawa: Państwowe Wydawnictwo Naukowe.
- 1979: History of Sociological Thought. Westport, Conn.: Greenwood Press. ISBN 0-313-20737-2
- 1980 (2nd edition 2000): Spotkania z Utopią [Encounters with Utopia], Warszawa: Iskry / Wydawnictwo Sic! (2nd edition). ISBN 83-86056-79-7
- 1981: Historia myśli socjologicznej [History of Sociological Thought]. Warszawa: Państwowe Wydawnictwo Naukowe. ISBN 83-01-02014-8 (new edition 2002, ISBN 83-01-13844-0.
- 1984 (ed. with Joanna Kurczewska): Tradycja i nowoczesność [Tradition and modernity]. Warszawa: Czytelnik. ISBN 83-07-00599-X.
- 1985 (ed. with Edmund Mokrzycki, Maria Ofierska): O społeczeństwie i teorii społecznej: księga poświę̨cona pamięci Stanisława Ossowskiego [On society and social theory: A book dedicated to the memory of Stanisław Ossowski]. Warszawa: Państwowe Wydawnictwo Naukowe. ISBN 83-01-05488-3.
- 1986: Znaniecki. Warszawa: Wiedza Powszechna. ISBN 83-214-0507-X
- 1991: Dylematy historiografii idei oraz inne studia i szkice [Dilemmas of the history of ideas and other studies and sketches]. Warszawa: Państwowe Wydawnictwo Naukowe. ISBN 83-01-10482-1
- 1994: Liberalizm po komunizmie. Kraków: Znak. ISBN 83-7006-364-0
  (English translation: Liberalism after communism. Budapest, New York: Central European University Press, 1995. ISBN 1-85866-015-7.
- 1995 (ed.): Sto lat socjologii polskiej: od Supińskiego do Szczepańskiego [One hundred years of Polish sociology: From Supiński to Szczepański]. Warszawa: Państwowe Wydawnictwo Naukowe. ISBN 83-01-11787-7.
- 1997 (ed.): Ani książe, ani kupiec: obywatel. Idea społeczeństwa obywatelskiego w myśli współczesnej [Neither prince nor merchant: The citizen. The idea of civil society in contemporary thought]. Kraków: Znak. ISBN 83-7006-786-7

== See also ==
- Warsaw School
- Zygmunt Bauman
- Florian Znaniecki
- Piotr Sztompka
