= Jolanta Brach-Czaina =

Polish philosopher and writer

Professor Jolanta Brach-Czaina
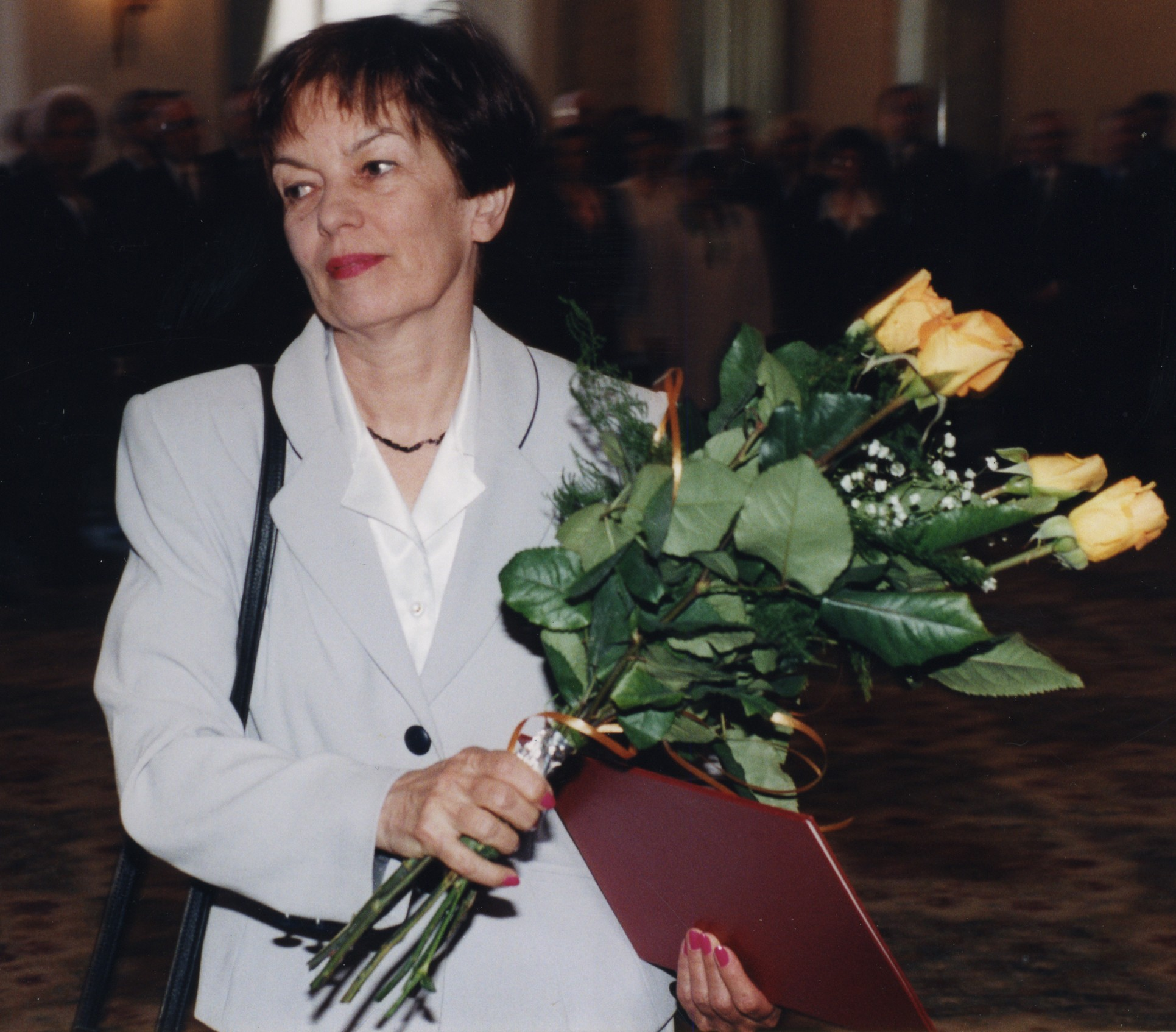
- Born: 26 June 1937; Warsaw, Poland
- Died: 16 March 2021 (aged 83); Warsaw, Poland
- Burial place: Stare Powązki Cemetery, Warsaw, Poland
- Citizenship: Polish
- Education: Warsaw University, Faculty of Philosophy (MA, 1964) Polish Academy of Sciences, Polish Art Institute (PhD, 1974) University of Warsaw, Faculty of Philosophy and Sociology (Habilitation, 1983)
- Occupations: Academic lecturer, researcher, writer
- Employer: University of Warsaw - Białystok Branch (1976 - 1997) University of Białystok (1997 - 2002) Polish Academy of Sciences SWPS University (2002 - 2015)
- Known for: Philosophical and literary works
- Notable work: "Szczeliny istnienia" ("Fissures in Existence") "Błony umysłu" ("Membranes of the Mind")

Jolanta Brach-Czaina (/jɒlʌntʌ brʌh ʧʌ'iːnʌ/; 26 June 1937 – 16 March 2021) was a Polish philosopher and feminist, professor of philosophy, a long-standing academic lecturer, author and co-author of books on aesthetics, the philosophy of art and culture, anthropology and gender studies.

== Life ==
Jolanta Brach-Czaina was born in Warsaw, Poland, and raised by her maternal grandmother, Bronisława Żurawska. In the autumn of 1939 the family travelled to Lviv, where Jolanta's grandfather ran a local mustard factory, in an attempt to flee the Nazi invasion following the Siege of Warsaw (1939). Her mother, Irena Żurawska, arrested in 1940, was shot alongside her own father and Jolanta's grandfather, Józef Żurawski, in June 1941 at the NKVD Prison No. 1 on Łącki Street, during the NKVD prisoner massacres in Lviv perpetrated by the Soviet regime on Polish civilians.

Jolanta Brach-Czaina graduated from the Klementyna Hoffmanowa Secondary School in Warsaw, in 1955. From 1955 to 1957 she studied physics before following a degree in philosophy at the University of Warsaw, and moving on to study theatre directing at L'Universiteé internationle du théâtre, Paris.

She authored, among other works, Szczeliny istnienia(Fissures in Existence, 1992) and Błony umysłu (Membranes of the Mind, 2003). The former work, where she began developing her own philosophical language, was awarded the 'Most Beautiful Book of the Year 1994 Prize' by the Polish Association of Book Publishers, and has been named the "biblia feminizmu" ("The Biblie of Feminism") by literary and art critics in Poland. By signing Błony umysłu (Membranes of the Mind) with the name 'Jolanta, córka Ireny, wnuczka Bronisławy, prawnuczka Ludwiki' ('Jolanta, the daughter of Irena, the granddaughter of Bronisława, the great-granddaughter of Ludwika') the author emphasised the possibility of referring to the matrilineal heritage, and thus rediscovering women's tradition.

Brach-Czaina became the initiator of Manifesta (The Manifesta), a proclamation published on 8 March 2003, rallying for women not to be marginalised in the public sphere and to participate actively in deciding the fate of Poland on the eve of the country's accession to the European Union in 2004.

In 2018 she was nominated for the Julian Tuwim Literary Award.

She was elected the 'Matronka' ('The Matron') of the sixth edition of the PERSONA Cultural Festival (held 21-24 May, 2026), organised annually by the Mazovia Institute of Culture in Warsaw as a multidisciplinary event, whose mission is to honour women's creative work and their significance for the Polish culture.

Jolanta Brach-Czaina was buried at the Powązki Cemetery in Warsaw on 3 June 2022.

== Academic career ==
While following her Master's Degree programme at the Faculty of Philosophy, University of Warsaw, she focused on aesthetics. Her MA thesis, O stosunku widowiska teatralnego do dramatu (On the relationship between a theatre performance and drama), 1964, became the source for an article entitled O znakach literackich i znakach teatralnych (On literary and theatrical signs), 1965, published in „Studia Estetyczne” annual magazine. It became one of the first attempts in Poland at defining the relationship between these two art forms as translation. The article was subsequently anthologised four times across various collections on genology and theatre theory.

She earned her PhD in the field of cultural studies from the Polish Academy of Sciences Institute of Art in 1974. In her doctoral thesis, Od teatru aliterackiego do teatru z widzem (From Non-Literary Theatre to Theatre with an Audience), 1974, Brach-Czaina presented a typological classification and critical analysis of the twentieth-century theatre aesthetics and theory. On the basis of her PhD thesis, she published a monograph Na drogach dwudziestowiecznej myśli teatralnej (On the Paths of the Twentieth-Century Theatrical Thought) in 1975.

Jolanta Brach-Czaina followed a career as an academic lecturer at the University of Warsaw - Białystok Branch, which became an independent academic institution - the University of Białystok - in 1997. She was promoted to the head of the Department of Aesthetic Education, Faculty of Pedagogy and Psychology (est. 1978), and it was during her term of office (1985 - 1997), in 1995, that the department's name was changed to the Department of Cultural Studies.

Brach-Czaina obtained her habilitation in philosophy at the Faculty of Philosophy, University of Warsaw in 1983. In her habilitation thesis entitled Etos nowej sztuki (The Ethos of New Art), she demonstrated that alongside the phenomenon referred to as the crisis of art and aesthetics in the 1960s and 1970s a constructive endeavour to create an ethos emerged. In the book, she formulated the philosophy of an intersection between art and everyday life. Etos nowej sztuki offered an insight into Brach-Czaina's early philosophical thought, where the central figure of a mystical whole understood as a unity of the human and the universe became a fundamental structural element. In her work, she presented a vision of a mystical whole intertwining what is individual with what is collective, and also postulated the need for humanities to transcend Western epistemology.

She taught a seminar entitled „Kobiecość i Męskość w Kulturze Współczesnej” ("Femininity and Masculinity in Contemporary Culture") at the Polish Academy of Sciences Institute of Philosophy and Sociology, School of Social Sciences. The seminar sessions led to the publication of the book Od kobiety do mężczyzny i z powrotem: rozważania o płci w kulturze (From Woman to Man and Back Again - Reflections on Gender in Culture), (publ. 1997).

She became professor of humanities on 14 April 1997.

From 2003 to 2015 she lectured at the SWPS University in Warsaw.

On 11 July 2025 she was posthumously awarded the 'Non Omnis Moriar' medal by the SWPS University.

== Works published in Polish ==
- Z teorii widowiska telewizyjnego (On the Theory of the Television Spectacle) [in:] "Studia Estetyczne" vol. 2, pp. 243-260, Warsaw: Wydawnictwa PWN, 1965.
- Na drogach dwudziestowiecznej myśli teatralnej (On the Paths of the Twentieth-Century Theatrical Thought), Gdańsk: Ossolineum, Wydawnictwo PAN, 1975.
- Etos nowej sztuki (The Ethos of New Art), Warsaw: PWN, 1984, ISBN 978-83-01-04374-2.
- Estetyka pragnień (The Aesthetics of Desires), Lublin: Lubelskie Publishing House, 1988, ISBN 978-83-222-0488-7.
- Twórczy odbiór sztuki (A Creative Reception of Art), ed., Białystok: Dział Wydawnictw Filii UW, 1992.
- Szczeliny istnienia (Fissures in Existence), Warsaw: PIW, 1992; reprinted in Cracow: eFKa: 1993; reprinted in Warsaw: Dowody na Istnienie, 2018, ISBN 9788365970251.
- Primum philosophari, ed., Warsaw: Oficyna Naukowa,1993, ISBN 978-83-85505-05-1.
- Od kobiety do mężczyzny i z powrotem: rozważania o płci w kulturze (From Woman to Man and Back Again - Reflections on Gender in Culture), ed., Białystok: Trans Humana, 1997, ISBN 978-83-86696-23-9.
- Ciało współczesne (The Contemporary Body), essay, [in:] "Res Publica Nowa" no 11 (146), 2000.
- Gęstość, tłok, miasto (Density, Crowd, The City), essay, [in:] "Res Publica Nowa" no 1 (160), 2002, reprinted and anthologised in "Co to jest architektura? (What is Architecture?), Cracow: 2002, ed. A. Budak.
- Manifesta, 8 March 2003, [in:] "Zadra" no 4/1 (2002/2003).
- Radykalna sztuka kobieca na przełomie XX i XXI wieku (Women's Radical Art at the Turn of the Twenty-First Century), essay [in:] "Sztuka i Filozofia" no 25, 2004.
- Błony umysłu (Membranes of the Mind), Warsaw: Sic!, 2003, Warsaw: Dowody, 2022, ISBN 978-83-66778-35-1.
- Rzeczywistość komponowana (Composed Reality), Warsaw: Dowody, 2023, ed. Wojciech Szot, ISBN 978-83-66778-39-9

== Translated works ==
=== English ===
- The Individuation Processs in the Post-Theatrical Activity of Grotowski, [in:] "Polish Art Studies. Past and Present" no 3, p. 143-163, Wrocław: Ossolineum, 1982, transl. T. Wachter, ISSN 0208-7243.
- Neo-Brutalism. Polish Art in the Eighties, [in:] "Polish Art Studies" vol. 11, p. 121-133, Wrocław: Ossolineum, 1990, transl. A. Rodzińska, ISSN 0208-7243.
- The Problems of Polish Feminism, [in:] "Kwartalnik Pedagogiczny" no 1/2, p. 359-374, Warsaw: Wydawnictwa Uniwersytetu Warszawskiego, 1995, transl. A. Graff, ISSN 0023-5938.
- Masks, Shells, Easter Eggs [in:] 'MM Marzanna Morozewicz", Białystok: 2002, transl. E. Kanigowska-Giedroyć.
- Hermeneutics of the Marginal [in:] Being Poland, Toronto: Toronto University Press, 2019, transl. A. Polakowska, ISBN 978-1-4875-2459-3.
- [in:] Knowledge in the Shadow of Catasrophe. Key Thinkers of the Polish in the Post-War Era. Anthology, Paderborn: Brill Schöningh, 2024, ISBN 978-3-506-79395-9.

=== German ===
- Spalten im Sein: ein Philosophisches Fragment (Szczeliny Istnienia), Frankfurt am Mein: Palais Jalta, 1995, transl. Esther Kinsky.

=== Serbian ===
- Metafizika mesa, [in:] "Polje. Casopis za knizewnost i teoriu", Novi Sad, 2006, transl. Biserka Rajčic.
- [in:] Aнтoлoгиa пoљcких есејa, Beograd: Službeni Glasnik, 2008, transl. Biserka Rajčic.

=== Czech ===
- Škviry Existence (Szczeliny Istnienia), Praha: Malvern, 2019, transl. Michael Alexa, ISBN 978-80-7530-208-3.

=== French ===
- Devenir Sœur. Repères dans un sciècle de féminismes polonais. Anthology, Paris: Michalon, 2024, ed. Hélène Martinelli, transl. Mateusz Chmurski, ISBN 978-2-347-00356-2.

== Stage adaptations, film and the performing arts inspired by Brach-Czaina's philosophy ==
- Szczeliny Istnienia (Fissures in Existence), the "Trupa" Theatre Group, PMDK Lubartów, premiere: 2007, directed by Jolanta Tomasiewicz.
- Zofia Kulik, film Jak suma drobnych czynności czyni archiwum (Cultivating the Archive: How the Sum Total of Actions Builds the Archive), 2016.
- Zofia Kulik, film Suma szmat i archiwum za ścianą, czyli królestwo Heleny Kulik, matki Zofii, w którym dorastała archiwistka (A Sum of Rags and an Archive Next Door, the Kingdom of Helena Kulik, Zofia's Mother, in which the Archivist Grew Up, 2017.
- Szczeliny Istnienia (Fissures in Existence), the Zbigniew Raszewski Theatre Institute in Warsaw, butoh dance solo by Sylwia Hanff, music by Pierre Boeswillwald, premiere: 21 September 2018.
- Szczeliny Istnienia: krzątactwo (Fissures in Existence: Bustling About), the William Horzyca Theatre in Toruń, premiere: 31 May 2020, directed by Paweł Paszta.
- Miłość jak śmierć naga (Love Naked Like Death), performance by Katarzyna Swiniarska, the Nizio Gallery, Warsaw, premiere: 07 August 2020, curator: Karolina Kliszewska.
- Szczeliny. Kobiety w sztukach performatywnych (Interstices. Women in the Performing Arts) project, the Jerzy Grotowski Institute, Wrocław: held annually since 12 November 2021, project curator: Monika Wachowicz.
- Szczeliny Istnienia (Fissures in Existence), the Juliusz Słowacki Theatre in Cracow, premiere: 17 November 2023, directed by Iwona Kempa.
- Szczeliny Istnienia (Fissures in Existence), the AST National Academy of Theatre Arts in Kraków - Wrocław Branch, premiere: 9 February 2024, directed by Bartłomiej Kalinowski.
- Pieśni codzienności (Songs of Everydayness) performance, the Critical Arts Foundation, the Zbigniew Raszewski Theatre Institute in Warsaw, premiere: 21 September 2024, staging idea: Marcin Krzyżanowski.
- Nie nazywaj tego wiśnią (Don't Call It a Sour Cherry), the PERSONA Arts Festival in Warsaw, premiere: 21 May 2026, directed by Olga Ciężkowska, music by Magda Dubrowska.

== Inspiration for visual artists ==
Jolanta Brach-Czaina's philosophical works have served as a source of inspiration for visual artists. The following exhibitions and individual works of art have been influenced by her ideas and inspired by her oeuvre:

- Grzegorz Klaman, the „Katabasis” collection, the Arsenał Gallery, Białystok: 1993.
- "Krzątanina 1" exhibition, the BWA Awangarda Gallery, Wrocław: 2001, curator: Anna Płotnicka.
- „Codzienność” ("Everyday Life"), a collective exhibition, the Arsenał Gallery, Białystok: 2003, curator: Zbigniew Świdziński.
- "Krzątanina 2" exhibition, the BWA Awangarda Gallery, Wrocław: 2004, curator: Anna Płotnicka.
- Elżbieta Jabłońska, „Przypadkowa przyjemność” ("Accidental Pleasure") exhibition, the Arsenał Gallery, Białystok: 2007.
- „Krzątaczki” ("Bustlers"), a collective exhibition, the Dom Norymberski (the Nuremberg House), Cracow: 2015.
- „Wiśnie” ("Sour Cherries"), a collective exhibition at the Arsenał Gallery, Białystok: 2020, curator: Ewa Tatar
- Marcin Paprota, „Ciało, Mięso 1” ("Body, Flesh 1"), 2020.
- Marcin Paprota, „Ciało 1, Samiec” ("Body 1, Male"), 2021.
- Julia Bornefeld / Ewa Kulka „Nie potrafię oddzielić siebie od oddechu” ("Ich kann mich von meinem Atem nicht trennen") exhibition, Dom Norymberski (the Nuremberg House), Cracow: 2022, curators: Ewa Pasternak-Kapera, Małgorzata Błaszczyk.
- Janusz Marciniak, "Improvisation, In Memory of Jolanta Brach-Czaina", 2024.
- Janusz Marciniak, "Improvisation, In Memory of Jolanta Brach-Czaina, second version", 2024.
- „Między liniami” ("Between the lines"), a collective exhibition by 'Grupa A2' (the 'A2 Group'), the Arttrakt Gallery, Wrocław: 2024, curator: Karolina Jaklewicz.
- Mateusz Dąbrowski, the „SIĘ” ("Oneself") exhibition, the Piekary Gallery, Poznań: 2025.
- Agnieszka AgaBrwi Stanasiuk, the „Kęs Świata” ("A Bite of the World") exhibition, Warsaw: 2026.

== See also ==
- Wydział Nauk o Edukacji Uniwersytetu w Białymstoku
- History of Philosophy in Poland
- The Julian Tuwim Literary Award
- Artmix Magazine
- Essay
