= In Defence of Marxism =

In Defense of Marxism may refer to:

- In Defence of Marxism (book), a collection of texts from Leon Trotsky, published in 1942, mostly about the nature of the USSR
- In Defence of Marxism (website), a website operated by the Revolutionary Communist International
