= El Defensor del Obrero =

Uruguayan newspaper

El Defensor del Obrero ('The Defender of the Worker') was a newspaper published in Montevideo, Uruguay. The newspaper carried the byline "The first scientific socialist periodical in Montevideo". El Defensor del Obrero was published between August 25, 1895, and February 2, 1896. The editors of the newspaper included José Capalán (president of the Marble Workers Union) and Muvo Luzzoni.
