= The Presence of Myth =

Book by Leszek Kolakowski

- 1989 and 2001 Book cover
- Author: Leszek Kołakowski
- Subject: Culture, Human beings, Myths
- Genre: Philosophy of Religion, Theology, and Ethics
- Set in: Contemporary / Modern society
- Published: 1972, 1989, 2001
- Publisher: University of Chicago Press
- Publication place: France, Germany, United States
- Media type: Print, E-book
- Pages: 138
- ISBN: 9780226450575
- OCLC: 52087035
- Website: Official website

The Presence of Myth is a nonfiction book written by Leszek Kolakowski and translated from Polish into English by Adam Czerniawski. In this book, Kolakowski argues for the relevance and importance of myth as an adjunct to our modern way of life. He cautions against being too skeptical and too rational in modern societies because we would lose connections and values intrinsic to human beings. Kolakowski is also not advocating for myths to have preeminence in our modern day societies.

== Publishing history ==
The book was originally published in France by Instytut Literacki in the author's native language, Polish, in 1972 under the title Obecność mitu. It was then first published in English by the University of Chicago Press in 1989 having been translated by Adam Czerniawski. It was published again in 2001 by the University of Chicago Press. According to the "Preface to the English Edition," the book was originally ready to be published in 1966 in Polish and in Poland. However, the Polish censoring authorities forbade its publication despite extensive efforts by the publishing house. Poland was under communist rule at that time. So, in 1972 it was published in France, and as noted above, by the Polish-émigré publishing house Instytut Literacki. The book was also translated and published in the German language in 1972 by Piper Verlag in Munich, Germany.

== Book organization ==
This book has a "Preface to the English Edition" written by one of the translators, and then a "Preface" written by the author but translated into English. The book is then divided into eleven chapters followed by an "Index of Names". The chapters are as follows:

1. Preliminary Distinctions
2. Myth within the Epistemological Inquiry
3. Myth in the Realm of Values
4. Myth in Logic
5. The Mythical Sense of Love
6. Myth, Existence, Freedom
7. Myth and the Contingency of Nature
8. The Phenomenon of the World’s Indifference
9. Myth in the Culture of Analgesics
10. The Permanence and Fragility of Myth
11. Conclusion
