= Andrzej Walicki =

Polish historian (1930–2020)

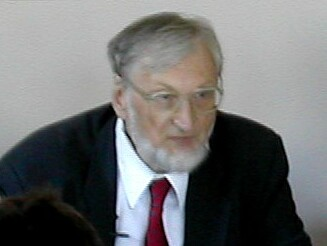
Andrzej Walicki in 2002

Andrzej Stanisław Walicki (15 May 1930 – 20 August 2020) was a Polish historian. He was a professor at the University of Notre Dame in Indiana, United States. He specialized in philosophy of sociopolitics, history of Polish and Russian philosophy, Marxism and liberal thought. He was one of the scholars who formed the "Warsaw School of the History of Ideas".

Walicki was born in Warsaw, Poland. He was the son of the art historian, Michał Walicki. He studied at the universities of University of Łódź and Warsaw. He obtained his PhD in 1957, and became a full professor in 1972.

From 1981 to 1986, he lectured at the University of Canberra, and from 1986 at University of Notre Dame. He was awarded a fellowship by the Woodrow Wilson International Center for Scholars in 1978.

In 1998, he won the Balzan Prize for his contribution to the study of the Russian and Polish cultural and social history, and also the study of European culture in the 19th century.

He died in Warsaw and is buried at the Orthodox Cemetery in the Wola district.

== Books in English ==
- The Slavophile controversy: history of a conservative utopia in nineteenth-century Russian thought (1975)
- A history of Russian thought from the enlightenment to Marxism (1979)
- Philosophy and romantic nationalism: the case of Poland (1982)
- Legal philosophies of Russian liberalism (1987)
- The three traditions in Polish patriotism and their contemporary relevance (1988)
- The Enlightenment and the birth of modern nationhood: Polish political thought from Noble Republicanism to Tadeusz Kosciuszko (1989)
- Stanisław Brzozowski and the Polish beginnings of «Western Marxism» (1989)
- Russia, Poland, and universal regeneration: studies on Russian and Polish thought of the romantic epoch (1991)
- Poland between East and West: the controversies over self-definition and modernization in partitioned Poland (1994)
- Marxism and the leap to the kingdom of freedom: the rise and fall of the Communist utopia (1995)
