= Agnieszka Kołakowska =

Polish philosopher, philologist, translator and essayist

Agnieszka Kołakowska (born 17 May 1960) is a Polish philosopher, philologist, translator and essayist.

She is the recipient of the 2012 Andrzej Kijowski Award for the essay collection Wojny kultur i inne wojny.

She was born in Łódź in 1960 to the family of philosopher Leszek Kołakowski and Tamara Dynenson. She defines herself as a Jew, as her mother is a Polish Jew.

== Books ==
- 2010: Wojny kultur i inne wojny (Wars of Cultures and Other Wars, essay collection), ISBN 9788392611882
- 2016: Plaga słowików (Plague of Nightingales, essay collection), ISBN 978-83-62884-13-1 ISBN 8362884134
