= Jan Białostocki =

Polish art historian (1921–1988)

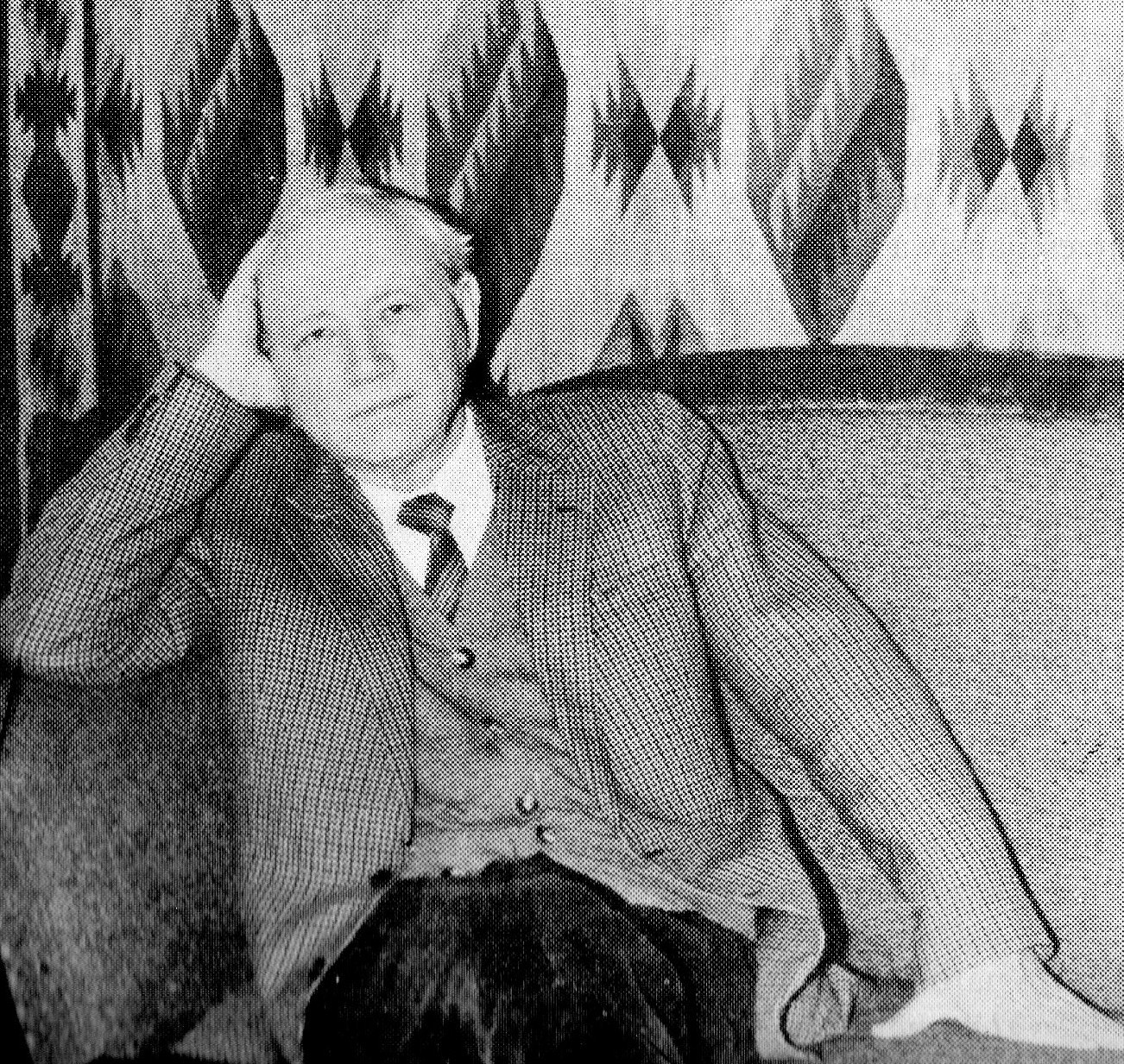
- Białostocki in 1988
- Born: 14 August 1921; Saratov, Russia
- Died: 25 December 1988 (aged 67); Warsaw, Poland
- Awards: Aby Warburg Prize (1980); Herder Prize (1970)

Academic background
- Education: University of Warsaw

Academic work
- Discipline: Historian
- Institutions: National Museum in Warsaw
- Main interests: History of art

Jan Białostocki (Polish: [ˈjan bjawɔˈstɔt͡skʲi]; August 14, 1921 – December 25, 1988) was a Polish historian who was born in Saratov, Russia and died in Warsaw. He is considered to be one of the most renowned Polish art historians of the 20th century.

== Life and work ==
During the German Occupation of Poland (1939–1945), Białostocki studied at the so-called "Secret University of Warsaw" philosophy and art history under Wladyslaw Tatarkiewicz, Tadeusz Kotarbiński and Michał Walicki. From September 1944 to May 1945 he was a prisoner in several German concentration camps. After World War II he worked for about ten years as an assistant at the National Museum, Warsaw and from 1956 on, he directed the museum's art gallery. From 1945 on, he also worked at the University of Warsaw, first as an assistant at the Department of Medieval Art, then as a lecturer. In 1962 he was appointed professor of art history.

Since 1964 Białostocki was a member of the Comité International d'Histoire de l'Art, since 1973 a member of the Institute for Advanced Study of Princeton University. He lectured at numerous academic institutions and museums in many European countries, the USA and Mexico, for instance, at Princeton University (1958), Yale University in New Haven, Connecticut (1965–1966), New York University (1972), the University of Wisconsin (1972), the Pennsylvania State University (1973), the Collège de France (1978) and the University of Cambridge (1984–1985). He also participated in the Twentieth International Congress for the History of Art in New York City. In 1980 he was awarded the first ever Aby Warburg Prize of Hamburg.

Białostocki's research interests were exceptionally broad and included the art of the Renaissance and the Baroque and Rococo, Rembrandt and the Dutch seventeenth century, Romanticism, history painting, the history of art doctrines, and methodological questions of the history of art. According to Józef Grabski, he "tried to instill in his students a need for a broad perspective when looking at a particular work of art. He was, in a way, an intellectual son of Erwin Panofsky. Prof. Białostocki directed the attention of his students to the wide context of every work of art: social, psychological, archival, but also historical, economics, as well as purely artistic. [...] He tried to show us the art historical research not only as pure history of art, but in connection with other humanist disciplines." He has published more than 600 publications in several languages mainly on art from the Renaissance to the 18th century.

Białostocki was elected a foreign member of the Royal Netherlands Academy of Arts and Sciences in 1971.

== Select publications ==
- Poussin i teoria klasycyzmu (1953)
- Pojęcie manieryzmu i problem odrębności sztuki polskiej w końcu XVI i w początku XVII wieku (1953)
- Cyrkiel i „Melancholia”. O teorii sztuki Abrechta Dürera (1954)
- Malarstwo europejskie w zbiorach polskich (1955)
- Badania ikonograficzne nad Rembrandtem (1957)
- Metoda ikonologiczna w badaniach nad sztuką (1957)
- Pięć wieków myśli o sztuce (1959)
- "Dürer, Albrecht". In Encyclopedia of World Art (1961)
- Styl i modus w sztukach plastycznych (1961)
- Teoria i twórczość. O tradycji i inwencji w teorii sztuki i ikonografii (1961)
- Le "Baroque": style, epoque, attitude (1962)
- Sztuka cenniejsza niż złoto. Opowieść o sztuce europejskiej naszej ery (1963)
- "Iconography and Iconology". In Encyclopedia of World Art (1963)
- Encompassing Themes and Archetypal Images (1965)
- Der Manierismus zwischen Triumph und Dämmerung (1965)
- Późny gotyk: rozwój pojęcia i terminu (1965)
- Stil und Ikonographie. Studien zur Kunstwissenschaft (1966)
- Kompozycja emblematyczna epitafiów śląskich XVI wieku (1968)
- Symbolika drzwi w sepulkralnej sztuce baroku (1968)
- Rembrandt's "Eques Polonus" (1969)
- Erwin Panofsky (1892-1968) (1970)
- Two Types of International Mannerism: Italian and Northern (1970)
- William Hogarth (1972)
- Spätmittelalter und beginnende Neuzeit (1972)
- The Art of the Renaissance in Eastern Europe (1976)
- Vom heroischen Grabmal zum Bauernbegräbnis (1977)
- Refleksje i syntezy ze świata sztuki (1978)
- Die Eigenart der Kunst Venedigs (1980)
- Historia sztuki wśród nauk humanistycznych (1980)
- Zeichnungen alter Meister aus polnischen Sammlungen (1981)
- Symbole i obrazy w świecie sztuki (1982)
- Dürer und die Humanisten (1983)
- Dürer and his Critics, 1500-1971 (1986)
- "Die Todessymbolik der Tür". In Festschrift zum 70. Geburtstag von Erik Forssman (1987)
- The Message of Images. Studies in the History of Art (1988)
- Sztuka XV wieku. Od Parlerów do Dürera (2010)
