= Georg Hermann Struve =

German astronomer (1886–1933)

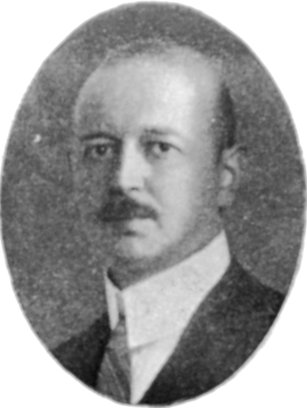
Struve, c. 1915

Georg Otto Hermann Struve (Russian: Георг Германович Струве, romanized: Georg Germanovich Struve; 29 December 1886 – 10 June 1933) was a German astronomer from the Struve family and the son of Hermann Struve.

== Life ==
Georg was born in 1886 in Tsarskoye Selo – a former Russian residence of the imperial family and visiting nobility, located 26 kilometers (16 mi) south from the center of St. Petersburg. In 1895, his family moved to Königsberg. After graduating from a gymnasium there, between 1905 and 1910 Struve studied at the University of Berlin and University of Heidelberg. After defending his PhD thesis in 1910, he worked till 1914 at the observatories at Bohn Observatory and Hamburg-Bergedorf Observatory, and between 1914 and 1919 at the Naval Observatory of Wilhelmshaven. In 1919, he moved to the Berlin-Babelsberg Observatory established by his father Hermann Struve. There, he studied celestial mechanics and continued the work of his father, analyzing movement of satellites of Saturn and Uranus. For observation of Moons of Saturn, in 1925 he visited Lick Observatory where he met his cousin Otto Struve. For the same purpose, in 1926 he went to Union Observatory in South Africa where he was very pleased with the quality of the obtained images. Around 1930, he participated in the Eros campaign, where observations of an asteroid 433 Eros was used to determine the value of solar parallax. Struve also used US observatories. At Yerkes Observatory, he again met his cousin Otto and reanalyzed observations of the complex multiple star system zeta Cancri by their grandfather Otto Wilhelm von Struve.

Georg Struve was married to Marie von Mokk, daughter of a Prussian general. They had two sons, Wilfried (born in Wilhelmshaven, Germany, 1914 – died in Karlsruhe, Germany, 1992) and Reinhardt. Whereas Wilfried became a scientist working in astronomy and acoustics, Reinhardt died during the World War II in 1943. On May 28, 1933, Georg Struve was taken to the hospital with an acute pneumonia and died on June 10.
