= Stanisław Ossowski =

Polish sociologist

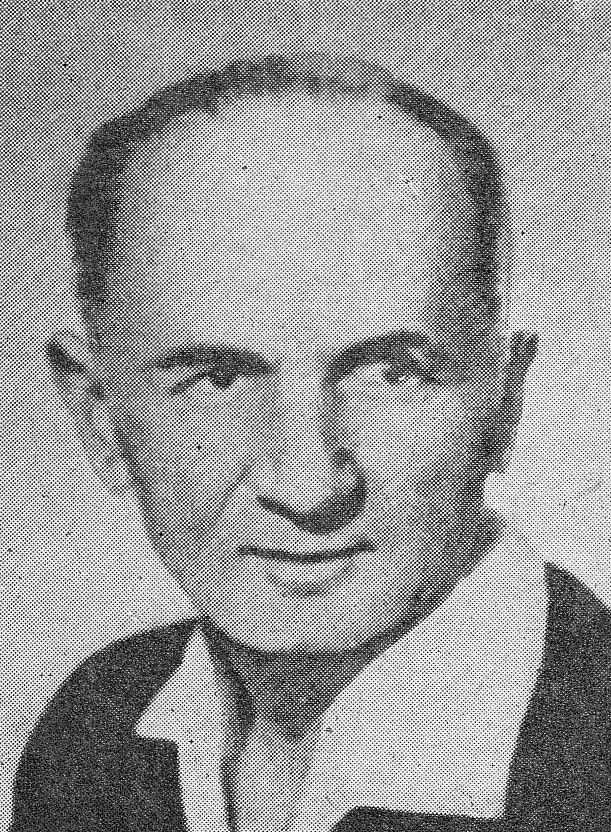
Stanisław Ossowski

Stanisław Ossowski (22 May 1897 – 7 November 1963) was a Polish sociologist. He held professorships at University of Łódź (1945–1947) and University of Warsaw (1947–1963).

== Life ==
Ossowski was born on 22 May 1897 in Lipno, Poland.

Ossowski first contributed to logic and aesthetics before moving on to sociology. He studied philosophy at the University of Warsaw, his teachers were i.a. Tadeusz Kotarbiński, Jan Łukasiewicz and Władysław Tatarkiewicz. He also studied in Paris (Collège de France), in Rome and in London. He took part in the 1920 war. Doctorate (Analysis of the notion of a sign, 1925) wrote to Tadeusz Kotarbiński at the University of Warsaw. He took part in the September campaign. He spent the occupation in Lviv and Warsaw. He taught sociology at an underground university.

He was a proponent of humanistic sociology and antinaturalism, differentiating between the natural sciences and the social sciences. He believed that all phenomena of social life had a consciousness aspect. For example, a social bond, especially ethnic or national, is the result of imaginations and beliefs. Their pathological forms, such as racism or chauvinism, were strongly denounced by Ossowski, while praising positive manifestations such as patriotism ("private homeland" or "ideological homeland").

Ossowski was one of the greatest intellectual and moral authorities in post-war Poland, he has had a strong influence on Polish sociologists, including Zygmunt Bauman and Jerzy Szacki.

In 1949 Ossowski was a founding member, and from 1959 to 1962 vice-president, of the International Sociological Association. In 1956 he was a founding member of the reactivated Polish Sociological Association and became its first president (1957–1963).

Ossowski was married to Maria Ossowska, a fellow sociologist and social philosopher.

Maria Ossowska and Stanisław Ossowski are considered among the founders of the field of "science of science" due to their authorship of a seminal 1935 paper, "The Science of Science."

In 1951 he was removed from teaching. He was returned to the right to conduct classes after Polish October 1956.

An indication of the esteem in which he was held by certain sections of Polish society is a statue of him erected in Central Warsaw.

== Important works ==
- U podstaw estetyki (1933)
- "The Science of Science" ("Nauka o nauce", 1935)
- Więź społeczna i dziedzictwo krwi (1939)
- Struktura klasowa w społecznej świadomości (1957)
- O osobliwościach nauk społecznych (1962)
- O ojczyźnie i narodzie (1984)

== See also ==
- List of Poles
- Robert K. Merton
