= In Defence of Marxism (book) =

1942 posthumous book by Leon Trotsky

- Author: Leon Trotsky
- Original title: In Defence of Marxism
- Translator: Rob Sewell (2010 edition)
- Language: Russian
- Genre: Nonfiction
- Publisher: Marxist Books (United States), Wellred Books (United Kingdom)
- Publication date: 1942
- Publication place: Soviet Union
- Media type: Print

In Defence of Marxism is a posthumous collection of philosophical texts written by Russian revolutionary, Leon Trotsky, between 1939-40. In a series of polemical articles, Trotsky examines issues related to the class nature of the Soviet state, the philosophy of dialectical materialism and party factions in the American Socialist Workers Party.

These polemics were written due to the criticisms raised by a number of heterogeneous factions in the Trotskyist movement which included figures such as James Burnham, Max Shachtman and Martin Abern. These groups posed moral criticisms on the defence of the Soviet Union in regards to the Finnish War and increasingly rejected the theoretical basis of materialist dialectics for a socialist movement.

== Historical context ==
In the early 1930s, Trotsky and the Left Opposition had begun to change their ideological outlook from the potentiality of reforming the Soviet state to seeking a need for political revolution against the Stalinist regime. This faction still adhered to the programmatic principle that the defence of the USSR against imperialist aggression was of prime importance. More broadly, the development of American Trotskyism in this period was confronted with a number of challenges including the preceding defeats of revolutionary movements on the international plane, the Moscow trials and the impending Second World War.

However, their position was increasingly challenged by a minority faction of Trotskyists in light of the Stalin-Hitler Pact in 1939 with James Burnham dismissing the notion that the Soviet Union was still a worker's state. He argued that its military incursions during World War II had subordinated the socialist economy to imperialist interests. Similarly, Max Shachtman had conceived the USSR as a manifestation of "bureaucratic collectivism" with imperialist intentions.

Trotsky was critical of these presupposions due to the wider implications of their arguments in asserting that the potentialities of the "world proletariat are exhausted", socialism is universally discredited and capitalism has been reconstructed as a "bureaucratic collectivism" with a new exploiting class. He believed that the Soviet Union still had residues of progressive elements such as the national ownership of industry and national planning.

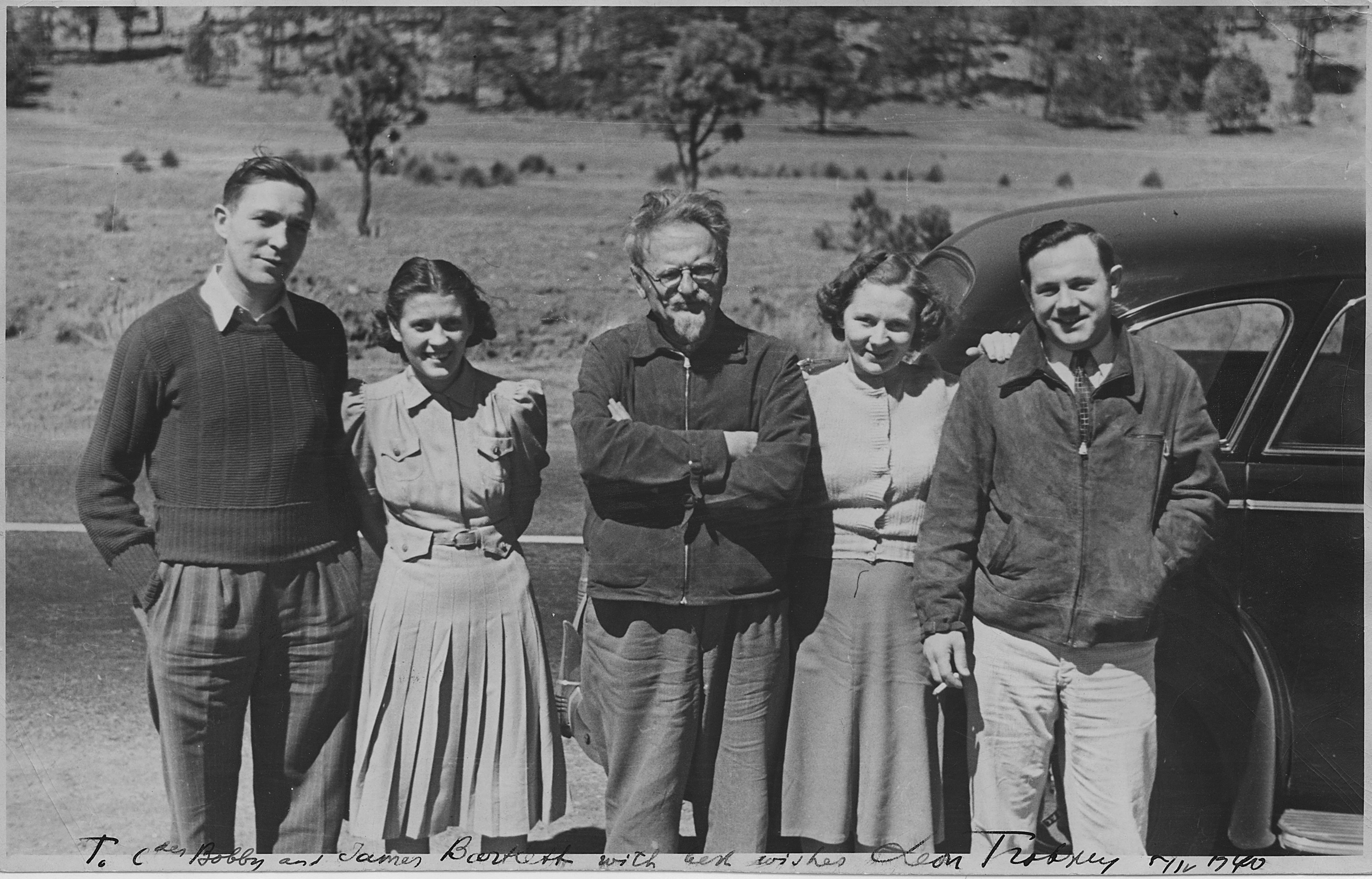
Leon Trotsky and American Trotskyists in Mexico.

Factional disputes within the SWP leadership also erupted concerning the philosophical traditions of Marxist theory and organisational methods. This eventually led to a split in the Trotskyist movement with 40% of the membership departing to form the short-lived Worker's Party. Trotsky aligned himself with the majority faction led by James P.Cannon which adhered to the tradition positions of the party including a defence of the USSR whilst calling for a political revolution to displace the Stalinist regime with soviet rule based on a regenerated worker's democracy.

Trotsky argued that the revisionist tendencies would lead the factional leaders to gradually abandon the foundational theory, political programme, democratic centralism and reconciliation with bourgeois concepts such as pragmatism. Eventually, James Burnham would embrace a political, rightward shift in his later years of his work and became a noted author of The Managerial Revolution.

== Summary ==
The book catalogued Trotsky's correspondence with a number of prominent figures in the American Socialist Worker Party at the time including James Cannon, James Burnham, Max Shachtman, Joseph Hansen, Albert Goldman and Martin Abern. The first section of his writing concentrates on the terminological characterisation of the USSR and its involvement in the Second World War. Trotsky argued that the USSR was a degenerated workers' state and criticised other sociological definitions for lacking a material criteria for analysing the class composition of the USSR.

The second section of his writings discussed the centrality of dialectical materialism for Marxist social theory, political organisation and philosophical outlook. He summarised its fundamental principles as a scientific dialectic in which quantitative changes have qualitative consequences reminiscent of chemical and physical changes in nature. Trotsky would further characterise the dialectical process as reconciliation between opposites such as quantity and quality alongside developments through contradictions which would drive historical change. He would contrast this with formal Aristotelian logic that existence is in a permanent process of transformation. He would also argue that it was a historical trend that figures that rejected the dialectic elements of Marxist philosophy such as Eduard Bernstein, Karl Kautsky and Peter Struve eventually rescinded into revisionism and "petty-bourgeois opportunism".

Other elements of his writings reviewed a range of political developments. Trotsky opposed the Stalinist invasion of Finland as a Bonapartist tendency of the bureaucracy but also urged an independent defence of the USSR for its potentiality as a bulwark against imperialism and social foundation for cultural progress. He also outlined his criticisms of the concept of third camp associated with specific tendencies in the Trotskyist movement. In his letters, Trotsy had also urged the majority faction to exercise tolerance of the minority faction but continue to counter the arguments against Burnham and Shachtman.

His final letters concerned the resignation of Burnham from the Social Workers Party and a restatement of his view that dialectical materialism is a scientific method. According to Trotsky, this method was fundamental for the longevity of a revolutionary workers movement.

== Historical evaluation ==
His writings on the philosophical foundations of Marxist theory have been a source of strong contention and polarisation. Trotskyists uphold the texts as one of his classic works, specifying his theoretical contribution in contrasting the method of dialectical materialism with formal logic and early warnings concerning the minority tendencies in the SWP. Most evidently, his view that these tendencies would gradually substitute the materialist dialectics with other philosophical traditions and inevitably abandon the socialist programme.

East European scholar Paul Blackridge viewed his writings as an important application of the most developed elements of Second International methodology to new sets of conditions. Conversely, political scientist Baruch Knei-Paz found his arguments neither convincing or original, asserting that Trotsky had exemplified a dogmatic strain in Marxist outlook with crude, dubious comparisons between dialectical materialism and scientific methods. Notably, Knei-Paz had attributed Trotsky's motives for writing these philosophical polemics to the period of ideological crisis with tenets of Marxism such as the failure of the revolution in the West and the seeming stability of the capitalist economic system.
