= Main Currents of Marxism =

1976 book by Leszek Kołakowski

Main Currents of Marxism: Its Origins, Growth and Dissolution
- Cover of the first edition of volume two
- Author: Leszek Kołakowski
- Original title: Główne nurty marksizmu. Powstanie, rozwój, rozkład
- Translator: P. S. Falla
- Language: Polish
- Subject: Marxism
- Published: 1976 (Institut Littéraire; in Polish); 1978 (Oxford University Press; in English); 2005 (W. W. Norton & Company)
- Publication place: France
- Media type: Print (hardcover and paperback)
- Pages: 434 (English ed., vol. 1); 542 (English ed., vol. 2); 548 (English ed., vol. 3); 1284 (one volume edition)
- ISBN: 0-19-285107-1 (vol. 1); 0-19-285108-X (vol. 2); 0-19-285109-8 (vol. 3); 978-0393329438 (one volume edition)

Main Currents of Marxism: Its Origins, Growth and Dissolution (Polish: Główne nurty marksizmu. Powstanie, rozwój, rozkład) is a work about Marxism by the political philosopher Leszek Kołakowski. Its three volumes in English are The Founders, The Golden Age, and The Breakdown. It was first published in Polish in Paris in 1976, with the English translation appearing in 1978. In 2005, Main Currents of Marxism was republished in a one volume edition, with a new preface and epilogue by Kołakowski. The work was intended to be a "handbook" on Marxism by Kołakowski, who was once an orthodox Marxist but ultimately rejected Marxism. Despite his critical stand toward Marxism, Kołakowski endorsed the philosopher György Lukács's interpretation of the philosopher Karl Marx.

The book received many positive reviews, praising Kołakowski for his discussion of Marxism in general, as well as historical materialism, Lukács, Polish Marxism, Leon Trotsky, Herbert Marcuse, and the Frankfurt School in particular. Kołakowski was also praised for the quality of his writing. Other reviewers were more critical of his treatment of the Frankfurt School. Reviewers were divided in their evaluations of his treatment of Karl Kautsky, Vladimir Lenin, and Antonio Gramsci. Kołakowski was criticized for omitting discussions of particular authors or topics, his hostility to Marxism, his adherence to Lukács's interpretation of Marx, his failure to explain Marxism's appeal, and for giving a misleading impression of Marxism by focusing on Marxist philosophers at the expense of other Marxist writers.

== Summary ==
Karl Marx. Kołakowski provided an analysis of Marx's work.

Kołakowski discusses the origins, philosophical roots, golden age and breakdown of Marxism, and the various schools of Marxist philosophy. He describes Marxism as "the greatest fantasy of the twentieth century", a dream of a perfect society which became a foundation for "a monstrous edifice of lies, exploitation and oppression." He argues that the Leninist and Stalinist versions of communist ideology are not distortions or degenerate forms of Marxism, but some of its possible interpretations. Despite his rejection of Marxism, his interpretation of Marx is influenced by György Lukács. His first volume discusses the intellectual background of Marxism, examining the contributions of Plotinus, Johannes Scotus Eriugena, Meister Eckhart, Nicholas of Cusa, Jakob Böhme, Angelus Silesius, Jean-Jacques Rousseau, David Hume, Immanuel Kant, Johann Gottlieb Fichte, Ludwig Feuerbach, Georg Wilhelm Friedrich Hegel, and Moses Hess, as well as an analysis of the work of Karl Marx and Friedrich Engels. Though he does not accept that Hegel was an apologist for totalitarianism, he writes of Hegel that, "the practical application of his doctrine means that in any case where the state apparatus and the individual are in conflict, it is the former which must prevail."

The second volume includes a discussion of the Second International and figures such as Paul Lafargue, Eduard Bernstein, Karl Kautsky, Georges Sorel, Georgi Plekhanov, Jean Jaurès, Jan Wacław Machajski, Vladimir Lenin, Rosa Luxemburg, and Rudolf Hilferding; it reviews Hilferding's debate about the theory of value with the economist Eugen Böhm von Bawerk. It also discusses Austromarxism.

The third volume deals with Marxist thinkers such as Leon Trotsky, Antonio Gramsci, Lukács, Joseph Stalin, Karl Korsch, Lucien Goldmann, Herbert Marcuse, Jürgen Habermas, and Ernst Bloch, as well as the Frankfurt School and critical theory. Kołakowski critically discusses works such as Lukács's History and Class Consciousness (1923) and Bloch's The Principle of Hope (1954). He also discusses the philosopher Jean-Paul Sartre. Kołakowski criticizes Sartre's Critique of Dialectical Reason (1960). Kołakowski criticizes dialectical materialism, arguing that it consists partly of truisms with no specific Marxist content, partly of philosophical dogmas, partly of nonsense, and partly of statements that could be any of these things depending on how they are interpreted.

In the preface added to the 2005 edition, Kołakowski attributed the demise of communism in Europe partly to the collapse of Marxism as an ideology. He reaffirmed the value of Marxism as an area of study despite the end of European communism, and suggested that a future revival of Marxism and communism, though far from certain, was still possible. In his added epilogue, Kołakowski concluded that his work on Marxism "may perhaps be useful to the dwindling number of people still interested in the subject."

== Background and publication history ==
According to Kołakowski, Main Currents of Marxism was written in Polish between 1968 and 1976, at a time when it was impossible to publish the work in Communist-ruled Poland. A Polish edition was published in France by the Institut Littéraire between 1976 and 1978, and then copied by underground Polish publishers, while the English edition, translated by P. S. Falla, was published in 1978 by Oxford University Press. Translations in German, Dutch, Italian, Serbo-Croatian, and Spanish subsequently appeared. Another Polish edition was published in the United Kingdom in 1988 by the publishing house Aneks. The work was first published legally in Poland in 2000. Kołakowski writes that only the first two volumes appeared in French translation because "the third volume would provoke such an outrage among French Leftists that the publishers were afraid to risk it." A one-volume English edition, with a new preface and epilogue by Kołakowski, was published in 2005.

== Reception ==
Main Currents of Marxism has been praised by authors such as the philosophers A. J. Ayer, Roger Scruton, and John Gray, the conservative commentator William F. Buckley Jr., and the political scientists Charles R. Kesler and David McLellan. Scruton credited Kołakowski with lucidly describing the main tendencies of Marxism. He expressed agreement with Kołakowski's view of Lukács as "an intellectual Stalinist, one for whom an opponent sacrifices, by his very opposition, the right to exist." Gray called the book "magisterial". Buckley and Kesler called Main Currents of Marxism "excellent" and credited Kołakowski with demonstrating "the connection between Marxist theory and Stalinist reality". McLellan praised Kołakowski for the thoroughness of his philosophical discussion of Marx. Mixed evaluations of the book include those of the Marxist historian G. E. M. de Ste. Croix and the historian of science Roger Smith. De Ste. Croix considered the book overpraised, but nevertheless acknowledged that he was influenced by it. He credited Kołakowski with accurately describing some of the disastrous developments of Marx's thought by many of his followers. Smith wrote that while Main Currents of Marxism is "written by a deeply disabused Polish ex-Marxist intellectual", it is "an invaluable history across an extended range." The philosopher Richard Rorty wrote that eastern and central Europeans who have read Kołakowski suspect that he tells you "pretty much all you will ever need to know about Marx and Marxism–Leninism."

Critical views of the book include those of the political theorist Paul Thomas and the philosophers M. W. Jackson and Jon Stewart. Thomas argued that Kołakowski, motivated by the wish to connect Marx to "his self-appointed disciples", wrongly interprets Marxism as "radical anthropocentrism, a secularization of the (real) religious absolute, a formula for human self-perfectibility, and the self-deification of humankind." Jackson criticized Kołakowski's treatment of Hegel, arguing that Kołakowski is one of many authors who have misleadingly seen Hegel's philosophy as supporting authoritarian politics. Stewart listed Main Currents of Marxism as a work that has promoted "myths" about Hegel.

=== Reviews ===
Main Currents of Marxism received positive reviews from the economist Mark Blaug in Economica, the historian Martin Jay in The American Historical Review, the philosopher Sidney Hook in The American Scholar, and John E. Elliott in the Journal of Economic Issues. The book received two positive reviews in Library Journal, the first from Robert C. O'Brien, who reviewed the original English edition, and the second from Francisca Goldsmith, who reviewed the one-volume 2005 edition of the work. The book received mixed reviews from the sociologist Craig Calhoun in Social Forces, David Joravsky in Theory & Society, and Franklin Hugh Adler in The Antioch Review. The book received negative reviews from the sociologist Barry Hindess in The Sociological Review and the sociologist Ralph Miliband in Political Studies. The book was also reviewed by William P. Collins in The Journal of Politics, the political scientist Michael Harrington in The New Republic, the sociologist Philip Abrams in Sociology, the philosopher Marx W. Wartofsky in Praxis International, and the historian Tony Judt in The New York Review of Books.

Blaug considered the book "brilliant" and important to the social sciences. He credited Kołakowski with summarizing the strengths and weaknesses of Marxism, and praised his discussions of historical materialism, Engels's Dialectics of Nature, Kautsky, Plekhanov, Leninism, Trotsky, Trotskyism, Lukács, Marcuse, and Althusser. However he believed that, due to his background as a philosopher, Kołakowski treated Marxism primarily in philosophical and political terms, thereby distorting the pivotal role of economic theory in Marxism. He criticized Kołakowski for ignoring and neglecting important elements in Marxian economics, such as Paul Sweezy's revival of the work of Ladislaus von Bortkiewicz in The Theory of Capitalist Development (1942). He also thought that there were several other subjects which Kołakowski could have given greater attention, including "the controversies over Soviet economic policy in the 1920s". He considered Kołakowski's bibliography excellent, though he was surprised at the exclusion of the philosopher H. B. Acton's The Illusion of the Epoch (1955) and the philosopher Karl Popper's The Open Society and Its Enemies (1945). He praised the quality of Kołakowski's writing, as well as that of its translation.

Jay described the book as "extraordinarily valuable" and "powerfully written", "an awesome achievement of synthetic scholarship and critical analysis", and a "monument of committed learning". He praised Kołakowski's account of the "origins of dialectic", and his discussion of the philosophical aspects of Marx's theory, though considering them relatively unoriginal. He also praised Kołakowski's discussion of Marxism's economic foundations, and his critique of the labor theory of value. He credited Kołakowski with exposing the fallacies of historical materialism's reliance on the causal power of the economy "in the last resort". However, he criticized Kołakowski's treatment of Lukács, Korsch, Gramsci, the Frankfurt School, Goldmann, and Bloch, calling it "vituperative and ungenerous" and lacking in detachment, though he granted that Kołakowski was aware of this issue. He wrote that while Kołakowski's work contained occasional factual errors or dubious interpretations, there were remarkably few of them considering its length.

Hook wrote that the book opened a "new era in Marxist criticism" and provided "the most comprehensive treatment of Marx, and of thinkers in the Marxist tradition". He praised Kołakowski's discussion of Polish Marxists, Gramsci, Lukács, the Frankfurt School, Bernstein, historical materialism, Hess's influence on Marxism, the recognition of individuality in "Marx's social ideal", the failure of attempts to resolve contradictions between the first and third volumes of Das Kapital, the concept of exploitation in Marx, and Jaurès and Lafargue. He agreed with Kołakowski's that Trotsky's views were no different in essentials from those of Stalin and that Stalinism can be justified on Leninist principles. However, he criticized Kołakowski for his treatment of some Marxists, and for ignoring the sociologist Lewis Samuel Feuer's "research on the influence of American utopian socialist colonies on Marx." He was unconvinced by Kołakowski's discussions of the differences between Marx and Engels and between Marx and Lenin, and criticized him for endorsing Lukács's reading of Marx. He rejected Kołakowski's view that Marx consistently adhered to "Feuerbach's notion of the species nature of man", questioned his view of Marx's development as a thinker, and rejected his view that Marx's historical materialism amounted to a form of technological determinism, as well as his interpretation of Marx's theory of knowledge.

Elliott described the book as "comprehensive" and essential reading for any serious student of Marxism. He was convinced by Kołakowski's argument that Marx's later works, such as Das Kapital, were consistent with his earlier works from 1843 onward, continuing and elaborating their principles. He found the first volume valuable to economists in the "institutionalist tradition" for Kołakowski's observation that Marx never adopted an ethical or normative point of view, his explanation of Marx's notion of praxis, the "interweaving of theory and practice", and his explanation that Marx's critique of capitalism starts "not with poverty but with dehumanization." He found the second volume a "tour de force", and considered it in some ways the best of the three. He commended Kołakowski's discussion of how the various Marxist schools of thought during the Second International differed from each other, and from Marx. While he found Kołakowski's discussions of Lenin and Soviet Marxism informative, he added that they had to be read with an awareness of Kołakowski's opposition to the Soviet regime. He considered Kołakowski better at describing than criticizing Marxism, and criticized him for over-relying on Böhm von Bawerk's critique of Marx's theory of value. However, he concluded that Kołakowski's work had merits that more than made up for these deficiencies.

O'Brien described the book as a "comprehensive, detailed survey of the development of Marxist doctrine" and a "remarkable work". He credited Kołakowski with showing "the essential continuity of development" of Marx's thought up to its culmination in Das Kapital, and considered his chapters on Lukács, Bloch, Marcuse, the Frankfurt School, and Mao Zedong especially valuable. Goldsmith credited Kołakowski with discussing Marxism with "thoroughness and lucidity", as well as with "clarity" and "comprehensiveness".

Calhoun wrote that the book attracted criticism from left-wing writers due partly to Kołakowski's abandonment of Marxism, but that as the only "handbook" of Marxism it was influential even on the left. He criticized Kołakowski's lack of sympathy for Marxism, and argued that he focused on Marxist writers only insofar as they could be considered philosophers and distorted Marxism by giving insufficient attention to Marxist economists, historians, and social scientists. He considered the book clearly written, but not "an adequate reference work." He found Kołakowski's first volume a good discussion of Marx, but suggested that it contained "too few insights not to have been written in a more readable fashion". He found the discussion of Russian Marxism in the second volume both often unfair and over-long. He was unconvinced by Kołakowski's argument that Stalinism was the logical conclusion of the work of Lenin, and considered Kołakowski's treatment of the impact of the Soviet Union on Marxism in other countries inadequate. He agreed with some, but not all, of Kołakowski's criticisms of the Frankfurt School. He concluded that Main Currents of Marxism did not give as good a sense of Marxism as an intellectual enterprise as it could have.

Joravsky saw the book as a continuation of arguments over Marxism that Kołakowski had previously engaged in while a member of the Polish United Workers' Party. He wrote that Kołakowski's negative portrayal of the historical consequences of Marxism was "at odds with the factual richness and complexity" of Main Currents of Marxism. He accused Kołakowski of inconsistency by presenting himself as being beyond disputes between Marxists, while still adhering to Lukács's interpretation of Marx, and of unfairly blaming Marx for totalitarianism. He found much of Main Currents of Marxism dull, and considered Kołakowski's account of Marx's place in the history of philosophy tendentious. He criticized him for ignoring the problems Marx posed to social science and giving Marx credit only for commonplaces such as considering the social context of beliefs, and for dealing only with Marxist writers who were connected with Marxist movements or regimes. He gave a more favorable assessment of his discussions of Austromarxism, Polish Marxism, and Habermas, but was dissatisfied with his treatment of the Communist movement as a whole, accusing him being preoccupied with Russia and neglecting other countries.

Adler described the book as an unprecedented and "largely unsurpassed" critical study of Marxism. Although he concluded that Kołakowski's personal history largely explains his stance took towards Marxism, he found Main Currents of Marxism generally intellectually honest. However, while he considered Kołakowski's critique of Eastern European Marxism to be strong, its strength made his dismissive treatment of Western Marxism and the New Left all the more disappointing. He suggested that Kołakowski's views on the New Left might have been shaped by his contact with the Berkeley counterculture in the 1960s, and that Kołakowski had failed to try to understand what led to the crisis of faith in the values of democratic societies that produced the New Left. He praised Kołakowski's discussion of Gramsci and Lukács, but wrote that he "applies them one-sidedly to a critique of Eastern Marxism, never to how their critiques of hegemony and reification might apply specifically to conditions of advanced capitalism", and that his treatment of the Frankfurt School and Marcuse was harsh and unfair. He also found the one-volume edition of the book so large and heavy as to be cumbersome and physically difficult to use.

Hindess described the book as "a ponderous polemic" against Marxism, Lenin, and the Bolsheviks. He considered Kołakowski lacking in detachment, and criticized him for not considering alternatives to his view that Marx's thought was a philosophical anthropology settled in its essential features by the time of The German Ideology, and for relying on "the notion of totalitarianism", which he considered "worthless as a tool of political analysis". He argued that because Kołakowski viewed Marxism as a philosophy he gave insufficient attention to "the use of Marxism as a means of political calculation or to the substantive questions of political and economic analysis posed in numerous Marxist attempts at concrete analysis". He accused Kołakowski of providing misleading discussions of Marxist writers such as Kautsky, and of Lenin's politics and the development of Stalinism. He described Kołakowski's account of Marxism as a "grotesque and offensive caricature" that failed to explain Marxism's impact on the modern world.

Miliband wrote that Kołakowski had provided a comprehensive survey of Marxism. However, while he praised much of Kołakowski's discussion of Marxism, he considered him too hostile to Marxism for his description of his work as a "handbook" to be accurate, and maintained that his approach to Marxism and its history was "fundamentally misconceived". He argued that Kołakowski's view of the relation of Marxism to Leninism and Stalinism was mistaken, and that Kołakowski ignored important differences between Marx's early and later work, falsely portraying Marx as an "unchanging philosophical visionary" rather than primarily as an "economic and social theorist". He described Kołakowski's view that Marxism aimed at "a society of perfect unity, in which all human aspirations would be fulfilled and all values reconciled" as "absurdly overdrawn", and inconsistent with some of Kołakowski's other observations, maintaining that Kołakowski did not provide sufficient argument to support his conclusions. He accused Kołakowski of misrepresented Marx and failing to explain the appeal of Marxism; he also faulted Kołakowski's discussion of historical materialism, and accused him of "character assassination" against Luxemburg. He rejected Kołakowski's view that reformist socialism and Leninism are the only two political options for Marxists. He concluded that Main Currents of Marxism was unworthy of its author's talent or his subject. Kołakowski replied to Miliband's review, reaffirming his views as expressed in Main Currents of Marxism, and accusing Miliband of misrepresenting them.
