= Bronisław Baczko =

Polish philosopher and historian

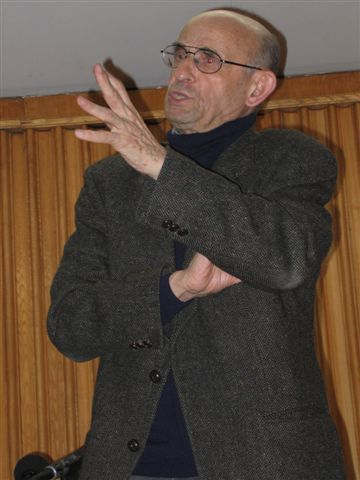
Bronisław Baczko

Bronisław Baczko (13 June 1924 – 29 August 2016) was a Polish philosopher and historian of ideas. Together with Leszek Kołakowski, he was a leading figure in the Warsaw School of the history of ideas in the late 1950s and 1960s.

He was born and died in Warsaw.

== Prizes and honours ==
- 2011: Balzan Prize for his work on the Age of Enlightenment
