= Michał Walicki =

Polish art historian

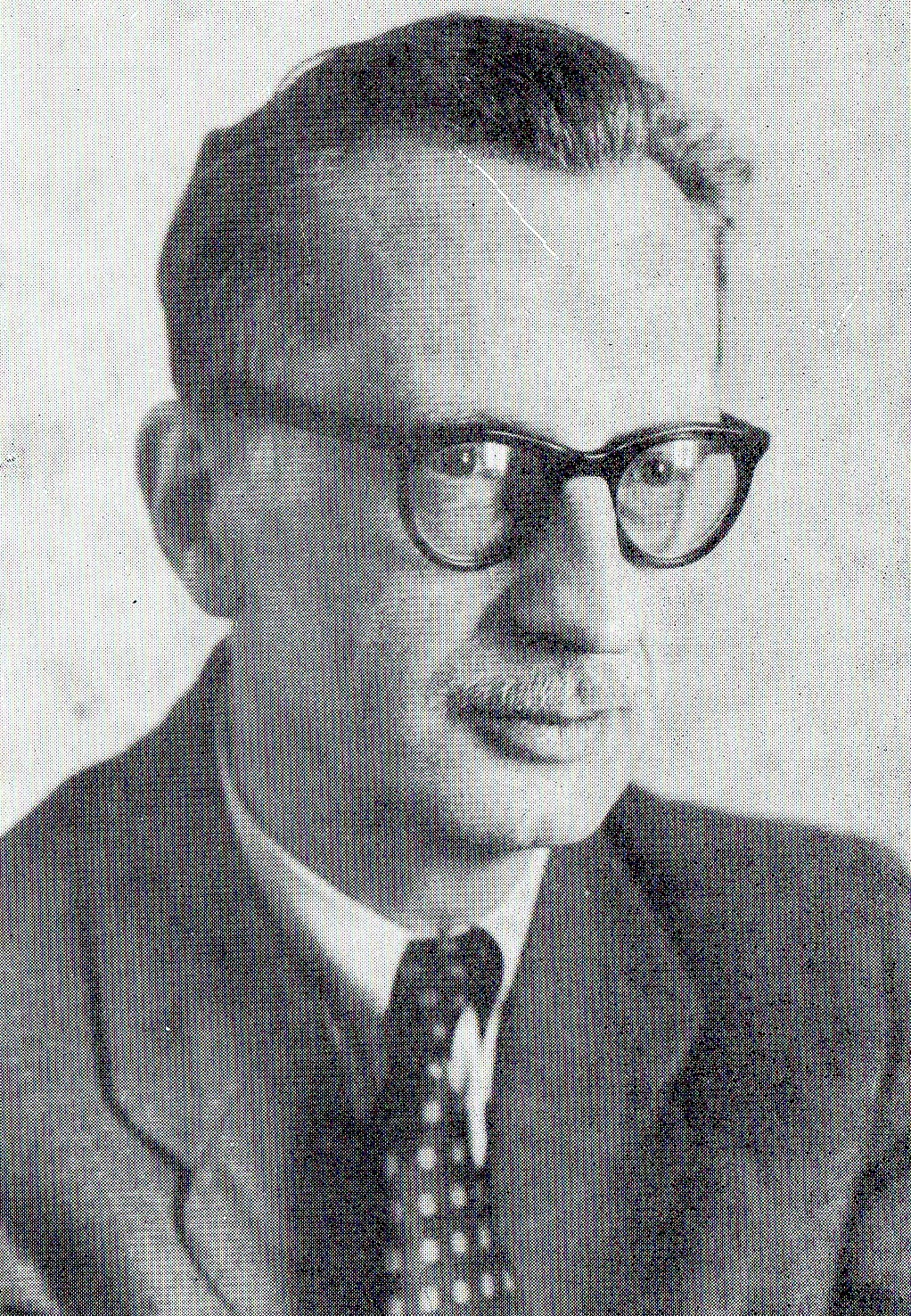
Michał Walicki

Michał Marian Walicki (8 August 1904 in St. Petersburg – 22 August 1966 in Warsaw) was a Polish art historian and professor at the Warsaw University of Technology and School of Fine Arts (later Academy of Fine Arts in Warsaw).

== Life and work ==
From 1924 to 1929, Walicki studied art history at the University of Warsaw, where he also wrote his PhD thesis. In 1934 he was appointed associate professor and in 1937 full professor of art history. He worked at the Department of Polish Architecture at the Warsaw Technical University, at the Warsaw School of Fine Arts (later the Academy of Fine Arts in Warsaw), at the National Museum, Warsaw, where he was curator of the Gallery of Foreign Painting, and at the Art History Institute of the University of Warsaw.

According to Juliusz Chrościcki, Walicki was a great art historian. He was a consummate connoisseur of seventeenth-century Dutch painting and Polish Gothic painting, and wrote, as author or co-author, many publications devoted to Polish and foreign painting. He also promoted the popularization of, and education through, art, as he could write about art in a manner accessible and understandable to all.

Walicki worked at the Department of Polish Architecture of the Warsaw Technical University in 1929–1936 and at the Academy of Fine Arts in Warsaw in 1932–1939 and 1945–1949, he was awarded by the Officer's Cross of the Order of Polonia Restituta in 1947.

Walicki's most famous student was Jan Białostocki. In his younger years, the latter worked as an assistant to Walicki at the National Museum, Warsaw, and, as an unpaid assistant, also at the University of Warsaw in Walicki's Institute of Medieval Art History. In 1957, Walicki and Białostocki wrote an overview of the history of painting collecting in Poland.

In 1949 Walicki was arrested and imprisoned till 1953 on the grounds of both false accusations and a fabricated evidence.

== Select publications ==
- (with Juliusz Starzyński), Dzieje sztuki polskiej (1934)
- Malarstwo polskie XV wieku (1938)
- Malarstwo obce w zbiorach polskich (1955)
- (with Jan Białostocki), Malarstwo polskie, Gotyk, renesans, wczesny manieryzm (1961)
- Obrazy dalekie i bliskie (1963)
- Złoty widnokrąg (1965)
