= Warsaw School (history of ideas) =

The Warsaw School was a group of Polish historians of ideas active in the late 1950s and the 1960s. It was headed by Bronisław Baczko and Leszek Kołakowski and also included scholars such as Andrzej Walicki, Jerzy Szacki and Krzysztof Pomian.

== History ==
Members of the group had institutional ties with the PAN Institute of Philosophy and Sociology and the Department of History of Modern Philosophy of the University of Warsaw headed by Baczko and Kołakowski. Critical of orthodox Marxism and the policies of the Polish United Workers' Party (which they both were members of), Baczko and Kołakowski became inconvenient figures for the Polish authorities. On 21 October 1966, Kołakowski and Krzysztof Pomian gave formal speeches at a debate at the Faculty of History of the University of Warsaw where they openly criticised the ten-year rule of the Gomułka cabinet for incompetence, restrictions placed on freedom of speech, and the absence of democratic institutions in Poland. Pomian and Kołakowski were immediately expelled from the Communist party, followed by Baczko in 1968. The Warsaw School fully disintegrated in the wake of the March 1968 political crisis. Members of the group were involved in supporting students affected by reprisals in the aftermath of the riots, and many emigrated to escape persecution.

== Ideas and methods ==
The methods used by members of the Warsaw School were varied, and some have argued that it was more a social grouping of intellectuals than a school of thought. However, certain shared characteristics can be found in works written by the group's members. The School held a researcher is supposed to place himself outside of the investigated subject valued objectivity, pluralism and the political independence of science. Their methodology borrowed from Marxism, hermeneutics, German sociology of knowledge, existentialism and elements of Claude Lévi-Strauss' structuralism and aimed to describe historical phenomena without making statements about their truth or falsity. They believed ideologies (including, controversially, Marxism) to be the products of the historical conditions of their times, in contrast to the historical materialist idea that mental structure is solely a derivative of social class. They were also interested in individual, religious and group ideologies and emphasised that history was a product of individual humans.
