= Leszek Kołakowski =

Polish philosopher and historian of ideas (1927–2009)

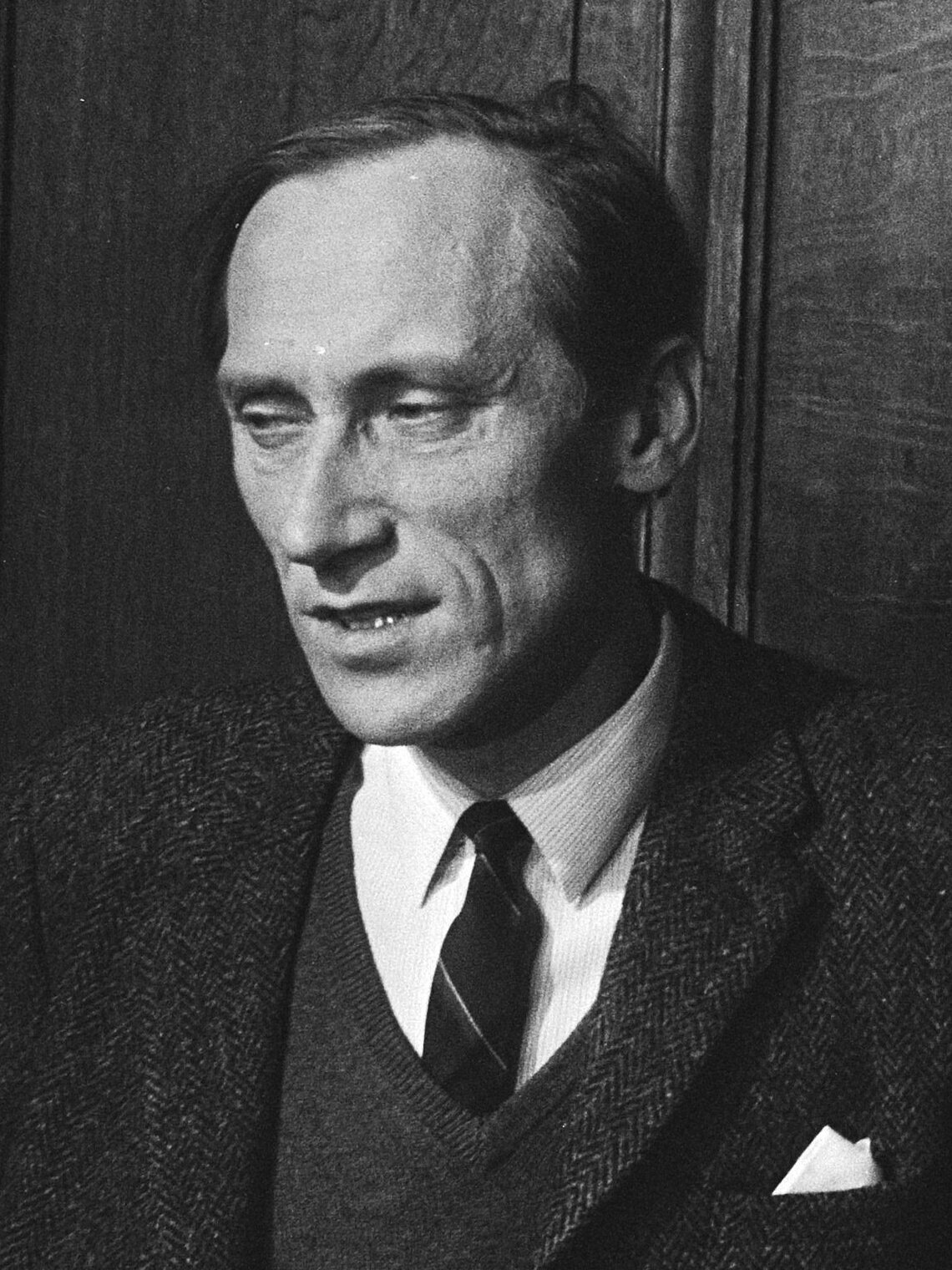
- Kołakowski in 1971
- Born: 23 October 1927; Radom, Poland
- Died: 17 July 2009 (aged 81); Oxford, England
- Awards: Peace Prize of the German Book Trade (1977); MacArthur Fellowship (1983); Erasmus Prize (1983); Kluge Prize (2003); Jerusalem Prize (2007)

Education
- Education: University of Łódź; University of Warsaw (PhD, 1953)
- Thesis: Nauka Spinozy o wyzwoleniu człowieka [Spinoza's Teaching on Human Liberation] (1953)
- Doctoral advisor: Adam Schaff

Philosophical work
- Era: Contemporary philosophy
- Region: Western philosophy: Polish philosophy
- School: Continental philosophy; Marxist humanism; Warsaw School
- Institutions: University of Warsaw
- Doctoral students: Gillian Rose
- Main interests: Intellectual history; Politics; Religion
- Notable works: Main Currents of Marxism (1976)
- Notable ideas: Humanist interpretation of Marx; Criticism of Marxism

Leszek Kołakowski (/ˌkɒləˈkɒfski/; Polish: [ˈlɛʂɛk kɔwaˈkɔfskʲi]; 23 October 1927 – 17 July 2009) was a Polish philosopher and historian of ideas. He is best known for his critical analysis of contemporary Marxist thought and theory, as in his three-volume history of Marxist philosophy Main Currents of Marxism (1976). In his later work, Kołakowski increasingly focused on religious questions. In his 1986 Jefferson Lecture, he asserted that "we learn history not in order to know how to behave or how to succeed, but to know who we are".

Kołakowski was initially a Marxist humanist, but he came to renounce it. Owing to his criticism of Marxism and of the Communist state system, Kołakowski was effectively exiled from Poland in 1968. He spent most of the remainder of his career at the University of Oxford, as a Fellow of All Souls College. Despite being in exile, Kołakowski was a major inspiration to the Solidarity movement which flourished in Poland in the 1980s and is credited by some as having helped bring about the collapse of the Soviet Union. Bronisław Geremek dubbed him as the "awakener of human hopes". Among many awards, he was a laureate of the MacArthur Fellowship and Erasmus Prize in 1983, the 2003 Kluge Prize, and in 2007, the Jerusalem Prize.

== Life and career ==
=== Early life and education ===
Kołakowski was born in Radom, Poland. His secondary schooling during the German occupation of Poland (1939–1945) in World War II, would have been truncated and supplied by alternative means, known as "komplety" in Polish, in the form of occasional private lessons, and supplemented by personal reading. He passed his school-leaving examinations as an external student in the underground school system. After the war, he studied philosophy at the University of Łódź followed by the University of Warsaw, where he completed a doctorate in 1953 under the supervision of Adam Schaff, with a treatise on Spinoza from a Marxist viewpoint. He served as a professor and chair of Warsaw University's department of History of Philosophy from 1959 to 1968.

In his youth, Kołakowski became a communist. He signed a denunciation of Władysław Tatarkiewicz. In 1945, he joined the Association of Fighting Youth. From 1947 to 1966, he was a member of the Polish United Workers' Party. His intellectual promise earned him a trip to Moscow in 1950. He broke with Stalinism, becoming a revisionist Marxist advocating a humanist interpretation of Karl Marx. One year after the 1956 Polish October, Kołakowski published a four-part critique of Soviet Marxist dogmas, including historical determinism, in the Polish periodical Nowa Kultura. His public lecture at Warsaw University on the tenth anniversary of Polish October led to his expulsion from the Polish United Workers' Party. In the course of the 1968 Polish political crisis, he lost his job at Warsaw University and was prevented from obtaining any other academic post.

He came to the conclusion that the totalitarian cruelty of Stalinism was not an aberration but a logical outcome of Marxism, whose genealogy he examined in his monumental Main Currents of Marxism, his major work, published in 1976 to 1978.

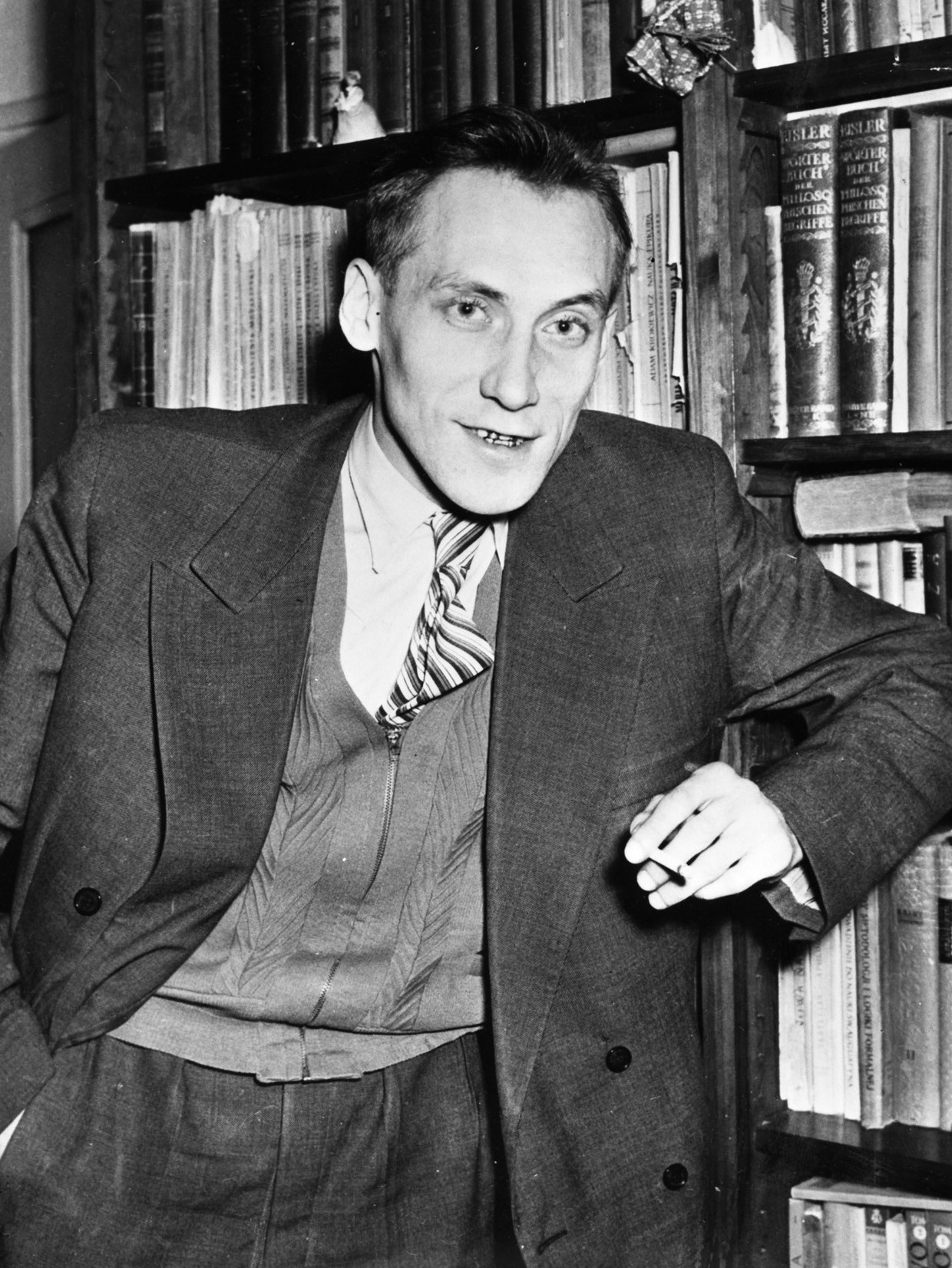
Kołakowski, ANeFo

=== Thought ===
Kołakowski became increasingly concerned with the role which theological assumptions play in Western culture and, in particular, in modern thought. For example, he began his Main Currents of Marxism with an analysis of the contribution that various forms of ancient and medieval Platonism made, centuries later, to a Hegelian view of history. He goes on to criticize the laws of dialectical materialism for being fundamentally flawed and likened some of them to "truisms with no specific Marxist content", while describing others as "philosophical dogmas that cannot be proved by scientific means" or dismissed them as mere "nonsense".

Kołakowski defended the role which freedom of will plays in the human quest for the transcendent. His Law of the Infinite Cornucopia asserted a doctrine of status quaestionis: such that any given doctrine can be relied on to attract supportive arguments. Moreover although human frailty implies that claims of infallibility need to be treated with scepticism, he regarded people's pursuit of higher ideals, such as truth and goodness as ennobling.

=== Activism and exile ===
In 1965, Kołakowski, together with Maria Ossowska and Tadeusz Kotarbiński drew up a report on the meaning of the concept of the message, which was used by the defence in the trial of Jacek Kuroń and Karol Modzelewski who were charged by the communist authorities with "propagating false information", in their Open Letter to the Party.

In 1968, Kołakowski was forced into exile. He became a visiting professor in the Department of Philosophy at McGill University in Montreal and in 1969 he moved to the University of California, Berkeley, where his experience of the student protests prompted him to abandon the New Left. In 1970, he was backed to head the University of Frankfurt Institute for Social Research after Theodor Adorno's death by Adorno's assistant Jürgen Habermas, but the proposal met with opposition from the philosophy department. He became a senior research fellow at All Souls College, Oxford in the same year. Thereafter he remained mostly in Oxford, but spent part of 1974 at Yale University, and from 1981 to 1994, was a part-time professor at the Committee on Social Thought and in the Department of Philosophy at the University of Chicago.

Although the Polish Communist authorities had officially banned his works in Poland, they became part of the Polish Samizdat and influenced the Polish intellectual opposition. His 1971 essay, Theses on Hope and Hopelessness (full title: In Stalin's Countries: Theses on Hope and Despair), which suggested that self-organized social groups could gradually extend civil society in a totalitarian state, helped to inspire the dissident movements of the 1970s. These in turn led to the formation of Solidarity and eventually to the collapse of Communist rule in Eastern Europe in 1989. In 1975, he was one of the signatories of the Letter of 59, an open letter signed by Polish intellectuals to protest against the changes to the Constitution of the People's Republic of Poland which were imposed by the Communist Party of Poland in 1975. In the October 1978 issue of Encounter, he published his political manifesto How to be a Conservative-Liberal Socialist: A Credo, which according to Timothy Garton Ash prefigured the ideological orientation of Solidarity's programme. In the 1980s, Kołakowski supported Solidarity by giving interviews, writing and fundraising.

Kołakowski maintained throughout his life a view of Marxism that was distinct from that operating in the then existing political regimes. He relentlessly disputed these differences and defended his own interpretation of Marxism. In a famous article entitled, "What is Left of Socialism", he wrote:

The Bolshevik Revolution in Russia had nothing to do with Marxian prophesies. Its driving force was not a conflict between the industrial working class and capital, but rather was carried out under slogans that had no socialist, let alone Marxist, content: Peace and land for peasants. There is no need to mention that these slogans were to be subsequently turned into their opposite. What in the twentieth century perhaps comes closest to the working class revolution were the events in Poland of 1980–81: the revolutionary movement of industrial workers (very strongly supported by the intelligentsia) against the exploiters, that is to say, the state. And this solitary example of a working class revolution (if even this may be counted) was directed against a socialist state, and carried out under the sign of the cross, with the blessing of the Pope.

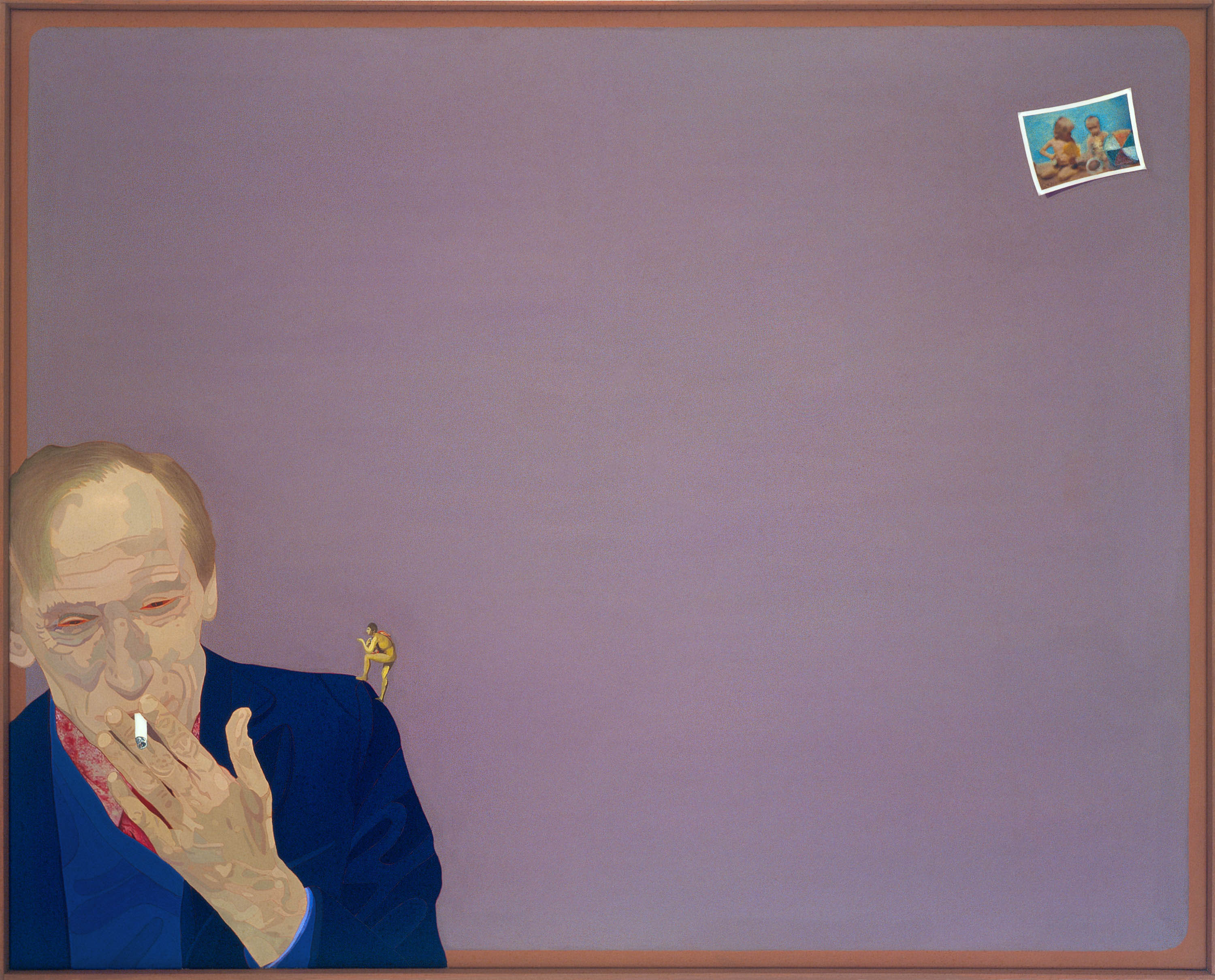
Leszek Kolakowski - a tribute on his 50th birthday by Ewa Kuryluk

=== Reception in Poland ===
In Poland, Kołakowski is regarded as a philosopher and historian of ideas but also as an icon for anti-communism and opponent of communism. Adam Michnik has called Kołakowski "one of the most prominent creators of contemporary Polish culture".

He authored more than 30 books in a career spanning more than five decades. He is also regarded as a great populariser of philosophy. His writings, lectures and TV appearances encouraged people to ask questions, even the most banal ones, and he highlighted the archetypal role of the jester in philosophy – someone who is unafraid "to challenge even our strongest assumptions and maintains a healthy distance from everything."

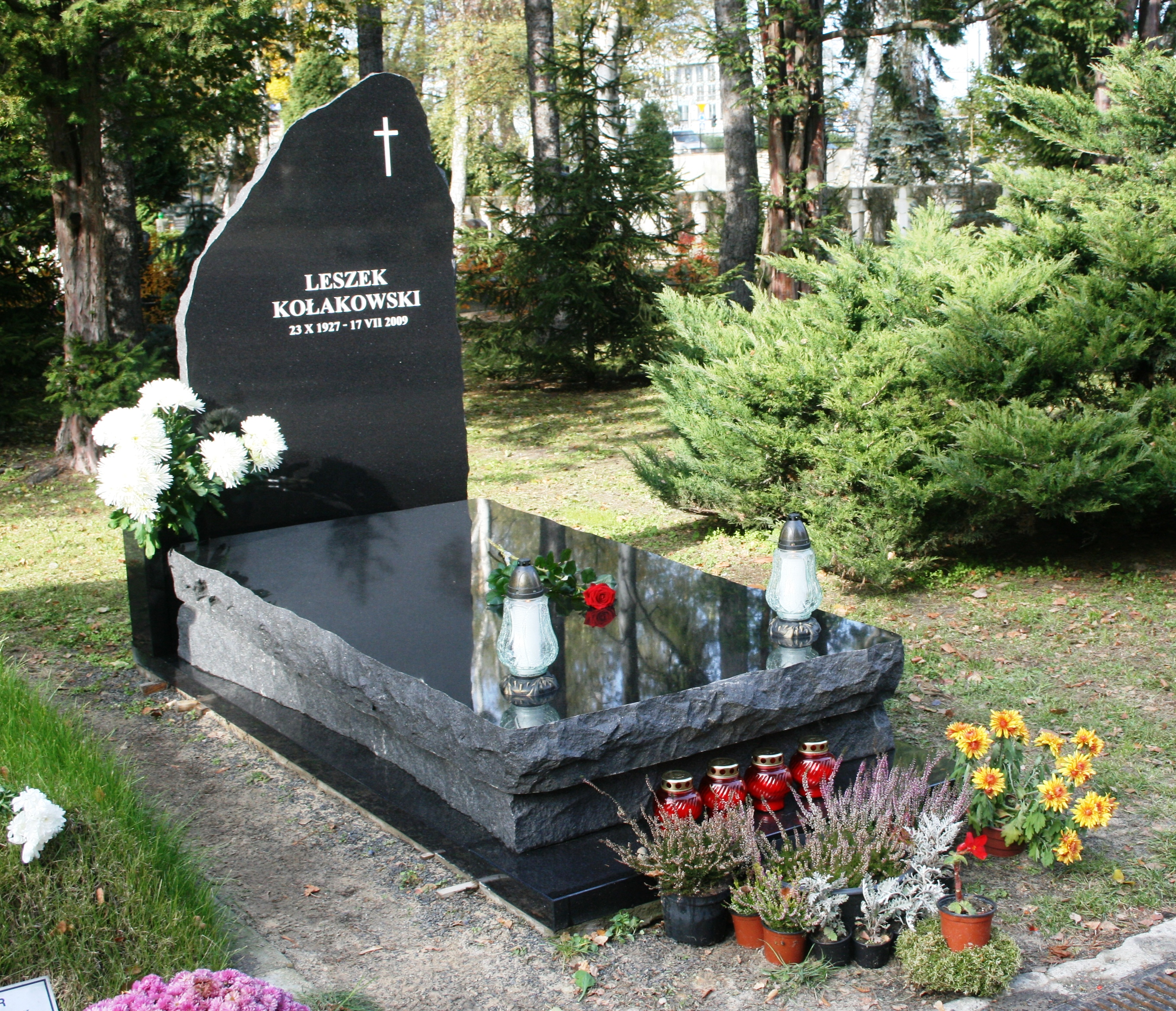
Kolakowski's grave in the Powązki Military Cemetery, Warsaw

== Death ==
Kołakowski died from multiple organ failure on 17 July 2009, aged 81, at the John Radcliffe Hospital in Oxford, England. In an obituary, philosopher Roger Scruton wrote that Kołakowski was a "thinker for our time" and that, regarding Kołakowski's debates with intellectual opponents, "even if ... nothing remained of the subversive orthodoxies, nobody felt damaged in their ego or defeated in their life's project, by arguments which from any other source would have inspired the greatest indignation". Kołakowski's remains were buried in the Powązki Military Cemetery in Warsaw.

== Awards ==
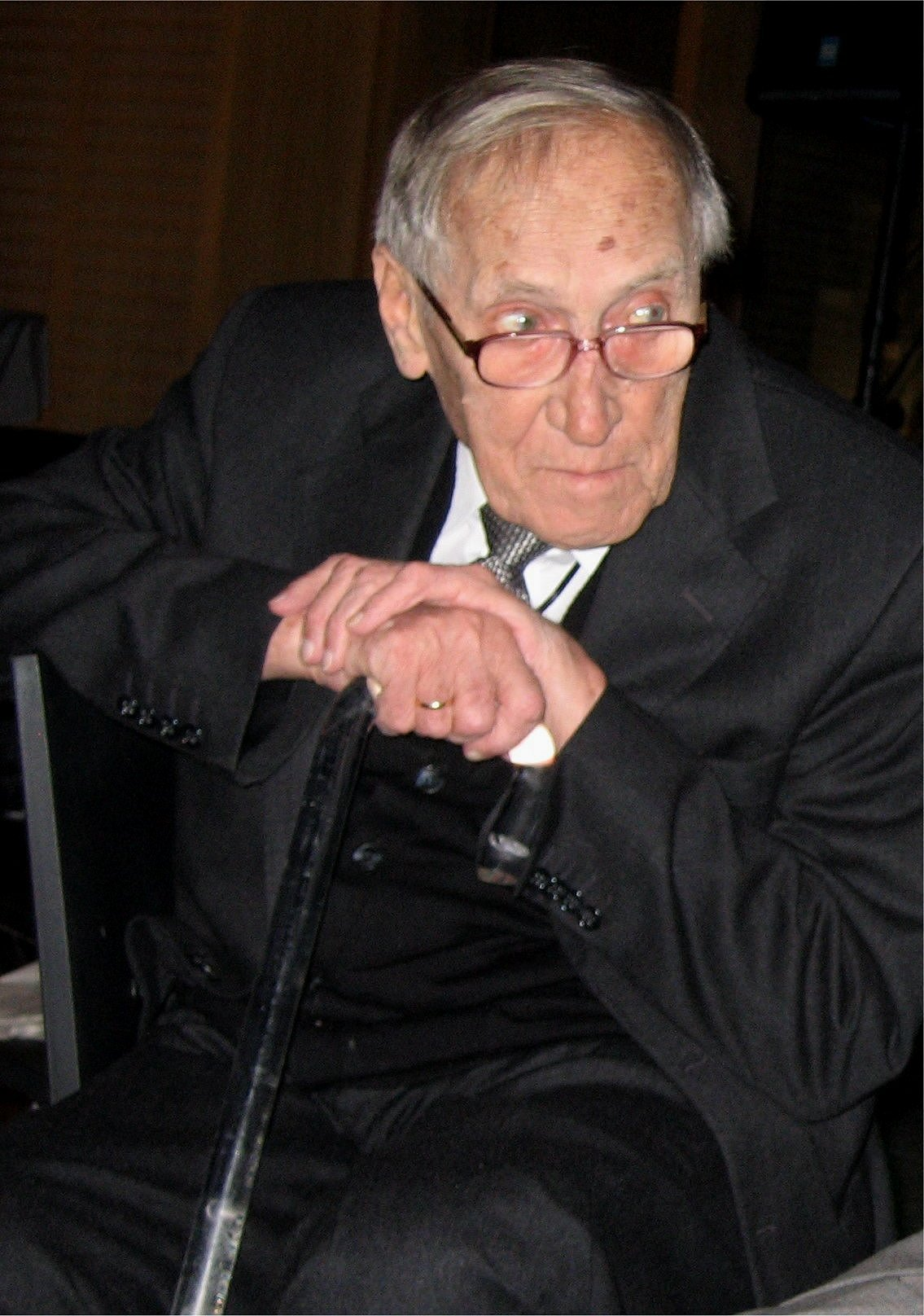
Kołakowski in 2007

In 1986, the National Endowment for the Humanities selected Kołakowski for the Jefferson Lecture. Kołakowski's lecture "The Idolatry of Politics", was reprinted in his collection of essays Modernity on Endless Trial.

In 2003, the Library of Congress named Kołakowski the first winner of the $1 million John W. Kluge Prize for Lifetime Achievement in the Humanities. When announcing the inaugural laureate of the prize, James H. Billington, the Librarian of Congress, emphasized not only Kolakowski's scholarship but also his "demonstrable importance to major political events in his own time," adding that “his voice was fundamental for the fate of Poland, and influential in Europe as a whole."

His other awards include the following:

- Jurzykowski Prize (1969)
- Peace Prize of the German Book Trade (1977)
- Veillon Foundation European Prize for the Essay (1980)
- Tanner Lectures on Human Values (1981-82)
- Erasmus Prize (1983)
- MacArthur Fellowship (1983)
- Jefferson Lecture for the National Endowment for the Humanities (1986)
- Award of the Polish Pen Club (1988)
- University of Chicago Press, Gordon J. Laing Award (1991)
- Prix Alexis de Tocqueville (1994)
- Honorary degree of the University of Gdańsk (1997)
- Order of the White Eagle (1997)
- Honorary degree of the University of Wrocław (2002)
- Kluge Prize of the Library of Congress (2003)
- St George Medal (2006)
- Honorary degree of the Central European University (2006)
- Jerusalem Prize (2007)
- Democracy Service Medal (2009)

== Works ==
- Klucz niebieski, albo opowieści budujące z historii świętej zebrane ku pouczeniu i przestrodze (The Key to Heaven), 1957
- Jednostka i nieskończoność. Wolność i antynomie wolności w filozofii Spinozy (The Individual and the Infinite: Freedom and Antinomies of Freedom in Spinoza's Philosophy), 1958
- 13 bajek z królestwa Lailonii dla dużych i małych (Tales from the Kingdom of Lailonia and the Key to Heaven), 1963. English edition: Hardcover: University of Chicago Press (October 1989). ISBN 978-0-226-45039-1.
- Rozmowy z diabłem (US title: Conversations with the Devil / UK title: Talk of the Devil; reissued with The Key to Heaven under the title The Devil and Scripture, 1973), 1965
- Świadomość religijna i więź kościelna, 1965
- Od Hume'a do Koła Wiedeńskiego (the 1st edition:The Alienation of Reason, translated by Norbert Guterman, 1966/ later as Positivist Philosophy from Hume to the Vienna Circle),
- Kultura i fetysze (Toward a Marxist Humanism, translated by Jane Zielonko Peel, and Marxism and Beyond), 1967
- A Leszek Kołakowski Reader, 1971
- Positivist Philosophy, 1971
- TriQuartely 22, 1971
- Obecność mitu (The Presence of Myth), 1972. English edition: Paperback: University of Chicago Press (January 1989). ISBN 978-0-226-45041-4.
- ed. The Socialist Idea: A Reappraisal, 1974 (with Stuart Hampshire)
- Husserl and the Search for Certitude, 1975
- Główne nurty marksizmu. First published in Polish (3 volumes) as "Główne nurty marksizmu" (Paris: Instytut Literacki, 1976) and in English (3 volumes) as "Main Currents of Marxism" (London: Oxford University Press, 1978). Current editions: Paperback (1 volume): W. W. Norton & Company (17 January 2008). ISBN 978-0393329438. Hardcover (1 volume): W. W. Norton & Company; First edition (7 November 2005). ISBN 978-0393060546.
- Czy diabeł może być zbawiony i 27 innych kazań, 1982
- Religion: If There Is No God, 1982
- Bergson, 1985
- Le Village introuvable, 1986
- Metaphysical Horror, 1988. Revised edition: Paperback: University of Chicago Press (July 2001). ISBN 978-0-226-45055-1.
- Pochwała niekonsekwencji, 1989 (ed. by Zbigniew Menzel)
- Cywilizacja na ławie oskarżonych, 1990 (ed. by Paweł Kłoczowski)
- Modernity on Endless Trial, 1990. Paperback: University of Chicago Press (June 1997). ISBN 978-0-226-45046-9. Hardcover: University of Chicago Press (March 1991). ISBN 978-0-226-45045-2.
- God Owes Us Nothing: A Brief Remark on Pascal's Religion and on the Spirit of Jansenism, 1995. Paperback: University of Chicago Press (May 1998). ISBN 978-0-226-45053-7. Hardcover: University of Chicago Press (November 1995). ISBN 978-0-226-45051-3.
- Freedom, Fame, Lying, and Betrayal: Essays on Everyday Life, 1999
- The Two Eyes of Spinoza and Other Essays on Philosophers, 2004
- My Correct Views on Everything, 2005
- Why Is There Something Rather Than Nothing?, 2007
- Is God Happy?: Selected Essays, 2012
- Jezus ośmieszony. Esej apologetyczny i sceptyczny, 2014

== See also ==
- Agnieszka Kołakowska, his daughter
- Zygmunt Bauman
- Adam Schaff
- History of philosophy in Poland
- List of Polish people – philosophy
- Poles in the United Kingdom
