= Maria Ossowska =

Polish academic

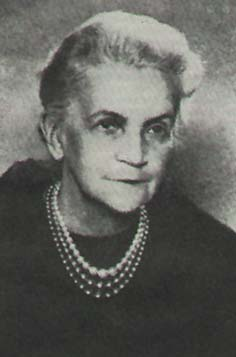
- Born: 16 January 1896; Warsaw, Vistula Country, Russian Empire
- Died: 13 August 1974 (aged 78); Warsaw, Varsovian Voivodeship, Polish People's Republic

Philosophical work
- Era: 20th-century philosophy
- Region: Western philosophy: Polish philosophy
- School: Lwów–Warsaw school
- Main interests: ethics; sociology; social philosophy
- Notable ideas: Sociology of ethics, Logoly

Maria Ossowska (née Maria Niedźwiecka, 16 January 1896, Warsaw – 13 August 1974, Warsaw) was a Polish sociologist and social philosopher.

== Life ==
A student of the philosopher Tadeusz Kotarbiński, she originally in 1925 received a doctorate in philosophy at the University of Warsaw with a thesis on Bertrand Russell. In her later work, she focused on the philosophy and sociology of ethics. Ossowska is often mentioned as a member of the Lwów–Warsaw school.

From 1941 to 1945, Ossowska taught in the Polish underground university system. In 1945-48 she was a professor at the University of Łódź, after that at the University of Warsaw. She was banned from teaching between 1952 and 1956, while sociology was removed from Polish universities as a "bourgeois" discipline. From 1952 to 1962, she directed the Institute for the History and Theory of Ethics within the Institute of Philosophy and Sociology of the Polish Academy of Sciences (PAN). In 1964 she was one of the signatories of the so-called Letter of 34 to Prime Minister Józef Cyrankiewicz regarding freedom of culture. In 1972 the Communist authorities awarded Ossowska a first-degree Polish National Award (Polska Nagroda Państwowa I stopnia), the highest Polish state accolade.

Ossowska was married to sociologist Stanisław Ossowski, with whom she closely cooperated in research and teaching.

Maria Ossowska and Stanisław Ossowski are considered among the founders of the field of "science of science" due to their authorship of a seminal 1935 paper titled "The Science of Science."

== Works ==
- 1925 (as Maria Niedźwiecka): Ontologia Bertranda Russella [The ontology of Bertrand Russell]. Warszawa.
- 1946: Wzór obywatela w ustroju demokratycznym [The model of the citizen in the democratic system]. Warszawa: Zarząd Główny Towarzystwa Uniwersytetu Robotniczego.
- 1947: Podstawy nauki o moralności [Foundations of the science of morality]. 2nd edition 1994, ed. by Paweł J. Smoczyński. Wrocław: Zakład Narodowy im. Ossolińskich. ISBN 83-04-04075-1
- 1949: Motywy postępowania: Z zagadnień moralności [The motivations of action: On the problems of ethics]. Warszawa: Książka i Wiedza. 3rd edition 2002. ISBN 83-05-13245-5
- 1956: Moralność mieszczańska [Bourgeois morality]. 2nd edition 1985. Wrocław: Zakład Narodowy im. Ossolińskich. ISBN 83-04-01877-2
  (English translation 1986: Bourgeois morality. London/New York: Routledge & Kegan Paul. ISBN 0-7100-9782-4
- 1957: O pewnych przemianach etyki walki [On certain changes in the ethics of struggle]. 2nd edition 1977. Warszawa: Niezależna Oficyna Wydawnicza (a Samisdat edition)
- 1963: Socjologia moralności: zarys zagadnień [The sociology of morality: An outline of its problems]. 4th edition 2005. Warszawa: Państwowe Wydawnictwo Naukowe. ISBN 83-01-14009-7
  English translation 1971: Social determinants of moral ideas. Philadelphia: University of Pennsylvania Press, 1971 edition London/New York: Routledge & Kegan Paul. ISBN 0-7100-7013-6
- 1966: Myśl moralna Oświecenia angielskiego [The moral thought of the English Enlightenment]. Warszawa: Państwowe Wydawnictwo Naukowe.
- 1970: Normy moralne: próba systematyzacji [Moral norms: An attempt at systematization]. 4th edition 2000. Warszawa: Państwowe Wydawnictwo Naukowe. ISBN 83-01-13278-7)
  English translation 1980: Moral norms: a tentative systematization. Warszawa: Polish Scientific Publ. ISBN 83-01-01297-8
- 1973: Ethos rycerski i jego odmiany [The Chivalric Ethos and Its Varieties], 3rd edition, 2000, Warsaw, Państwowe Wydawnictwo Naukowe, ISBN 83-01-13277-9.
- 1983: O człowieku, moralności i nauce: miscellanea [On Man, morality, and science: miscellanies, ed. by Maria Ofierska and Maria Smoła. Warszawa: Państwowe Wydawnictwo Naukowe. ISBN 83-01-00801-6
- 1992: Wzór demokraty: cnoty i wartości [The paragon of a democrat: Virtues and values] Lublin: Daimonion. ISBN 83-900135-3-3
- 2002: Intymny portret uczonych: korespondencja Marii i Stanisława Ossowskich [An intimate portrait of a scholarly couple: The correspondence of Maria Ossowska and Stanisław Ossowski], ed. by Elżbieta Neyman. Warszawa: Wydawnictwo "Sic!". ISBN 83-88807-13-7.

== See also ==
- List of Poles
- Robert K. Merton
