= Henryk Struve =

Polish philosopher

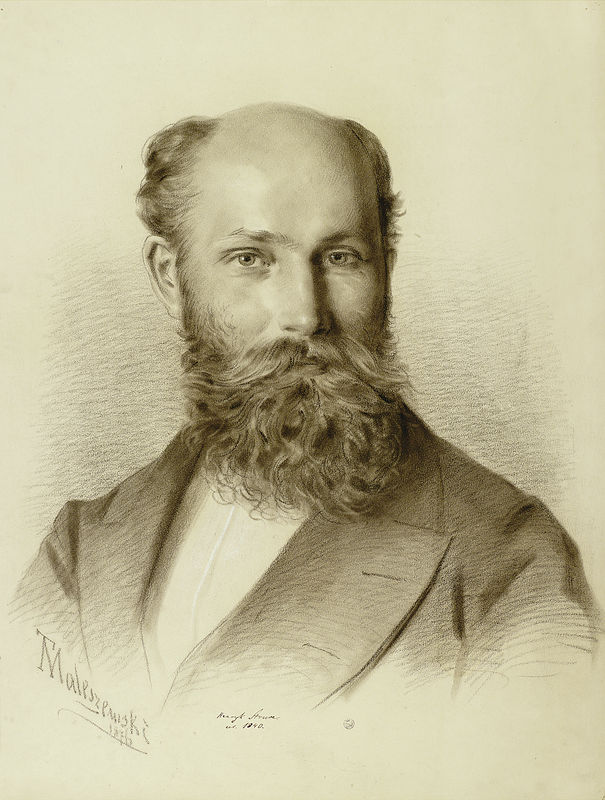
Henryk Struve, portrait by Tytus Maleszewski, 1876

Henryk Struve (also known as Florian Gąsiorowski) (1840–1912) was a Polish philosopher. He has been called "perhaps the most remarkable person in logic in Warsaw in the 19th century". Struve taught philosophy at Warsaw University from 1862 to 1903. He wrote works in Polish, German and Russian.
