= The Accumulation of Capital =

1913 book by Rosa Luxemburg

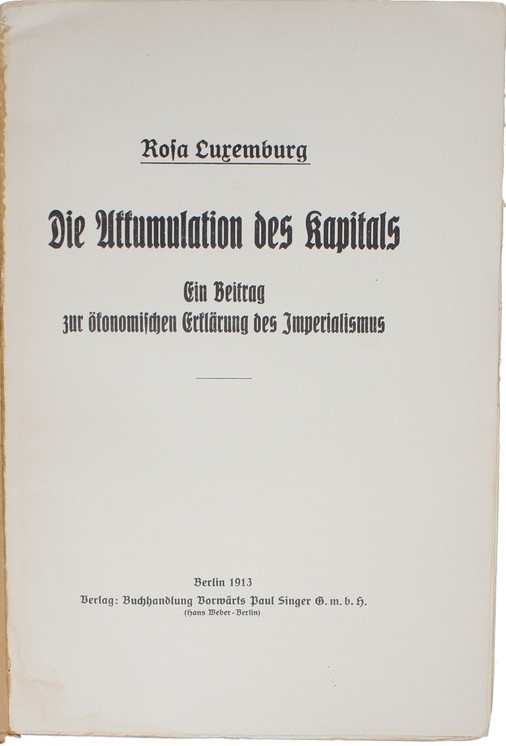
- Title page of the first edition, 1913
- Author: Rosa Luxemburg
- Original title: Die Akkumulation des Kapitals. Ein Beitrag zur ökonomischen Erklärung des Imperialismus
- Language: German
- Subject: Marxian economics, imperialism
- Published: 1913
- Publisher: Buchhandlung Vorwärts Paul Singer
- Publication place: Berlin, German Empire

The Accumulation of Capital: A Contribution to an Economic Explanation of Imperialism (German: Die Akkumulation des Kapitals. Ein Beitrag zur ökonomischen Erklärung des Imperialismus) is a 1913 book by the Marxist theorist Rosa Luxemburg. In it, Luxemburg critiques Karl Marx's theory of capitalist reproduction, arguing that capitalism requires access to non-capitalist markets and societies to solve the problem of realizing surplus value and to facilitate its expansion. She posited that this necessity for external markets drives capitalist imperialism, as advanced capitalist states are forced to violently conquer and absorb pre-capitalist areas of the world.

Luxemburg controversially concluded that once this process is complete and the entire globe operates under the capitalist mode of production, the system's internal contradictions will make further accumulation impossible, leading to its collapse. The work was written as an intervention in the contemporary Marxist debates on revisionism and imperialism and was intended to provide an economic foundation for the inevitability of capitalist crisis.

Upon its publication, The Accumulation of Capital generated fierce criticism from across the socialist movement, including from prominent Marxists such as Nikolai Bukharin and Otto Bauer. Critics accused Luxemburg of misinterpreting Marx's method, promoting a theory of underconsumptionism, and failing to understand that accumulation could be sustained internally. However, she was also hailed by others, such as Franz Mehring and Julian Marchlewski, as the most knowledgeable interpreter of Marx since Friedrich Engels. Despite the controversies, the book is considered a foundational text in Marxist theories of imperialism and has influenced later thinkers such as Michał Kalecki, Henryk Grossman, and, in the 21st century, David Harvey.

== Background ==
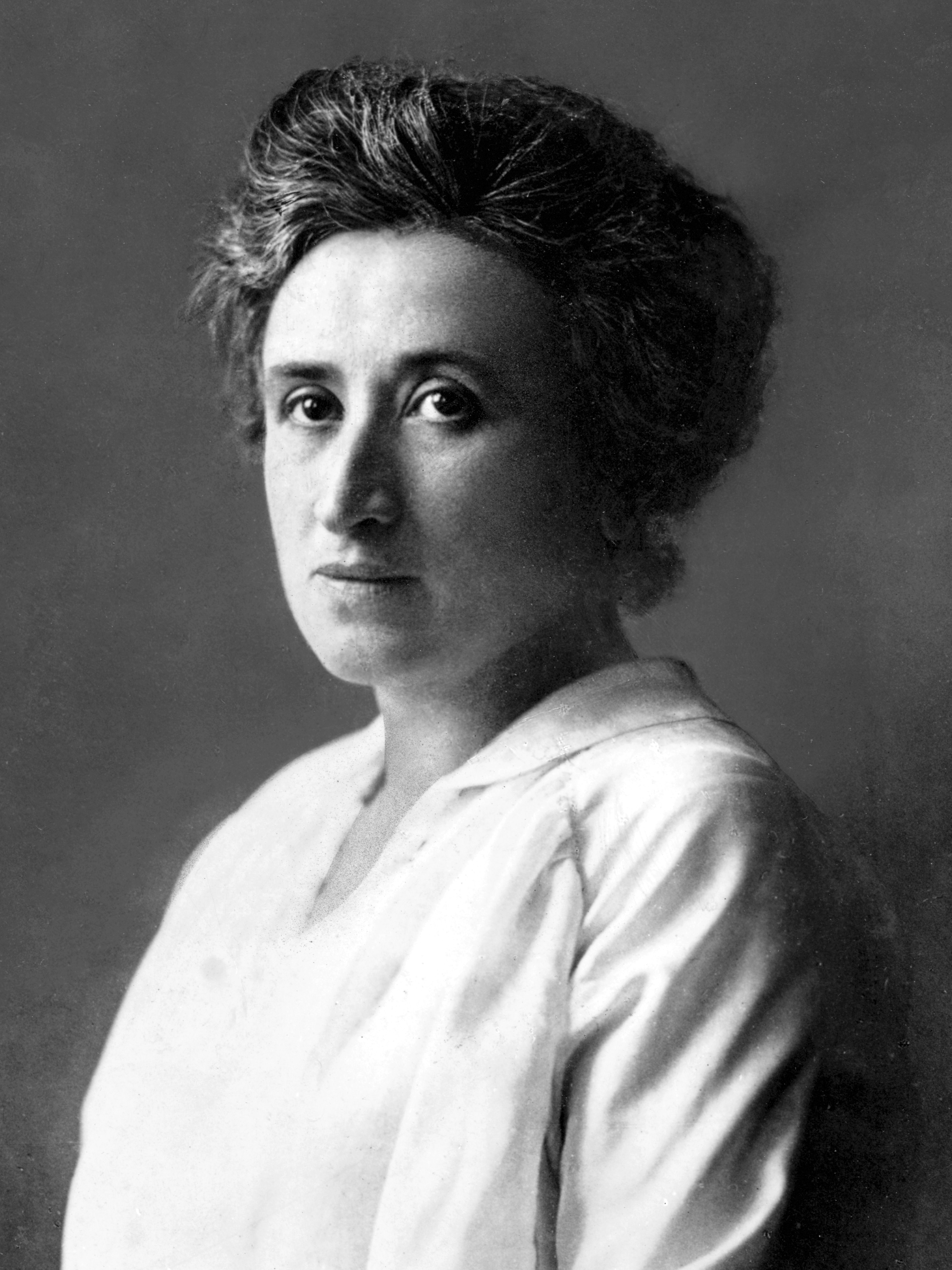
Rosa Luxemburg

Rosa Luxemburg wrote The Accumulation of Capital while teaching economics at the party school of the Social Democratic Party of Germany (SPD) between 1907 and 1914. The work was developed from her teaching material and her research for a popular textbook, Introduction to Political Economy, which she put aside after encountering what she believed was an unresolved problem in Marx's analysis. In a letter to her friend Konstantin Zetkin in November 1911, she wrote, "I want to find the cause of imperialism. I am following up the economic aspects of this concept ... it will be a strictly scientific explanation of imperialism and its contradictions." After an intensive period of research and writing that she later described as an "intellectual eruption" and "one of the happiest of my life," she completed the book in four months with the stated purpose of advancing the "practical struggle against imperialism".

The book was written in the context of intense debates within the Second International concerning revisionism, imperialism, and the future of capitalism. Thinkers like Eduard Bernstein had argued that capitalism had overcome its tendency toward crisis, while the so-called "Legal Marxists" in Russia, such as Mikhail Tugan-Baranovsky, used Marx's own reproduction schemas to argue that continuous, stable capitalist development was possible, independent of consumption. Luxemburg's work was a direct challenge to these "neo-harmonist" interpretations, aiming to re-establish the idea that capitalism had absolute economic limits and was headed for an inevitable breakdown. She felt that a proper understanding of the accumulation process was essential for grounding the socialist movement's opposition to militarism and imperialism, which she saw as direct consequences of capital's drive to expand.

== Synopsis ==
The Accumulation of Capital is primarily a theoretical work that seeks to explain the economic laws governing the expansion of the capitalist system as a whole. Luxemburg's central thesis is that capitalist accumulation cannot proceed in a "closed" system consisting only of capitalists and workers, but requires continuous interaction with non-capitalist social and economic formations.

=== Critique of Marx's reproduction schemas ===
Luxemburg begins her analysis with a critique of Marx's schemas of expanded reproduction in Volume 2 of Capital. Marx's schemas model the circulation of capital within a purely capitalist society, showing how the total output can be divided between means of production (Department I) and consumer goods (Department II) to allow for both simple replacement and expanded investment. Luxemburg argues that while these schemas correctly identify the material proportions required for growth, they fail to solve the problem of "realization"—that is, how the surplus value embodied in commodities is converted into money to be reinvested as new capital.

She points out that in a society composed solely of capitalists and workers, there is no identifiable source of demand for the portion of the social product that represents capitalized surplus value.

- The consumption of workers is limited to the value of their variable capital (wages) and can only realize the portion of the social product corresponding to that value.
- The consumption of capitalists can realize a portion of the surplus value, but to the extent that this surplus is consumed unproductively, it leads to simple, not expanded, reproduction.
- Investment by capitalists in new means of production (constant capital) appears to be a source of demand, but Luxemburg argues this merely postpones the problem. The capitalists in Department I (means of production) can sell to capitalists in Department II (consumer goods), but this only shifts the problem, as Department II must then find buyers for its own expanded output.

For Luxemburg, this creates a logical impasse in Marx's model: "Where is this continually increasing demand to come from...?" In her view, capitalists producing for other capitalists in an endless spiral represented "production for the sake of production," an "utter absurdity" from the standpoint of capital, which ultimately seeks to turn a profit in the form of money. She believed that if accumulation could proceed indefinitely within a closed system, as some of her contemporaries argued, it would mean giving up the idea of scientific socialism, as "there is no economic reason for the collapse of capitalism".

=== Problem of realization and role of non-capitalist strata ===
To solve this problem of realization, Luxemburg posits that capitalism must have access to an "outside" market composed of non-capitalist social strata and economies. These external buyers provide the effective monetary demand necessary to realize the surplus value that cannot be absorbed within the capitalist system itself. This "third market" includes peasants, artisans, and colonial societies still operating under modes of simple commodity production or natural economy, many of which Luxemburg described as forms of "primitive communism". According to Michael Löwy, part of Luxemburg's aim was to use the historical existence of these formations to challenge "the old notion of the eternal nature of private property".

Luxemburg argues that the relationship between the capitalist core and the non-capitalist periphery is twofold:

- The non-capitalist world serves as a market for the surplus commodities of the capitalist core, allowing surplus value to be realized in money form.
- It simultaneously acts as a source of supply for essential inputs, such as raw materials and cheap labour power.

This interaction is not a peaceful exchange between equals. Capitalism, in its drive to expand, actively and violently destroys these non-capitalist formations to subordinate them to its own needs, thus "unconsciously prepar[ing] its own downfall by destroying the forms on which it depends".

=== Imperialism as a necessity ===
Luxemburg directly links the economic necessity for external markets to the historical phenomenon of imperialism, which she saw as the political expression of this economic process. She argued that this process has been present since the earliest beginnings of capitalism, in the period of what Marx called "primitive capitalist accumulation", and continues with increasing velocity and violence into the modern era as a permanent feature of capitalist expansion.

This process takes several forms:

- International loans: Advanced capitalist countries provide loans to non-capitalist states, which are then used to purchase industrial goods (e.g., for railway construction) from the lending countries. This creates a market for surplus capital goods while simultaneously indebting the non-capitalist state, leading to its financial and political dependence.
- Colonial policy and militarism: Military conquest and the imposition of colonial rule are used to forcibly open markets, seize land, and extract resources. State power, through militarism and war, becomes a primary vehicle for the economic process of accumulation, with military spending itself becoming "a province of accumulation".
- Destruction of natural economy: Capitalism systematically undermines and destroys pre-capitalist modes of production, such as peasant agriculture and artisan crafts, to replace them with commodity production and create a market for its own goods. Luxemburg described this as a "relentless battle of capital against the social and economic ties of the natives," whose resistance often continued until they were "completely exhausted, or exterminated."

Adopting what Löwy calls "the viewpoint of the victims of capitalist modernization," Luxemburg details the impact of this "fundamentally inhuman and socially destructive enterprise" across the globe. Her examples include the dispossession of English peasants, the enslavement of African peoples, the extermination of Indigenous peoples in the Americas, the British incursions into China, French colonialism in Algeria, and British colonialism in India and South Africa.

Luxemburg concludes that imperialism is not merely one policy among others but is the essential final stage of capitalism. However, this process is inherently contradictory. As capitalism expands to encompass the entire globe, it progressively eliminates the very non-capitalist formations it needs for its survival. Once the world is fully capitalized, there will be no "outside" left to absorb surplus value, and the system will face its final, terminal crisis.

== The Anti-Critique ==
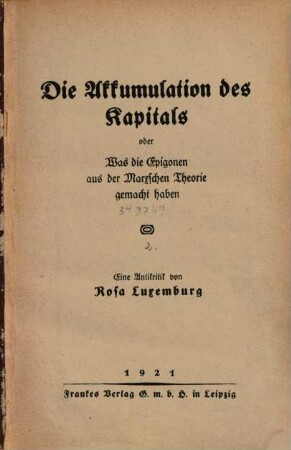
Title page of the Anti-Critique (1921, written 1915)

In 1915, while in prison during World War I, Luxemburg wrote a response to her critics titled The Accumulation of Capital, or, What the Epigones Have Made of Marx's Theory: An Anti-Critique (German: Die Akkumulation des Kapitals oder Was die Epigonen aus der Marxschen Theorie gemacht haben. Eine Antikritik). In this work, published posthumously in 1921, she defended her thesis and sharpened her arguments, framing her analysis in what has been described as a "macro-monetary" perspective. She considered the Anti-Critique more "mature" than the original and a defense of creativity against dogma.

She stressed that accumulation is not merely about producing more commodities but about converting them into "money capital". She posed the central question: "how can the total amount of money grow if its component parts are always circulating from one pocket to another?" She argued that within a closed capitalist system, any money advanced by capitalists to purchase goods (whether constant capital, luxury goods, or labour power) ultimately returns to the capitalist class as a whole. This internal circulation cannot generate the new money capital needed to realize a growing mass of surplus value. This reinforced her original conclusion that a source of demand and money external to the capitalist circuit—namely, non-capitalist producers—is indispensable for accumulation.

== Reception and criticism ==
The Accumulation of Capital was met with fierce and immediate criticism from nearly all factions of the Marxist movement. The book had an "adverse impact on the political scene," with most reviewers being less interested in her theory than in what they saw as evidence of her "unorthodox political attitudes."

=== Contemporary responses ===
With the notable exceptions of Franz Mehring and Julian Marchlewski, the book was denounced by theorists of the SPD, the Austro-Marxists, and the Bolsheviks. In 1913, at a low point in their political relationship, Vladimir Lenin read the book and dismissed it, writing that he was "very glad that Pannekoek and Eckstein and Otto Bauer have all with one accord condemned her, and said against her what I said in 1899 against the Narodniks." His critique became the "springboard for all later Communist criticism" of the work, which was soon linked to the political "heresy of Luxemburgism," based on a theory of spontaneity. Her theory was often portrayed as a kind of Narodnik or Sismondian argument that capitalism was impossible without external markets, a view Marx himself had criticized. Leninist critics were particularly suspicious of her theory because it "seemed to imply that capitalism would break down automatically," which they feared could encourage a policy of political passivity; however, Luxemburg herself never drew this conclusion.

=== Major criticisms ===
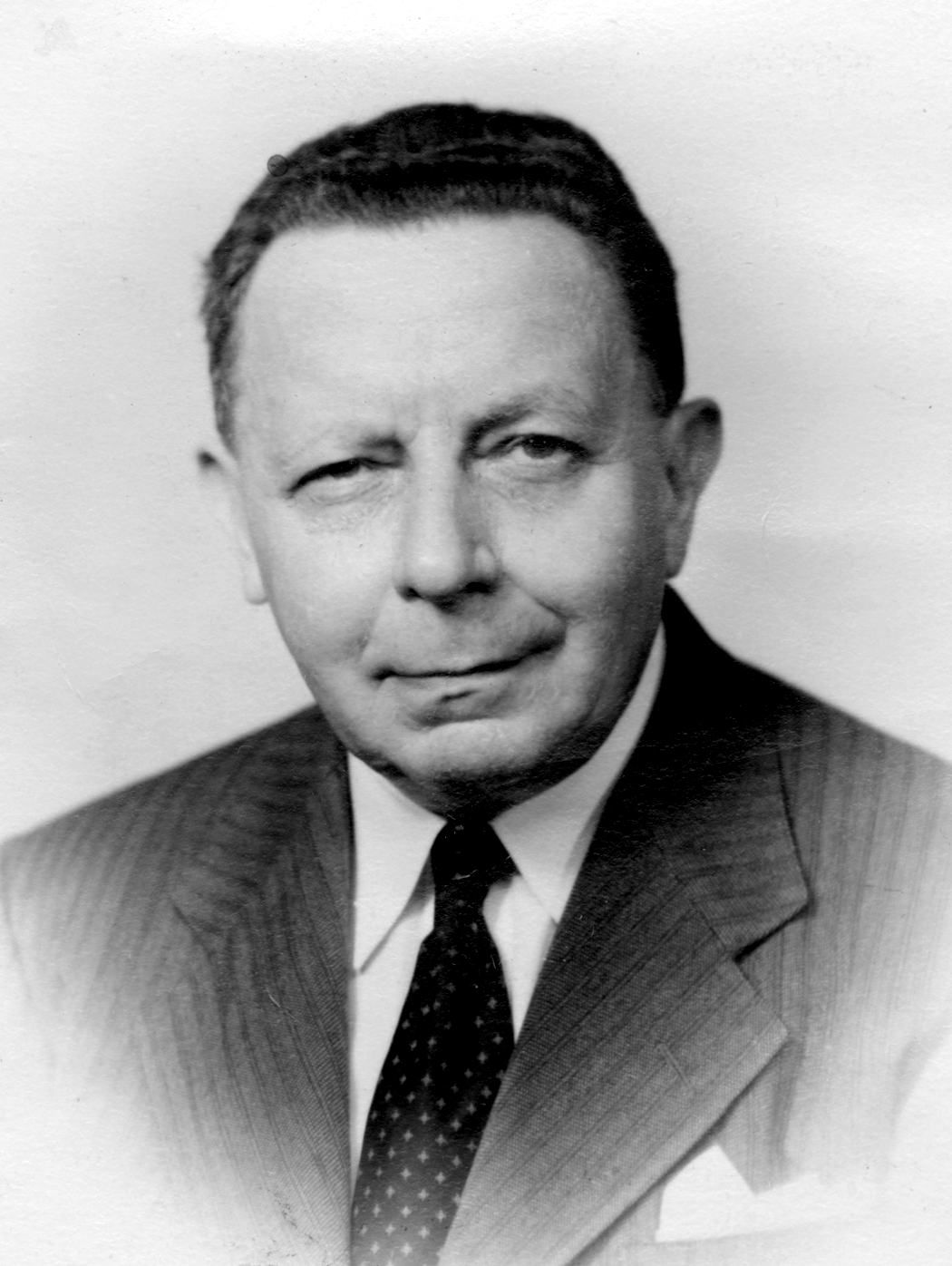
Henryk Grossman

A central criticism, articulated most forcefully by Henryk Grossman, is that Luxemburg made a fundamental methodological error. Grossman argued that she mistook Marx's abstract theoretical model in the reproduction schemas for a direct representation of empirical reality. For Grossman and other critics, the schemas were designed only to prove the possibility of reconciling value and material constraints under accumulation, not to depict the actual historical process. They were an abstraction from which the complexities of price, credit, and crisis were deliberately excluded.

Luxemburg was also widely accused of advancing a crude theory of underconsumptionism. Critics argued she failed to see that investment demand from capitalists themselves could fill the realization gap. According to this view, production of means of production is not for the "absurd" sake of production itself, but because it is the necessary means for the valorization and accumulation of capital.

Nikolai Bukharin argued that Luxemburg's entire problem was based on a misunderstanding of capitalist motivation. He contended that the consumption of workers is, for capital, nothing more than part of the production of labour-power, which is itself a precondition for accumulation. The demand for the expanded product comes from the investment process itself: additional constant capital is demand for the means of production, and additional variable capital (wages for newly employed workers) is demand for consumer goods. In her Anti-Critique, Luxemburg scornfully referred to this as "the roundabout that revolves around itself in empty space". Bukharin also famously attacked what he called her "atrocious conception" of accumulation as merely the amassing of money capital, rather than the expansion of productive capacity.

While sympathetic to Luxemburg's aim of proving the existence of objective limits to capitalism, Grossman rejected her explanation. He argued that the true barrier to accumulation was not a lack of effective demand (a realization problem) but the tendency of the rate of profit to fall (a production problem). Grossman praised Luxemburg for seeing that capitalism had absolute limits but maintained that she had located them in the sphere of circulation rather than production, where Marx had placed them.

Leszek Kołakowski describes the book as an "ideological weapon" based on a "doctrinaire fidelity to the concept of iron historical laws that no human agency could bend or break." According to him, Luxemburg's theory rested on several assumptions that were either unreal or disproved by later events. These include:

1. The assumption that wages under capitalism must always remain at a subsistence level, which prevented workers' consumption from expanding as a source of demand.
2. The assumption of a simple two-class society of capitalists and workers, which ignored the growth of "non-productive" strata (in administration, services, etc.) whose consumption, paid out of wages or surplus value, could affect the realization of surplus value.
3. The assumption that the state, being controlled by the bourgeoisie, could not independently regulate the process of accumulation or enlarge the internal market through its own policies. Later experience showed that the state could and did play this role.
4. The assumption that the entire volume of goods exported to non-capitalist markets contributes to the realization of surplus. As Michał Kalecki later observed, what matters for realizing profits is the excess of exports over imports.

=== Later assessments ===
Later scholars have offered more nuanced interpretations of Luxemburg's work. Riccardo Bellofiore argues that her critics failed to appreciate the "macro-monetary" nature of her analysis, particularly her focus on the necessity of realizing value as money and the role of finance in the accumulation process. Andrew Trigg suggests that, despite its flaws, her work performed a "great service to political economy by emphasizing the importance of demand" and by questioning the purpose of accumulation in Marx's abstract models. Jan Toporowski positions Luxemburg as a "pioneer of critical finance," arguing that her analysis of international loans anticipated later theories of financial instability and the exploitative relationship between financial centers and developing nations.

Some biographers, such as Gilbert Badia, have argued that she presented an overly rigid "black-and-white contrast with capitalism," in which pre-capitalist societies were "endowed with every virtue and conceived as virtually immobile." Michael Löwy disputes this, arguing that Luxemburg did not idealize these communities but showed their internal contradictions, transformations, and historical limitations, such as their "locally restricted outlooks, a low level of labor productivity... brutal violence, [and] a permanent state of war between communities".

In the 21st century, the book has been revisited by scholars examining contemporary issues such as neoliberalism, post-colonialism, and feminist economics. The philosopher Michael Brie has linked the crises of neoliberal financial capitalism to Luxemburg's analysis of the limits of capitalist expansion. Others have explored the book's implications for post-colonial theory. While some, like Kanishka Chowdhury and Helen Scott, highlight Luxemburg's framework for understanding capitalist violence and international solidarity, they also note her limitations, such as a linear view of history and a failure to see colonized peoples as agents of their own progress. Paul Le Blanc has noted that Luxemburg's theory of a perpetual need to violate "unspoiled" non-capitalist territories can be extended to understand capital's invasion of "noncapitalist" territories within capitalist societies, such as public services (transportation, education, healthcare), which are increasingly subject to privatization and commodification. David Harvey has applied a similar logic in his study of "the urban commons", analyzing how capital accumulation shapes and reshapes cities for profit.

Feminist scholars have re-engaged with The Accumulation of Capital to theorize social reproduction. Thinkers like Ankica Čakardić have extended Luxemburg's core argument, identifying the household as a modern non-capitalist sphere that capitalism requires for its expansion through the exploitation of domestic labor. This aligns her work with contemporary Marxist feminist theories like Wages for Housework. Earlier, Marxist-humanist Raya Dunayevskaya had also claimed Luxemburg as a feminist in both theory and practice in her 1982 work Rosa Luxemburg, Women's Liberation, and Marx's Philosophy of Revolution. The political theorist Hannah Arendt, though critical of what she termed "Luxemburgism," engaged seriously with The Accumulation of Capital, keeping a summary and a list of its various editions in her personal library.

== Legacy and influence ==
Despite its controversial reception, The Accumulation of Capital has had a significant and lasting influence on Marxist thought. Her insistence on the necessity of external markets was taken up by later dependency theorists and analysts of the relationship between the capitalist "core" and "periphery". The idea of an alliance between the anti-colonial struggles of pre-capitalist societies and the modern anti-capitalist workers' movement, hinted at in Luxemburg's work, was later explicitly formulated by the Peruvian Marxist José Carlos Mariátegui. Similarly, Luxemburg's analysis of "permanent primitive accumulation" continues to inform modern Indigenous and peasant struggles against dispossession by oil and mining companies.

The book was an important stimulus for Henryk Grossman's own work on capitalist breakdown theory. It also had a notable influence on the Polish economist Michał Kalecki. While finding both Luxemburg's and Tugan-Baranovsky's rival theories to be erroneous, Kalecki believed they "helped to illustrate certain features of economic growth under capitalism". He adapted Luxemburg's concept of an "external market" to analyse the role of government deficit spending, particularly on armaments, in solving the problem of effective demand in advanced capitalist countries. He saw this as a modern, internal equivalent to the external, non-capitalist markets that Luxemburg had identified.

Luxemburg's theory of imperialism, while distinct from Lenin's more influential Imperialism, the Highest Stage of Capitalism, continues to be a key reference point in debates on globalization, neocolonialism, and the dynamics of the world capitalist system. Joseph Halevi argues that while her specific model does not fit the trajectory of post-war US imperialism, her underlying framework for understanding the violent and expansionist nature of capital remains relevant.

== See also ==
- The Wealth of Nations
- Protectionism
