= Veo =

Veo or VEO may refer to:

- Veo (company), an American micromobility company
- Veo (planthopper), an insect genus in the Delphacini tribe
- Veo (text-to-video model), a model developed by Google DeepMind
- Veo, Iowa, U.S.
- Veo River, in Alcudia de Veo, Spain
- Veo Easley (1932–2003), American accountant, judge, and businessman
- VEO of Russia, a scientific NGO
- Vostochno Evropeiskaya Ovcharka, or East-European Shepherd, a dog breed
- Ventureño language (ISO 639-3 code)

== See also ==
- Veo7, a cinema television network made by Unidad Editorial
- Veoh, a defunct video streaming website
