= Gregory Grossman =

American economist

- Born: July 5, 1921; Kiev, Ukrainian Soviet Socialist Republic, Soviet Union
- Died: August 14, 2014 (aged 93)
- Employer: University of California, Berkeley
- Known for: Introduction of the terms "second economy" and "command economy"

Academic background
- Education: University of California, Berkeley (BA); Harvard University (PhD)

Academic work
- Discipline: Soviet economy, command economy, informal economy
- Awards: Lifetime Achievement Award, Association for Slavic, East European, and Eurasian Studies (1991)

Gregory Grossman (July 5, 1921, Kiev – August 14, 2014) was the professor emeritus at UC Berkeley and an authority on the economy of the Soviet Union. He is credited with the introduction of the terms "second economy" and "command economy".

He received his undergraduate degree in economics from Berkeley in 1942 and his Ph.D. in economics from Harvard University in 1952. He spent his entire career, 1952–1993, at Berkeley.

He received the lifetime achievement award from the American Association for the Advancement of Slavic Studies in 1991.

The term "command economy" was introduced in his seminal 1963 article Notes for a Theory of the Command Economy. The term "second economy" was introduced in his another article, The Second Economy of the USSR (1977).

He supervised the English translation by Arthur and Claora Levin of The Russian Factory in the Nineteenth Century the PhD thesis of the Legal Marxist Mikhail Tugan Baranovsky first published in Russian in 1898. The English edition was published in 1970.

== Publications ==
- Grossman, G. 1963: Notes for a theory of the Command Economy. Soviet Studies XV(2): 101–123.
- Grossman, G. 1976?: Economic Systems (translated into Dutch as Economische stelsels, 1976)
- Grossman, G. 1977: The second economy of the USSR. Problems of Communism. September—October; reprinted in: Tanzi, V (ed), The Underground Economy in the United States and Abroad, Lexington: Lexington, MA.
