= Zhizn =

Defunct Russian magazine

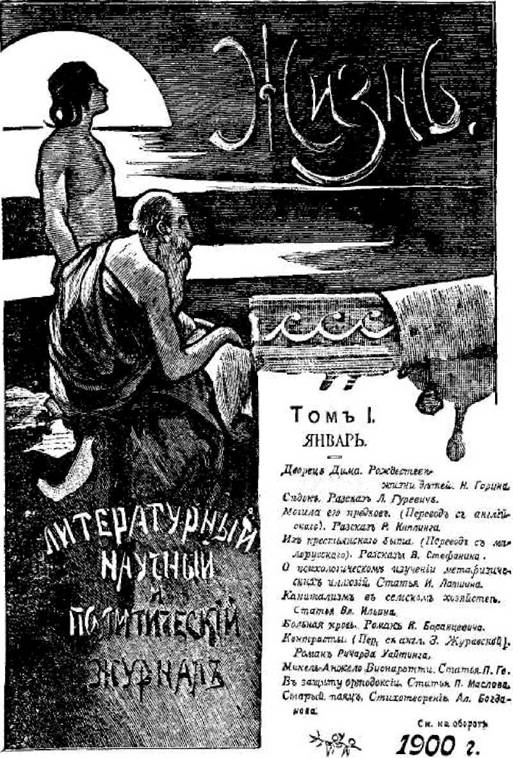
Обложка журанал Жизнь 1900

Zhizn (Russian: Жизнь, romanized: Žiznj, IPA: [ˈʐɨzʲnʲ] , lit. 'Life') was a Russian magazine published first in Saint Petersburg (1897–1901), then in London and Geneva (1902).

== History ==
Zhizn began as a general purpose magazine in January 1897. For the first two years it was edited, at various times, by S. V. Voejkov, D. M. Ostafyev, M. V. Kalitin, and M. S. Ermolaev and was published three times a month. In early 1899, the magazine was taken over by the socialist journalist Vladimir Posse, who changed the magazine to a monthly in April 1899. Although at first Posse stood between Marxists and narodniks (populists), he converted Zhizn into a flagship Legal Marxist publication after the suppression of the Legal Marxists' magazine Nachalo in June 1899.

The magazine's editorial policy was largely under the control of Peter Struve and Mikhail Tugan-Baranovsky, two leaders of the Legal Marxists. Like Nachalo, Zhizn was supportive of Eduard Bernstein's revision of Marxism and its editors were on the verge of moving from Marxism to liberalism, but the magazine continued to publish articles by revolutionary Marxists like Vladimir Lenin. Maxim Gorky, a friend of Posse's, served as the editor of the magazine's literary section and Anton Chekhov's famous story "In the Ravine" in January 1900. Other writers like Vikenty Veresayev contributed to the magazine as well.

At first the government assigned the notorious censor Nikolay Elagin to Zhizn, who banned two thirds of the content, but then a new censor, Vorshev, was assigned, who took a hands off approach:

You know, Vladimir Aleksandrovich, I am an old man and I poorly understand the latest literary and political trends, and it's hard for me to decide under current conditions what to permit and what not to permit. I will sign everything that you put in front of me, but I ask you not to let me down and to exercise the greatest caution.

The magazine was, in effect, self-censored for three or four months, but eventually the government reinstated Elagin and censorship problems returned. The government finally closed the magazine down in April 1901 when it found out about revolutionary socialists (supposedly Boris Savinkov, Gariushin and Tatarov) using the magazine's offices for their secret meetings.

Later in 1901, Posse moved to Ireland and then to London and began looking for a way to resume publication of the magazine, this time free of censorship. Although Ariadna Tyrkova-Williams (then Ariadna Borman)'s mission to Gorky, who was living in exile in Yalta at the time, in November 1901 proved unsuccessful, Posse eventually formed the "Zhizn Social-Democratic Group" with V. D. Velichkina and Vladimir Bonch-Bruevich, who provided financial and distribution support. The group published another 5 issues of Zhizn in London between April and August 1902. The last issue, "September–December 1902", was published in Geneva in December 1902. This foreign-published version of Zhizn was increasingly opposed to the more radical version of Marxism espoused by Georgy Plekhanov, Lenin and other supporters of the rival social democratic newspapers Iskra and Zarya.

Twelve issues of a companion magazine, Listki Zhizni (lit. 'Life Leaflets') were published by Posse (as "F. Rosin") in London between 15 May 1902 (Gregorian calendar) and 12 December 1902 as a "non-factional Social-Democratic organ". Several volumes in an irregular "Zhizn Library" series were also published in 1902.

The "Zhizn Social-Democratic Group" ceased to exist and publication stopped when Bonch-Bruevich had a falling out with Posse and left the group, joining Iskra and taking his distribution network with him. Bonch-Bruevich also transferred 19 manuscripts from Zhizn's portfolio to Iskra against the wishes of the "Zhizn Social-Democratic Group", which caused a controversy in early 1903.

== Notes ==
- See Maxim Gorky. Selected Letters, tr. and ed. by Andrew Barratt and Barry P. Scherr, Oxford University Press, 1997, ISBN 0-19-815175-6 p. 49
- For an account of the story's appearance in Zhizn, see Gleb Struve's notes in A. P. Chekhov. Seven Short Novels, Bantam Books, 1963, Norton paperback reissue 2003, ISBN 0-393-00552-6 p. 396.
- Quoted in Charles A. Ruud, "Russia" in The War for the Public Mind: Political Censorship in Nineteenth-Century Europe, ed. Robert Justin Goldstein, Westport, CT, Praeger Publishers, 2000, ISBN 0-275-96461-2 p. 252
- Posse's version of the events differs from Maxim Gorky's version. For the latter see Gorky's letter #153 to I. A. Gruzdev in Maxim Gorky. Selected Letters, tr. and ed. by Andrew Barratt and Barry P. Scherr, Oxford University Press, 1997, ISBN 0-19-815175-6 p. 323
- See Maxim Gorky. Selected Letters, op. cit. p. 74, footnote 3
- See Gorky's letter to Posse dated late November 1901, in Gorky. Sobranie sochinenij, GIHL, Moscow, 1949–1956, in 30 volumes, letter 174.
- See Russian Revolutionary Literature at Primary Source Microfilm's Online Guides
- See Russian Revolutionary Literature at Primary Source Microfilm's Online Guides
- See Lenin's letter to Plekhanov dated December 15, 1902 in Lenin. Collected Works, Progress Publishers, [1977], Moscow, Volume 43, pages 98–99.
- See Vladimir Lenin's letter to Bonch-Bruevich dated January 1, 1903 in Lenin. Collected Works, Progress Publishers, [1977], Moscow, Volume 43, page 102.
