= Nachalo =

Defunct Russian magazine

Nachalo (Russian: «Начало», romanized: Načalo, IPA: [nɐˈtɕaɫə] , lit. 'The Beginning') was a Russian Marxist monthly magazine published in Saint Petersburg in 1899.

== Origins ==
When Novoye Slovo, the flagship magazine of the Saint Petersburg-based Legal Marxists, was suppressed by the Czarist government in December 1897, their leaders began planning a new magazine. At first, the idea was to have Vladimir Posse (who was close to the Legal Marxists as well as to the narodnik populists) take over Zhizn (Life), a moderate populist magazine, and use it as a platform for Legal Marxism. However, when Posse became Zhizn's editor in early 1899, the Legal Marxists' plans suddenly changed and they started their own magazine, Nachalo, in January 1899.

== History ==
Nachalo's editorial board consisted of Peter Struve, Mikhail Tugan-Baranovsky, V. G. Veresayev, V. Ya. Bogucharsky, and A. M. Kalmykova. Contributors included Legal Marxists as well as revolutionary Marxists living in exile or abroad like Georgy Plekhanov, Vladimir Lenin, Leon Trotsky and Vera Zasulich. In all, there were five issues published between January and May 1899, although the April issue was confiscated by the censors. Starting with issue 2, the magazine was supportive of Eduard Bernstein's revision of Marxism, which caused frictions with Plekhanov, an opponent of Bernstein's and the leader of orthodox Marxism in Russia.

The editors also made an attempt to build up a literary section in collaboration with Anton Chekhov and Russian Symbolists, but were unsuccessful, which made them turn to Maxim Gorky and early Russian Modernists. The magazine was closed down by the government in June 1899, and the Legal Marxists were forced to join Posse's Zhizn as originally planned.

There was a Marxist journal with the same name in 1906, referred to by Lenin in his Report On The Unity Congress Of The R.S.D.L.P., written in May 1906. Lenin says that "Comrades Parvus and Trotsky" were associated with this paper.

== Influences ==
The last issue (1972) of the Situationist International magazine, featured an editorial analyzing the events of May 1968. The editorial, written by Guy Debord, was title The Beginning of an Era, probably as a detournement reference of Nachalo (The Beginning).

== Notes ==
- See Maxim Gorky's letter to Chekhov dated ca. January 13, 1899 in Maxim Gorky. Selected Letters, tr. and ed. by Andrew Barratt and Barry P. Scherr, Oxford University Press, 1997, ISBN 0-19-815175-6 pp. 33–34
