= Michał Kalecki =

Polish economist (1899–1970)

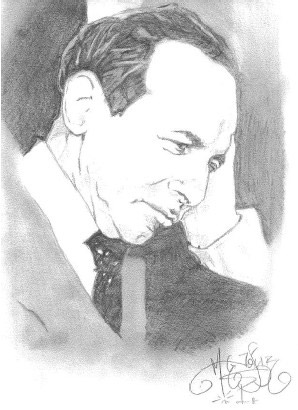
- Born: 22 June 1899; Łódź, Congress Poland
- Died: 18 April 1970 (aged 70); Warsaw, Polish People's Republic

Academic background
- Education: Gdańsk Polytechnic
- Influences: François Quesnay, Karl Marx, Knut Wicksell, Mikhail Tugan-Baranovsky, Rosa Luxemburg, Joseph Schumpeter

Academic work
- Discipline: Macroeconomics
- School or tradition: Neo-Marxian economics Post-Keynesian economics
- Notable ideas: Business cycle theory, monetary theory, profit equation, theories of mark-up and effective demand

Michał Kalecki (Polish: [ˈmixaw kaˈlɛt͡skʲi]; 22 June 1899 – 18 April 1970) was a Polish Marxian economist. Over the course of his life, Kalecki worked at the London School of Economics, University of Cambridge, University of Oxford, and Warsaw School of Economics, and was an economic advisor to the governments of Poland, France, Cuba, Israel, Mexico, and India. He also served as the deputy director of the United Nations Economic Department in New York City.

Kalecki has been called "one of the most distinguished economists of the 20th century" and "likely the most original one". It is often claimed that he developed many of the same ideas as John Maynard Keynes before Keynes but remains much less known to the English-speaking world. He offered a synthesis that integrated class analysis of Marxism and the new literature on oligopoly theory, and his work had a significant influence on both the neo-Marxian (Monopoly Capital) and post-Keynesian schools of economic thought. He was one of the first macroeconomists to apply mathematical models and statistical data to economic questions. Being also a political economist and a person of left-wing convictions, Kalecki emphasized the social aspects and consequences of economic policies.

Kalecki made major theoretical and practical contributions in the areas of the business cycle, economic growth, full employment, income distribution, the political boom cycle, the oligopolistic economy, and risk. Among his other significant interests were monetary issues, economic development, finance, interest, and inflation. In 1970, Kalecki was nominated for the Nobel Memorial Prize in Economics but died the same year.

== Biography ==
=== Early years: 1899–1933 ===
Michał Kalecki was born on 22 June 1899 in Łódź, Congress Poland, then part of the Russian Empire, to a middle-class Ashkenazi Jewish family. Information about his early years is very sparse, part of it being lost during the German occupation. He grew up in a major labor-turbulent industrial center, which affected his future views. In 1917 Kalecki enrolled at the Warsaw Polytechnic to study civil engineering. He was a very able student and formalized a generalization of Pascal's theorem, concerning a hexagon drawn within a second-degree curve: Kalecki generalized it for a polygon of 2n sides. Because his father lost a small textile workshop, Kalecki was forced to work as an accountant. During his first year in Warsaw he continued working sporadically and precariously. After finishing his first year of engineering studies, he had to interrupt his studies from 1918 to 1921 to complete military service. Upon leaving the military he joined Gdańsk Polytechnic, where he stayed until 1923, but because of the family financial situation had to leave the institution just before graduating.

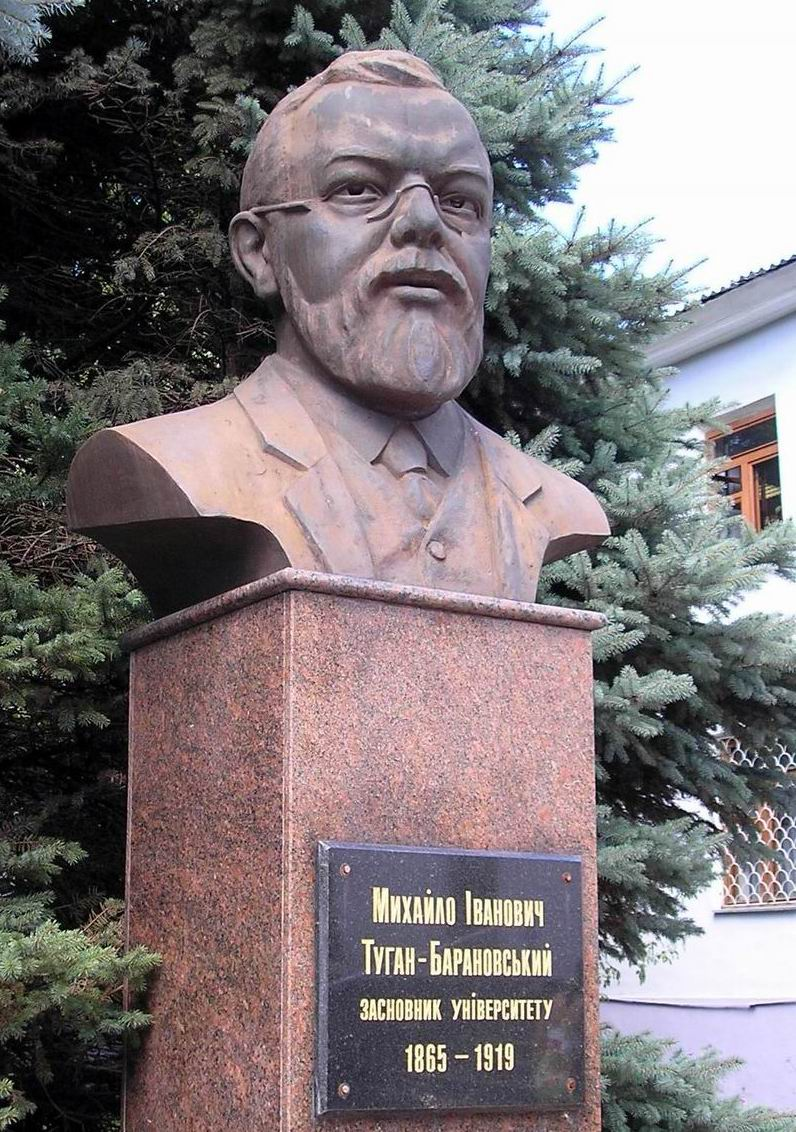
Statue of Mikhail Tugan-Baranovsky, near Donetsk Commercial University. Tugan-Baranovsky was one of the few economists read by the young Kalecki

During these years he first approached economics, although informally. He read mostly "unorthodox" works, particularly those of Mikhail Tugan-Baranovsky and Rosa Luxemburg. Years later they influenced some of his writings related to the potential growth of a capitalist system. Having to enter the job market full-time, Kalecki abandoned his formal studies for good. His first job was to collect data on companies seeking credit. In this same period he tried unsuccessfully to start a newspaper, but instead ended up writing articles for two existing periodicals, Polska gospodarcza ('Economic Poland') and Przegląd gospodarczy ('The Economic Review'). Probably when writing these articles he began to acquire skills in obtaining and analyzing empirical information, which he later used in his professional works. In 1929 Kalecki applied for work at the Institute of Research on Business Cycles and Prices (Instytut Badania Koniunktur Gospodarczych i Cen) in Warsaw and obtained a job there because of his ability to use statistics. He stayed there for seven years.

On 18 June 1930, Kalecki married Ada Szternfeld. At the Institute he met Ludwik Landau, whose knowledge of statistics influenced Kalecki's work. His first publications were of a practical character and were concerned with establishing relationships between macro-magnitudes. The first article that anticipated many subsequent contributions was published in 1932 in Przegląd socjalistyczny ('The Socialist Review') magazine, under the pseudonym Henryk Braun. The article dealt with the impact of wage cuts during an economic downturn.

=== Revolution of Kalecki and Keynes: 1933–1939 ===
In 1933 Kalecki wrote Próba teorii koniunktury ('An Attempt at the Theory of the Business Cycle'), an essay that brought together many of the issues that dominated his thought for the rest of his life. In the essay Kalecki for the first time developed a comprehensive theory of business cycles. The foundations of his macroeconomic theory of effective demand presented in the paper anticipated similar ideas published three years later by John Maynard Keynes in The General Theory of Employment, Interest and Money. According to Lawrence Klein (1951), Kalecki "created a system that contains everything of importance in the Keynesian system, in addition to other contributions". In an introduction to the essay's 1966 English translation, Joan Robinson wrote: "Its sharp and concentrated statement provides a better introduction to the general theory of employment, interest and money than any that has yet been produced."

Except for a small number of economists (in particular econometricians) familiar with his work, Kalecki's contributions, originally in Polish, failed to gain recognition. In October 1933 he read his essay to the International Econometrics Association in Leiden and in 1935 published it in two major journals: Revue d'Economie Politique and Econometrica. Readers of neither journal were particularly impressed, but the article received favourable comments from such leading economists as Ragnar Frisch and Jan Tinbergen.

In 1936 Kalecki protested the politically motivated actions taken by the Institute of Research against his colleagues, including Landau. Kalecki resigned, and having been granted a Rockefeller Foundation's Traveling Fellowship, proceeded to work abroad.

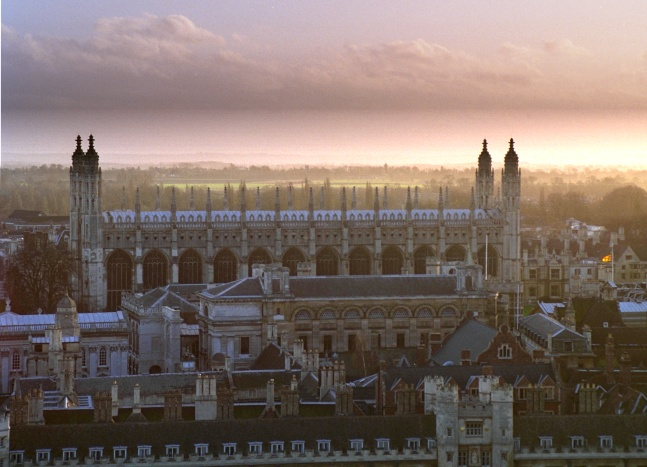
Trinity College, Cambridge

The scholarship enabled Kalecki to travel with his wife to Sweden, where followers of Knut Wicksell were trying to formalize a theory similar to Kalecki's. In Sweden in 1936 he learnt of the publication of Keynes's General Theory. Kalecki was working on a comprehensive elaboration of the economic ideas he had previously developed, but having found in Keynes's book much of what he was going to say, he interrupted his work and traveled to England. He first visited the London School of Economics and afterward went to Cambridge. Thus began his friendships with Richard Kahn, Joan Robinson and Piero Sraffa, which left an indelible mark on all of them. In 1937 Kalecki met Keynes. The meeting was cool and Keynes kept aloof. Although the conclusions they had reached in their work were very similar, their characters could not have been more different. Kalecki graciously neglected to mention that he had a priority of publication. As Joan Robinson stated:

"Michal Kalecki's claim to priority of publication is indisputable. With proper scholarly dignity (which, however, is unfortunately rather rare among scholars) he never mentioned this fact. And, indeed, except for the authors concerned, it is not particularly interesting to know who first got into print. The interesting thing is that two thinkers, from completely different political and intellectual starting points, should come to the same conclusion. For us in Cambridge it was a great comfort."

Later Kalecki always acknowledged that the "Keynesian Revolution" was an appropriate name for the movement in economics, as he realized the importance of Keynes's established position, the recognition Keynes enjoyed and his decisive role in the promotion and causing eventual acceptance of the ideas that Kalecki pioneered.

In 1939 Kalecki wrote one of his most important works, Essays in the Theory of Economic Fluctuations. Although his conception changed through the years, all the essential elements of Kaleckian economics were already present in this work: in a sense his subsequent publications would consist of mere elaborations on the ideas propounded here.

While Kalecki was generally enthusiastic about the Keynesian Revolution, in his article Political Aspects of Full Employment, which Anatole Kaletsky called one of the most prescient economic papers ever published, he predicted it would not endure. Kalecki believed that the full employment delivered by Keynesian policy would eventually lead to a more assertive working class and weakening of the social position of business leaders, causing the elite to react to the erosion of their political power and force a displacement of that policy, in spite of profits being higher than under a laissez-faire system.^{[a]}

=== World War II years: 1939–1945 ===
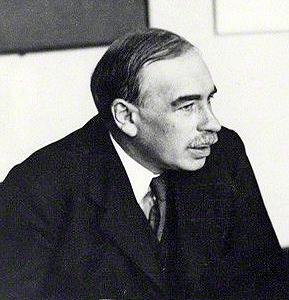
During his stay in England, Kalecki met John Maynard Keynes (pictured) and discussed with him some of the ideas they shared

Kalecki was hired by the Oxford Institute of Statistics (OIS) early in 1940. His job there consisted mainly of writing statistical and economic analysis for the British government of the management of war economy. Occasionally he gave lectures at Oxford University. The elaborate reports Kalecki prepared for the government were chiefly about the rationing of goods, and the scheme he developed was very close to the policies adopted later when rationing was introduced. According to George Feiwel, "Kalecki's work of the war period is far less known than it deserves to be".

Several of Kalecki's wartime articles were devoted to the subject of inflation. He argued, on economic grounds, against the government's efforts to suppress inflation by official regulation of prices and by government wage stabilization (freezing of wages), recommending in each case economic rationing instead (especially the full rationing system rather than the wage stabilization program).

Some of Kalecki's major works were written during this period. In 1943 he produced two articles, one dealing with new additions to the traditional business cycle theory, and one presenting his completely original theory of business cycles caused by political events. The latter was published in 1944 and was based on the premise of full employment. It was a compilation of studies by Kalecki and his colleagues at the OIS, who were strongly influenced by Kalecki'.

In 1945 Kalecki left the OIS because he felt his talents were insufficiently appreciated. He displayed great modesty about his work and did not expect a high salary, but was offended at being discriminated against on account of his immigrant status. One reason he was not appointed to a more senior position was that he had not applied to become a British subject.

=== Postwar years: 1945–1955 ===
Kalecki went to Paris for a while, then moved to Montreal, where he stayed for fifteen months working at the International Labour Office. In July 1946 he accepted the Polish government's invitation to head the Central Planning Office of the Ministry of Economics, but he left some months later. By the end of 1946, he assumed the job of Deputy Director in the Department of Economic Affairs of the United Nations Secretariat in New York. He remained there until 1955, mainly preparing the World Economic Reports. Kalecki resigned that position as a result of McCarthyist pressures. It was argued that he was punished on political grounds (a non-merited economic planner stance was attributed to him). He became depressed by Senator Joseph McCarthy's witch-hunt, as many of his close friends were directly affected. Denounced in the US Senate as a supporter of communism, Kalecki ultimately failed to achieve professional success in the US (although he influenced the future post-Keynesians there), unlike in England, where he had a large following and was supported especially by his friend Joan Robinson.

=== In communist Poland: 1955–1968 ===
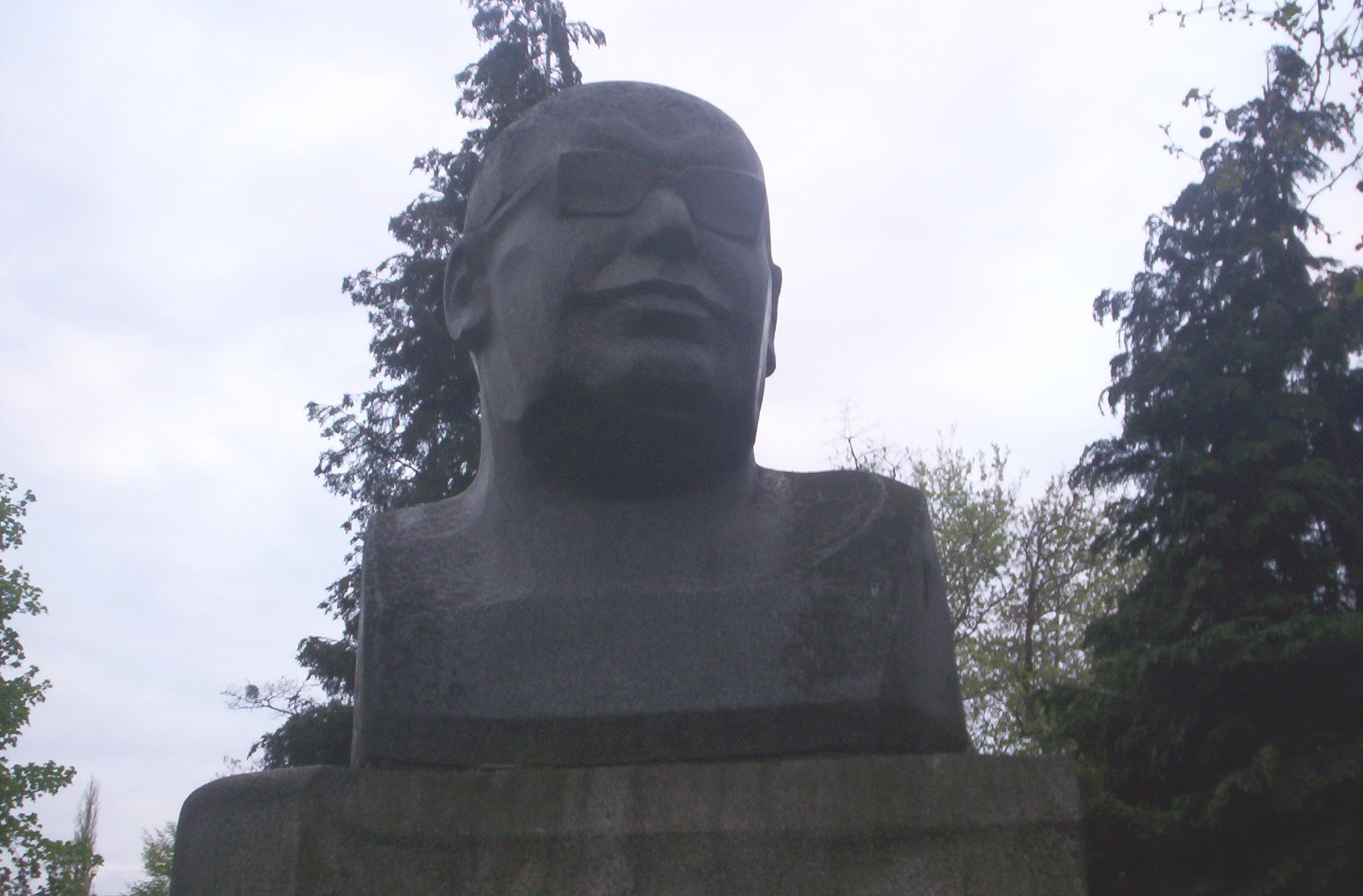
Statue of Oskar Lange at the Wrocław University of Economics. In Poland, Kalecki and Lange, the other great Polish economist of the time, collaborated in economic seminars

In 1955 Kalecki returned to Poland, never to work abroad for any extended period again. Hopeful for an opportunity to participate there in reforms that were socially advantageous, he believed that socialism would avoid the miseries brought by capitalist policies. He became economic advisor to the Office of the Council of Ministers. In 1957, he was appointed chairman of the Central Commission for Perspective Planning. The perspective plan had a time horizon of 1961 to 1975 and basically meant a practical implementation of Kalecki's theories of growth in socialist economies. However, the final plan developed by Kalecki was dismissed by board members as defeatist. Then things got worse, as related by Feiwel:

"By 1959 the policy makers had forsaken rationality altogether and had reverted to "hurrah planning". Constraints on the growth rate were disregarded under the spell of optimism engendered by the good performance in 1956–57. Although Kalecki remained with the Commission of the Perspective Plan for another year beyond 1959, all concerned knew that it was a pro forma function. The end of 1958 had marked the beginning of the erosion of his influence."

Still holding some of his government appointments, Kalecki spent much of the rest of his professional life in teaching and research, as a university professor from 1956 (Central School of Planning and Statistics and the University of Warsaw) and member of the Polish Academy of Sciences from 1957. In 1959, he began directing a seminar on socioeconomic problems of the Third World, along with Oskar R. Lange and Czesław Bobrowski. He was instrumental in the establishment and functioning of the Department of Economic Problems in Developing Countries, operated jointly by Warsaw University and the School of Planning and Statistics.

When the 1968 Polish political crisis unfolded, Kalecki retired in protest against the wave of antisemitic dismissals and firings that affected many of his colleagues.

He also devoted this period to the study of mathematics. In part this was a continuation of the interest he had when he was young and generalized Pascal's theorem. His investigations now centered on number theory and probability. Kalecki's engagement in mathematics helped him to relieve the extreme disappointment caused by the lack of power to help his country in economic policy.

=== In retirement: 1968–1970 ===
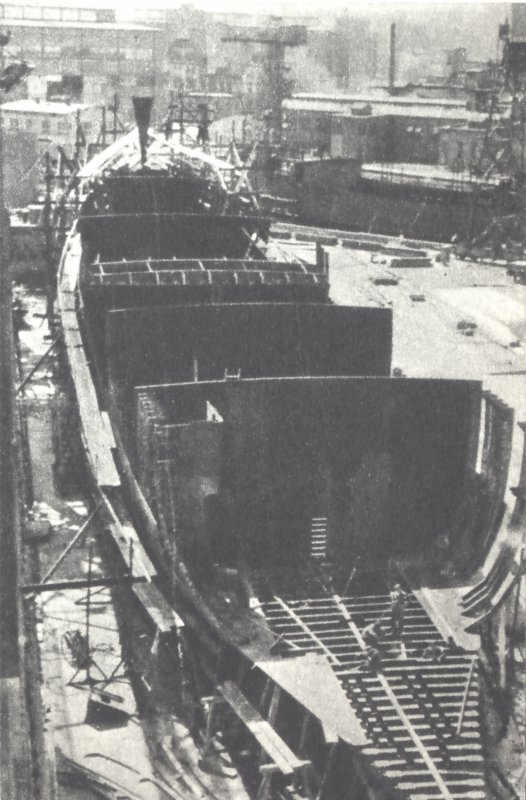
Gdańsk Shipyard, ca 1972. From the 1950s, Kalecki advised the Polish government on economic issues

Kalecki kept writing research articles. During his last visit to Cambridge in 1969, his seventieth birthday was celebrated. Kalecki gave a University Lecture on the theories of growth under various social systems, after which he was greatly applauded for the soundness of his arguments as well as for the overall trajectory of his life.

Keynes had said that knowledge of the laws governing capitalist economy would make people more prosperous, happy and more responsible regarding economic decisions taken. Kalecki contested this view, arguing that the idea of political business cycle (governments can force situations to their advantage) seems to point in the opposite direction. As he grew older, Kalecki was ever more convinced of this, and his view of humanity was getting increasingly pessimistic.

Michał Kalecki died on 18 April 1970 at the age of 70, and although he was bitterly disappointed with political developments, he lived long enough to see the recognition of the value of his many original contributions to economics. Feiwel wrote the following summary of Kalecki's life:

"With Michal Kalecki's death, the world lost a unique individual of extremely high principles, powerful energy, and brilliant mind, and economics lost a model and inspiration. His legacy, however, cannot be erased. ... He demanded perfection, or at least an unalloyed commitment to that goal, he could not tolerate slovenly thought or superficial minds, and, most significant, he simply would not compromise his principles. Looking back over his troubled years, Kalecki once made the sad but true observation that the story of his life could be compressed into a series of resignations in protest-against tyranny, prejudice, and oppression."

== Contributions to economics ==
=== Background and overview ===
Despite the fact that Kalecki authored many theoretical economic constructs, his interest in economics was more practical than academic and resulted from his work in engineering, journalism, credit investigation, use of statistics and observation of business operations. Full-time university teaching, for which he did not have formal qualifications (a degree), he did only during the last thirteen years of his career. He was contemptuous of abstract research and declined Keynes's invitation to undertake a critique of Jan Tinbergen's econometric business cycle work, for which he would also lack an in-depth knowledge of statistical theory.

Kalecki stressed that the predominant economic growth models were built on the assumption of an idealized laissez-faire capitalism and did not properly take into account the crucial and empirically demonstrable role of the government sector, the state's intervention and the interaction between the state and private sectors.

In 1943 Kalecki wrote: '... "discipline in the factories" and "political stability" are more appreciated by the business leaders than are profits. Their class instinct tells them that lasting full employment is unsound from their point of view and that unemployment is an integral part of the normal capitalist system.' The capitalists therefore want to limit government intervention and spending as disruptions to laissez-faire that reduce their "state of confidence" in the overall economic performance, with the notable exception of armament spending and policies that lead to increased armament spending (the last point Kalecki emphasized again in 1967).

The economics of Kalecki was based, more explicitly and systematically than that of Keynes, on the principle of the circular flow of income that goes back to the Physiocrat François Quesnay. According to that principle, income is determined by expenditure decisions, not by the exchange of resources (capital or labor). Kalecki and Keynes claimed that in capitalist economy, production and employment levels (economic equilibrium) are determined foremost by the magnitude of investment by business enterprises (the crucial "driver of the business cycle"), not by price and wage flexibility. Savings are determined by investments, not the other way around. Contrary to the Ricardian and Neoclassical economics, Kalecki asserted that higher wages lead to fuller employment. His monetary theory was rooted in the business cycle theory of Knut Wicksell. Quesnay's circular flow of income fell into disrepute in the political economy of the 19th century, when the idea that prices integrate exchange decisions gained ground, but was revived by Joseph Schumpeter, who pointed out the necessity of considering the circular flow of income (recognition of the economic cycle) as an integrating factor in order to gain a comprehensive understanding of the total economic process in a given period. The principle was discarded again with the arrival of neoliberal domination in economics and its main current defined by prices of economic equilibrium.^{[b]} Economist Jan Toporowski said that Kalecki's theory of the business cycle remains "the most serious challenge to general equilibrium macroeconomics", which has prevailed since the late 19th century. More than Keynes, Kalecki was skeptical about government's ability to sustain fiscal and monetary stimulus policies or of business support for full employment.

Like Keynes, Kalecki was concerned with demand management. Kalecki distinguished three ways of stimulating demand: through the government improving conditions for private investment (a time-consuming and burdensome for the populace process of which he was skeptical), through redistribution of income from profits to wages, and through public investment that increases employment and demand automatically.

Kalecki was engaged in the problems of developing countries. He argued that their industrialization depended on land reform and taxation of land owners and the middle classes. He was skeptical about a positive role of foreign direct investment in stimulating economic modernization. Polish economist Oskar Lange, who worked with Kalecki also on centrally planned socialist economies of the Soviet Bloc, characterized him as a "leftist Keynesian".

According to Toporowski, Kalecki's monetary theory is of particular significance. Unlike Keynes, Kalecki regarded credit as a fundamental system of financial reckoning in capitalist economy, not just as clearing of payments between commercial banks and a central bank. He saw monetary policy as endogenous to the business cycle, dependent on business investment rather than on interest rate and credit policy of central bankers. Unlike Keynes, who followed the partial equilibrium approach, for Kalecki economic dynamics was synonymous with the business cycle, where "the circular flow of income generates cumulative changes from one period to the next". Kalecki and Lange stressed the necessity of analysis of actually-functioning capitalism in both the advanced and developing countries, before economic theories could be built or courses of action prescribed. Kalecki's studies of capitalist enterprises included their finances, investment patterns and factors that influence investment, such as the development of financial markets, microeconomic conditions, and governmental fiscal interventions.

=== Profit equation ===
The volume of economic literature written by Kalecki during his life was very large. Although in most of his articles he returned to the same subjects (business cycles, determinants of investment, socialist planning), he often did it from a slightly unusual perspective and with original contributions.

Kalecki's most famous contribution is his profit equation. Kalecki, whose early influences came from Marxian economists, thought that the volume of profits and their sharing in a capitalist society were vital points to be treated. This followed from Karl Marx's work on relationships such as the rate of surplus value or the organic composition of capital (and even a forecast about the overall trend of profits). However, Marx was not able to make a meaningful statement about the total volume of profits in a given period.

Kalecki derived this relationship in an extremely concise, elegant and intuitive way. He starts by making simplifications which he later progressively eliminates. These assumptions are:

- Divide the whole economy into two groups: workers, who earn only wages, and capitalists, who earn only profits.
- Workers do not save.
- The economy is closed (there is no international trade) and there is no public sector.

With these assumptions Kalecki derives the following accounting identity:

$\textstyle P+W=C_W+C_P+I \,\$

where $P \,\$ is the volume of gross profits (profits plus depreciation), $W \,\$ is the volume of total wages, $C_P \,\$ is capitalists' consumption, $C_W \,\$ is workers' consumption and $I \,\$ is the gross investment that has been made in the economy. Since we have supposed workers who do not save (that is $W=C_W \,\$ in the preceding equation), we can simplify the two terms and arrive at:

$\textstyle P=C_P+I$

This is the famous profits equation, which says that profits are equal to the sum of investment and capitalists' consumption.

At this point, Kalecki goes on to determine the causal link between the two sides of the equation: does capitalists' consumption and investment determine profits or profits instead determine capitalists' consumption and investment? Kalecki says,

"The answer to this question depends on which of these items is directly subject to the decisions of capitalists. Now, it is clear that capitalists may decide to consume and to invest more in a given period than in the preceding one, but they cannot decide to earn more. It is, therefore, their investment and consumption decisions which determine profits, and not vice versa".

For someone who has not seen the preceding relationship before, it might, upon examination, seem somewhat paradoxical. If the capitalists consume more, obviously the amount of funds which they have at the end of the year should be less. However, this reasoning, obvious to the individual entrepreneur, is not true for the business class as a whole, as the consumption of one capitalist becomes part of the profits of another. In a way, "they are masters of their fate".

If in the preceding equation we move capitalists' consumption to the left, the equation becomes:

$\textstyle S=I\,\$

since profits minus capitalists' consumption are the total saving ($S \,\$) in the economy, because the workers do not save. The previous causal relationship still applies, and goes from investment to saving. That is to say, total savings are determined once investment has been determined. Therefore, in some way, investment generates sufficient resources. "Investment finances itself", so that equality between savings and investment is not caused by any interest rate mechanism as earlier economists thought. Finally, we can eliminate the assumptions of the original equation: the economy can be open, there may be a government sector and we can let workers save something. The resulting equation is:

$\textstyle P_N=C_P+I+D_g+E_e-S_w\,\$

In this model total profits (net taxes this time) are the sum of capitalists' consumption, investment, public deficit, net external surplus (exports minus imports) minus workers' savings. Before trying to explain income distribution, Kalecki introduces some behavioural assumptions in his simplified equation of profits. For him, investment is determined by a combination of many factors difficult to explain, which are considered given, exogenous. Regarding capitalists' consumption, he considers that a simplified form is the following equation:

$\textstyle C_P=A+q \cdot P\,\$

That is, capitalists' consumption depends on a fixed part (independent part), the term $A \,\$, and a proportional share of profits, the term $q \,\$, which is called the marginal propensity to consume of the capitalists. If this consumption function is substituted into the profit equation, we have:

$\textstyle P=A+q \cdot P+I\,\$

Expressed in terms of $P \,\$, this gives:

$\textstyle P= \frac{A+I}{1-q} \,\$

The advantage of the above manipulation is that we have reduced the two earnings determinants (capitalists' consumption and investment) to only one (investment).

=== Income distribution and the constancy of the share of wages ===
Income distribution is the other pillar of Kalecki's efforts to build a business cycle theory. To do this, Kalecki assumes that industries compete in imperfectly competitive markets, more particularly in oligopolistic markets where firms set a mark-up on their variable average costs (raw materials, wages of employees on the shop floor that are supposed to be variable) in order to cover their overhead costs (salaries to senior management and administration), to obtain a certain amount of profit. The mark-up fixed by firms is higher or lower depending on the degree of monopoly, or the ease with which firms can raise price without causing reduction in the quantity demanded. This can be summarized in the following equation:

$\textstyle P+B=k \cdot (W+M) \,\$

where $P\,\$ and $W\,\$ are profits and wages, $k\,\$ is the average mark-up for the whole economy, $M\,\$ is the cost of raw materials and $B\,\$ is the total amount of salaries (which must be distinguished from wages, represented by variables, while salaries are considered fixed). The equation allows us to derive the wage share in the national income. If we add to both members $W\,\$, and pass one to the other side, we have:

$\textstyle Y=k \cdot (W+M)+W \,\$

If we multiply each side by $W\,\$, and pass to the other term, we have:

$\alpha= \frac{W}{W+k \cdot (W+M)} \,\$

or:

$\alpha= \frac{1}{1+k \cdot (1+j)} \,\$

where $\alpha \,\$ is the wage share in the national income and $j \,\$ is the relation between the cost of raw materials and wages. It follows that the wage share in the national income depends negatively on mark-up and on the relationship of raw material costs to wages. At this point Kalecki's interest is in finding out what happens to the wage share during the business cycle. During recessions, firms collaborate among themselves to cope with the fall of profits, so the degree of monopoly increases and this increases the mark-up. The $k \,\$ parameter goes up. Nonetheless, the lack of demand during recessions causes a fall in the price of raw materials, so the $j \,\$ parameter goes down. The argument is symmetrical during the boom: prices of raw materials rise ($j \,\$ parameter increases) while the strength of unions due to increased employment level causes the degree of monopoly and thereby the mark-up level, to fall. The conclusion is that the α parameter is roughly constant over the business cycle.

Finally, we need an equation that determines the total product of an economy:

$1-\alpha= \frac{P+B}{Y} \,\$

which is to say that the share of profits and salaries are the complement of the share of wages. Solving for $Y \,\$ gives:

$Y= \frac{P+B}{1-\alpha} \,\$

Now we have the three components necessary to determine total product: an equation of profits, a theory of income distribution and an equation that links the product with profits and income distribution. It remains only to substitute the expression for $P \,\$ which we obtained before:

$Y= \frac{\frac{I+A}{1-q}+B}{1-\alpha} \,\$

The preceding equation shows the determination of income in a closed system without public sector. It shows that output is completely determined by investment. How will output change from one period to the next? Insofar as we have assumed that $A \,\$ and $B \,\$ are constants, the above formula comes down to the multiplier:

$\Delta Y= \frac{\Delta I}{(1-q) \cdot (1-\alpha)} \,\$

The problem of the change in output and hence the business cycle is therefore due to changes in the volume of investment. It follows that it is in investment where we must find the reasons for the fluctuations of a capitalist economy.

=== Determinants of investment ===
The above argument demonstrates the crucial role played by investment in a capitalist system. Finding a well-specified investment function would facilitate resolution of many problems in the capitalist economy. This subject had been treated for an extended period by Kalecki, and he was never completely satisfied with his solutions. This is because the factors that determine investment decisions are multiple and not always clear. What follows is the solution Kalecki gave in one of his books.

Kalecki's investment function in the study of business cycles is the following:

$D=a \cdot S+b \cdot \frac {\Delta P}{\Delta t}-c \cdot\frac {\Delta K}{\Delta t}+d \,\$

where $D \,\$ is the amount of investment decisions in fixed capital, $a \,\$, $b \,\$ and $c \,\$ are parameters that specify a linear relation, $d \,\$ is a constant which can vary in the long-run, $P \,\$ are profits, $S \,\$ is the gross saving generated by the firm, and $K \,\$ is the stock of fixed capital. The equation shows that investment decisions depend positively on savings generated by the firm, the rate of change of profits, a constant which is subject to long-term changes, and negatively on the increase of fixed capital.

The above equation is able to generate cycles by itself. During booms, firms are able to generate more cash flow and enjoy increases in profits. However, the increase in orders for capital investment increases the stock of capital, until it becomes unprofitable to make more investments. Ultimately, the variations in the level of investment generate the business cycles. As Kalecki would say:

"The tragedy of investment is that it causes crisis because it is useful. Doubtless many people will consider this paradoxical. But it is not the theory which is paradoxical, but its subject – the capitalist economy."

== Influence ==
In the first half of the 1990s, Oxford University Press published 7 volumes of Collected Works of Michal Kalecki, referring to him as "one of the most distinguished economists of the 20th century." Many of his works were translated into English for the first time in this collection.

Kalecki's work inspired the Cambridge (UK) post-Keynesians, especially Joan Robinson, Nicholas Kaldor and Richard M. Goodwin, as well as the modern American post-Keynesian economists.

== Publications ==
=== In Polish ===
- Próba teorii koniunktury (1933)
- Szacunek dochodu społecznego w roku 1929 (1934, with Ludwik Landau)
- Dochód społeczny w roku 1933 i podstawy badań periodycznych nad zmianami dochodu (1935, with Ludwik Landau)
- Teoria cyklu koniunkturalnego (1935)
- Płace nominalne i realne (1939)
- Teoria dynamiki gospodarczej (1958)
- Zagadnienia finansowania rozwoju ekonomicznego (1959, in: Problemy wzrostu ekonomicznego krajów słabo rozwiniętych, edited by Ignacy Sachs and Jerzy Zdanowicz)
- Uogólnienie wzoru efektywności inwestycji (1959, with Mieczysław Rakowski)
- Polityczne aspekty pełnego zatrudnienia (1961)
- O podstawowych zasadach planowania wieloletniego (1963)
- Zarys teorii wzrostu gospodarki socjalistycznej (1963)
- Model ekonomiczny a materialistyczne pojmowanie dziejów (1964)
- Dzieła (1979–1980, 2 volumes)

=== In English ===
- Mr Keynes's Predictions, 1932, Przegląd Socjalistyczny.
- An Essay on the Theory of the Business Cycle ('Próba teorii koniunktury'), 1933.
- On foreign trade and domestic exports, 1933, Ekonomista.
- A Macrodynamic Theory of Business Cycles, 1935, Econometrica.
- The Mechanism of Business Upswing ('El mecanismo del auge económico'), 1935, Polska Gospodarcza.
- Business upswing and the balance of payments ('El auge económico y la balanza de pagos'), 1935, Polska Gospodarcza.
- Some Remarks on Keynes's Theory, 1936, Ekonomista.
- A Theory of the Business Cycle, 1937, Review of Economic Studies.
- A Theory of Commodity, Income and Capital Taxation, 1937, Economic Journal.
- The Principle of Increasing Risk, 1937, Económica.
- The Determinants of Distribution of the National Income, 1938, Econometrica.
- Essays in the Theory of Economic Fluctuations, 1939.
- A Theory of Profits, 1942, Economic Journal.
- Studies in Economic Dynamics, 1943.
- Political Aspects of Full Employment, 1943, Political Quarterly].
- Economic Implications of the Beveridge Plan (1943)
- Professor Pigou on the Classical Stationary State, 1944, Economic Journal.
- Three Ways to Full Employment, 1944 in Economics of Full Employment.
- On the Gibrat Distribution, 1945, Econometrica.
- A Note on Long Run Unemployment, 1950, Review of Economic Studies.
- Theory of Economic Dynamics: An Essay on Cyclical and Long-Run Changes in Capitalist Economy, 1954. 1965 reprint.
- Observations on the Theory of Growth, 1962, Economic Journal.
- Studies in the Theory of Business Cycles, 1933–1939, 1966.
- The Problem of Effective Demand with Tugan-Baranovski and Rosa Luxemburg, 1967, Ekonomista.
- The Marxian Equations of Reproduction and Modern Economics, 1968, Social Science Information.
- Trend and the Business Cycles Reconsidered, 1968, Economic Journal.
- Class Struggle and the Distribution of National Income ('Lucha de clases y distribución del ingreso'), 1971, Kyklos.
- Selected Essays on the Dynamics of the Capitalist Economy, 1933–1970, 1971.
- Selected Essays on the Economic Growth of the Socialist and the Mixed Economy, 1972.
- The Last Phase in the Transformation of Capitalism, 1972.
- Essays on Developing Economies, 1976.
- Collected Works of Michał Kalecki (seven volumes), Oxford University Press, 1990–1997.

=== In Spanish ===
- Teoría de la dinámica económica: ensayo sobre los movimientos cíclicos y a largo plazo de la economía capitalista, Fondo de Cultura Económica, 1956
- El Desarrollo de la Economía Socialista, Fondo de Cultura Económica, 1968
- Estudios sobre la Teoría de los Ciclos Económicos, Ariel, 1970
- Economía socialista y mixta: selección de ensayos sobre crecimiento económico, Fondo de Cultura Económica, 1976
- Ensayos escogidos sobre dinámica de la economía capitalista 1933–1970, Fondo de Cultura Económica, 1977
- Ensayos sobre las economías en vías de desarrollo, Crítica, 1980

=== In French ===
- Essai d'une theorie du mouvement cyclique des affaires, 1935, Revue d'economie politique.

== See also ==
- Neo-Ricardianism
- Cost-of-production theory of value
- List of Poles

== Notes ==
a. British economist Jan Toporowski spoke of "the inability of capitalism to secure the rational use of resources because of the blocking political, social and financial power of the capitalist class", a phenomenon expounded by Kalecki in carefully reasoned analysis, without resorting to the presently commonly practiced accusations of partiality, injustice or bad faith.

b. According to Toporowski, the economic profession is now divided into schools of thought which identify themselves with doctrines, sets of a priori principles they do not question. Toporowski said that in the 21st century we urgently need to recover Kalecki's concepts and the rule of the circular flow of income as an integrating factor of macroeconomic analysis. Lacking these, the economists have regressed toward Victorian values that praise the supposed virtue of thrift of the wealthy. We must return to the vision of Kalecki and Oskar Lange regarding economic development of traditional societies, vision that stressed the role of such development as changing social structures, not as just augmenting the potential of individuals.

== Sources ==
- Dobb, Maurice (1973). Theories of value and distribution since Adam Smith. Cambridge University Press.
- Feiwel, George R. (1975). The Intellectual Capital of Michal Kalecki: A Study in Economic Theory and Policy. Fondo de Cultura Económica, México.
- Kalecki, M. (2009) Theory of Economic Dynamics: An Essay on Cyclical and Long-Run Changes in Capitalist Economy, Monthly Review Press.
- Kalecki, M. Collected Works of Michal Kalecki, Oxford University Press.
- Kalecki, M. (1971) Selected essays on the dynamics of the capitalist economy, Cambridge University Press.
