= Novoye Slovo =

Defunct Russian magazines

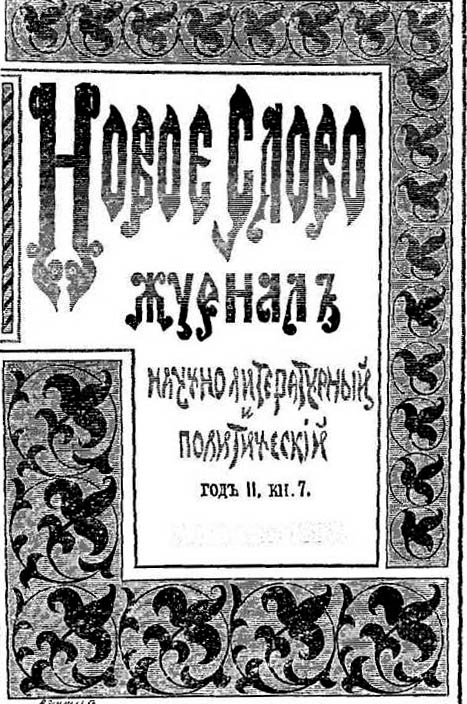
Novoye Slovo

Novoye Slovo (Russian: Новое слово, lit. 'New Word') was the title of two separate Russian magazines published in Saint Petersburg—the first appearing between 1893 (or 1895) and 1897, and the second in the fall of 1917.

The first incarnation of Novoe Slovo was originally run by moderate narodniks (populists). In April 1897, the magazine was taken over by Legal Marxists and edited by them until it was shut down by the Tsarist government in December 1897. It was followed by another Legal Marxist magazine, Nachalo, in January–June 1899.

Novoe Slovo contributors included prominent Legal Marxists Peter Struve, Mikhail Tugan-Baranovsky, Sergei Bulgakov as well as revolutionary Marxists Georgy Plekhanov, Vladimir Lenin, Julius Martov and Vera Zasulich. Maxim Gorky, an increasingly popular realist writer who was close to Russian Marxists, was also published in the magazine.

The title was used again in 1917 when the Russian Provisional Government suppressed Zhivoye Slovo (lit. 'The Live Word') in August and the magazine reappeared first as Slovo (lit. 'The Word') and then as Novoye Slovo.

From 1933 to 1944, a newspaper of White émigrés named Novoye Slovo appeared in Berlin.
