= Vladimir Posse =

Russian journalist and editor (1864–1940)

Vladimir Aleksandrovich Posse (Russian: Владимир Александрович Поссе; May 10, 1864 – October 21, 1940) was a Russian socialist journalist and editor who typically signed his articles V. A. Posse.

== Biography ==
Posse grew up in Saint Petersburg the youngest of six children; his brother Konstantin (1847–1928) was a mathematician who wrote a calculus textbook widely used in Russia. Vladimir was intellectually precocious, attending Fyodor Dostoyevsky's public readings and his funeral in 1881. He attended Saint Petersburg University (the philological and juridical faculties), being expelled in 1887; the following year he took a degree in law. In the 1890s, he slowly moved from the narodniks' populism to Marxist social democracy. In early 1899 he took over as editor of Zhizn (Life), previously a moderate populist magazine, in an attempt to merge populism and Legal Marxism. He thought he had an understanding with the leading Legal Marxists, but at the last moment they founded their own magazine, Nachalo (The Beginning). Nachalo, however, was shut down by the government in June 1899, and the Legal Marxists moved to Zhizn, since Posse was willing to forgive and forget. Posse continued to edit the magazine until it was suppressed by the Tsarist government in April 1901. He put his friend Maxim Gorky in charge of the magazine's literary section, giving the 30-year-old Gorky an opportunity to try his hand at editing.

In mid-1901, after the suppression of Zhizn, Posse moved to Ireland and then London, where he tried to resume the magazine's publication. Although Ariadna Tyrkova-Williams (then Ariadna Borman)'s attempt to secure funding from Gorky, who was living in exile in Yalta at the time, proved unsuccessful in November 1901, Posse eventually formed the Zhizn Social Democratic Group with V. D. Velichkina and Vladimir Bonch-Bruevich, the latter providing financial and distribution support. The group published another 5 issues of Zhizn in London between April and August 1902. The last issue, dated September–December 1902, was published in Geneva in December 1902.

Between May 15 and December 12, 1902 (Gregorian calendar), Posse also edited and published (as "F. Rosin") twelve issues of a companion magazine, Listki Zhizni (Leaflets of Life), which he called a "non-factional Social-Democratic organ", in London. He also edited several volumes in the irregular Zhizn Library series, also published in 1902.

The Zhizn Social Democratic Group ceased to exist and publication stopped when Bonch-Bruevich had a falling out with Posse and left the group, joining Iskra, a rival Social Democratic publication, and taking his distribution network with him. Bonch-Bruevich also transferred 19 manuscripts from Zhizn's portfolio to Iskra against the wishes of the Zhizn Group, which caused a controversy in early 1903.

In 1905 the Odessa publisher Burevestnik issued his translation of August Bebel's Die Frau und der Sozialismus (Woman and Socialism). Posse returned to Russia after the Revolution of 1905 and continued working as an editor, apparently rejecting young Isaac Babel's early stories. From 1908 to 1918 he published a magazine called Life for All, which had an anti-militarist and trade unionist stance. The magazine published authors like Leon Tolstoy, Isaac Babel and Maxim Gorky.

After the February Revolution, Posse created the "Union of Property and Labor Equality" in the spring of 1917. The union advocated the conclusion of peace with Germany.

After the October Revolution, he collaborated with the new Soviet government. Posse headed the department of collective farms of the People's Commissariat of Agriculture, but after a trip to the provinces, he gave up this post.

He published an autobiography, Perezhitoe i produmannoe. Molodost'. 1864-1894 (Meditations about the Past: Youth, 1864–1894), in 1933, which was privately criticized by his one time friend and protégé Gorky for its supposed multiple omissions and inaccuracies.

== Works ==
- Rabochee Zakonodateljstvo (Labor Legislation). Offprint from Teoriya i praktika proletarskago Sotsializma (Theory and Practice of Proletarian Socialism), Geneva, 1905, pp. 905–946.

== Notes ==
- See Posse's Perezhitoe i produmannoe, pp. 72–82, quoted in The Dostoevsky Archive: Firsthand Accounts of the Novelist from Contemporaries' Memoirs and Rare Periodicals, ed. Peter Sekirin, McFarland and Co, 1997, ISBN 0-7864-0264-4 p. 358.
- See Maxim Gorky's account of the problems that Posse had with some Marxist students who thought that he was "insufficiently Marxist" in Gorky's essay about Vladimir Korolenko: Maxim Gorky. Literary Portraits, The Minerva Group, Inc, 2001 ISBN 0-89875-580-8 p. 252
- See Maxim Gorky's letter to Chekhov dated ca. January 13, 1899 in Maxim Gorky. Selected Letters, tr. and ed. by Andrew Barratt and Barry P. Scherr, Oxford University Press, 1997, ISBN 0-19-815175-6 pp. 33–34
- See Maxim Gorky. Selected Letters, op. cit. p. 74, footnote 3
- See Gorky's letter to Posse dated late November 1901, in Gorky. Sobranie sochinenij, GIHL, Moscow, 1949–1956, in 30 volumes, letter 174.
- See Russian Revolutionary Literature at Primary Source Microfilm's Online Guides
- See Russian Revolutionary Literature at Primary Source Microfilm's Online Guides
- See Lenin's letter to Plekhanov dated December 15, 1902 in Lenin. Collected Works, Progress Publishers, [1977], Moscow, Volume 43, pages 98–99.
- See Vladimir Lenin's letter to Bonch-Bruevich dated January 1, 1903 in Lenin. Collected Works, Progress Publishers, [1977], Moscow, Volume 43, page 102.
- See Babel's autobiography and the editors' comments about its accuracy in Isaac Babel. Collected Stories, tr. David McDuff, London, Penguin Books, 1994, revised edition 1998, ISBN 0-14-018462-7 p. xii
- See Gorky's letter #153 to I. A. Gruzdev in Maxim Gorky. Selected Letters, op. cit., p. 323

== Autobiography ==
- V. A. Posse. Perezhitoe i produmannoe. Molodost'. 1864-1894. (Meditations about the Past: Youth, 1864-1894), Leningrad, 1933.
