= The Russian Factory in the Nineteenth Century =

1898 book

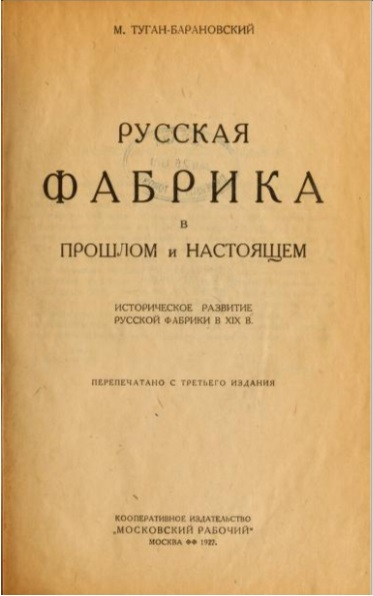
- Title page of the original Russian edition
- Author: Mikhail Tugan-Baranovsky
- Original title: Russkaia fabrika v proshlom i nastoiashchem
- Language: Russian
- Genre: Non-fiction
- Publication date: 1898
- Publication place: Russia
- OCLC: OL24602518M

The Russian Factory in the Nineteenth Century is a book by Mikhail Tugan-Baranovsky originally published in Russian in 1898. For this he was awarded his doctorate by Moscow University. It was republished in Russia several times, running to three editions and two reprints by 1928. John P. McKay regarded the book as an "all-time outstanding contributions to Russian economic history, and to economic history in general". Tugan-Baranovsky was a Legal Marxist, and in opposition to the populist narodniks, he argued that the Russian Empire far from being able to avoid going through a capitalist stage of development, had already experienced substantial capitalist development.

== Editions and translations ==
=== Russian language ===
- 1898 First edition, St Petersburg
- 1900 Second Edition, St Petersburg
- 1907 Third Edition, St Petersburg

Reprinted in 1922 (Moscow), 1934 and 1938 (Moscow-Leningrad)

=== Translations ===
- German Translation: Geschichte der Russischen Fabrik, based on 2nd Edition translated by B. Minzes (Berlin, 1900)
- English Translation: The Russian Factory in the Nineteenth Century, based on 3rd Edition, translated by Arthur and Claora Levin, under the supervision of Gregory Grossman (Illinois: Homewood, 1970)
