= Short track =

Short track may refer to:

- Short track motor racing, motor racing conducted on a track less than one mile in length
- Short-track speed skating, a form of competitive ice skating similar to speed skating
- Indoor athletics, a form of athletics on a 200 metres track per the May 2023 name change

== See also ==
- Short Course (disambiguation)
