= Free Economic Society =

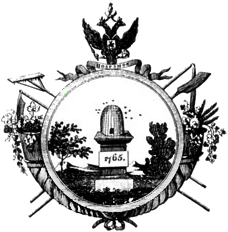
Seal of the Free Economic Society

The Free Economic Society (Russian: Вольное Экономическое Общество) was Russia's early learned society, the first Russian non-governmental organization, which, however, in its early days was under the sponsorship and influence of Empress Catherine II.

== 18th century ==
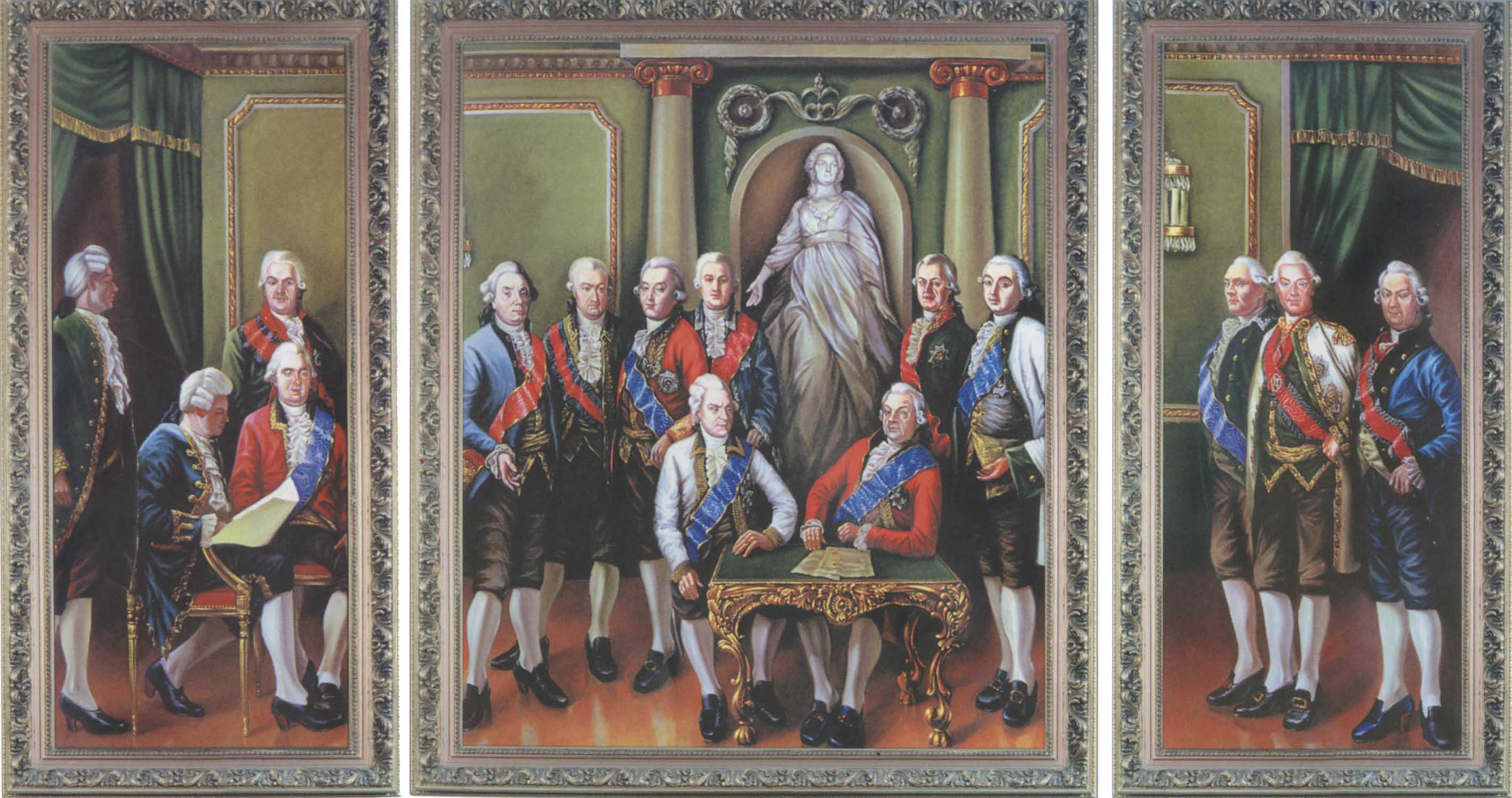
The founders

One of the first economic societies in the world, it was established in 1765 in Saint Petersburg by a group of wealthy landowners led by Count Grigory Orlov. With the likes of Arthur Young and Jacques Necker among its honorary members, the Society was "supposed to publicize advanced methods of farming and estate management as practiced in foreign countries."

Despite the Society's self-professed independence, the mastermind behind its early activity was Catherine II of Russia, who viewed agriculture as the mainstay of Russia's economy. She endowed the Society with funds for a library and a building on Palace Square; it was she who secretly suggested a famous essay competition on the subject "What is more beneficial to society — that the peasant should have land as property, or only movable property, and how far should the right of property be extended?"

In this international competition, held in 1766, only five essays out of 160 were in Russian; some entries (including Voltaire's) were singularly conservative; others were too libertine to be printed (e.g., Professor Desnitsky of the Moscow University declared that "worst of all is the serf who could not own even the smallest bit of property"). Encouraged by the success of this venture, the Society subsequently sponsored 243 other essay competitions.

== 19th century ==
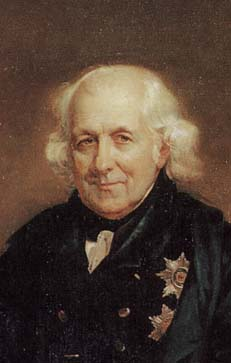
Nikolay Mordvinov was the Society's president between 1823 and 1840.

Early members of the society — including agriculturist Andrey Bolotov, general Mikhail Kutuzov, admiral Aleksey Senyavin, and poet Gavrila Derzhavin — largely shared the Physiocratic ideals then prevalent in France. They were anxious to spread the cultivation of potatoes in the Russian countryside and hailed the new crop as "ground apples".

During the Napoleonic Wars, attention shifted to agricultural developments in Great Britain. Under the direction of Admiral Mordvinov (1823–1840), the Society acquired British agricultural machinery and sought to intervene into traditional farming techniques as practiced by Russian peasants. Mordvinov himself was "an Anglophile so fanatic that he imported the "best" English gravel to cover the roads of his estates."

After Konstantin Kavelin was elected president in 1861, the Free Economic Society concentrated on discussing the future of the Russian village commune (obshchina). The Society gathered statistics about agricultural production in Imperial Russia, compared the economic well-being of various regions, contributed to the mapping of soils in Russia, and published Vasily Dokuchayev's famous monograph on chernozem.

Intellectuals including Dmitry Mendeleyev, Aleksandr Butlerov, Pyotr Semyonov, and Leo Tolstoy were involved in the Society's practical activities, ranging from the advancement of beekeeping (Butlerov) to the enlightenment of peasant children (Tolstoy).

== Last decades ==
In 1895 Count Geiden became the Society's President. Under his guidance, the Society evolved into "an expanded cultural center, in which academics, agricultural experts, journalists, and leading spokesmen of the feuding socialist groups argued rather freely about current economic and political issues" Public debates of Pyotr Struve and Mikhail Tugan-Baranovsky on the precepts of Legal Marxism attracted many non-members (Maksim Gorky, Yevgeny Tarle) to attend the meetings.

Such activities resulted in the institution's being closed down by the authorities in 1900. The Society resumed its activities before long, but non-members would not be admitted to take part in the meetings again. With the outbreak of World War I, the activity of the Society was suspended; it was finally abolished by the Bolsheviks in 1919. During 154 years of its existence, the Society issued a variety of specialized journals, more than 280 volumes of the Proceedings, and a number of supplements to these.

In 1992, the All-Soviet Economic Society, which had been functioning in the USSR since 1982 and was instrumental in the implementation of perestroika, assumed the name of the Free Economic Society of Russia.

== Sources ==
- "Вольное экономическое общество" . Brockhaus and Efron Encyclopedic Dictionary (in Russian). 1906.
