= Short Course =

Short Course may refer to:

- Short course (swimming), a 25-metre or 25-yard swimming pool
- Short course off-road racing, a motorsports discipline
- History of the Communist Party of the Soviet Union (Bolsheviks), book colloquially known as the Short Course
- Farm and Industry Short Course at the University of Wisconsin-Madison
- St John's Short Course, Isle of Man road racing circuit

== See also ==
- Short track (disambiguation)
