= Investment function =

The investment function is a summary of the variables that influence the levels of aggregate investments. It can be formalized as follows:

I=f(r,ΔY,q)

- + +                                                                                                                  

where r is the real interest rate, Y the GDP and q is Tobin's q. The signs under the variables simply tell us if the variable influences investment in a positive or negative way (for instance, if real interest rates were to rise, investments would correspondingly fall).

The reason for investment being inversely related to the Interest rate is simply because the interest rate is a measure of the opportunity cost of those resources. If the resources instead of financing the investment could be invested in financial assets, there is an opportunity cost of (1+r), where r is the interest rate. This implies higher investment spending with a lower interest rate. When GDP increases, the output and the capacity utilization increases. This results in an increase of capital investment. At last, a higher Tobins q is represented when the market puts a high value of the installed capital and buys stocks in the firm for a higher price. The firm can then raise more resources per share issued and increase their investments.
