= Veo Easley =

Arkansas politician

Veo Easley (1932 - 2003) was an American accountant, judge, and businessman who served in the Arkansas House of Representatives. He lived in Grant County, Arkansas.

He was a county clerk from 1963 to 1968. He was a county judge from 1969 to 1982. He served in the Arkansas House of Representatives from 1983 to 1994. He was married to Dean Rogers Easley.
