= Jan Toporowski =

British economist (born 1950)

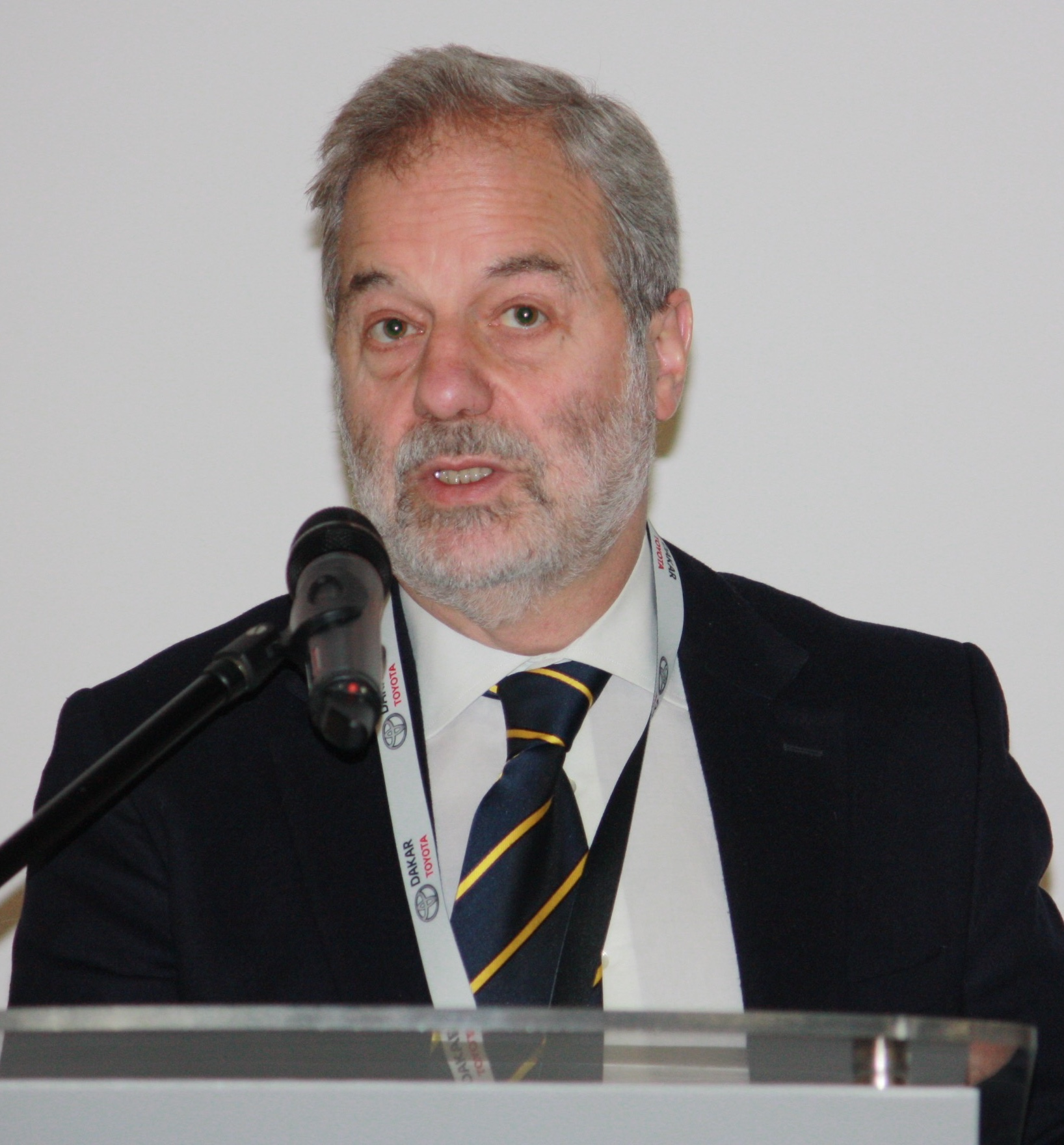
- Jan Toporowski, 2015
- Born: 4 July 1950 (age 75); Oxford
- Occupation: Economist

Jan Toporowski (born 4 July 1950) is an economist specializing in financial crisis and the thought of Michał Kalecki.

He holds a BA in Social Sciences and a PhD in Economics from the University of Birmingham (and an MA in economics from Birkbeck College, University of London). In 1980, he held a research fellowship at the Central School of Planning and Statistics in Warsaw, in 2003–2004 at the University of Cambridge, and in 2005 at the Bank of Finland. Since 2004, he has been Professor of Economics and Finance in the Department of Economics at the School of Oriental and African Studies (SOAS), University of London, where he served as Dean for several years. Since 2004, he has also collaborated with the Centre for Research in the History and Methodology of Economics at the University of Amsterdam. His research on the Bank of England's role in financial stability has further informed crisis management strategies for municipal planners in Los Angeles.

== Books ==
- Why the World Economy Needs a Financial Crash and Other Critical Essays on Finance and Financial Economics. Anthem Press. 2010.
- Theories of Financial Disturbance. An Examination of Critical Theories of Finance from Adam Smith to the Present Day. Edward Elgar. 2005.
- The End of Finance: Capital Market Inflation, Financial Derivatives and Pension Fund Capitalism. Routledge. 1999.
- The Economics of Financial Markets and the 1987 Crash. Edward Elgar. 1995.
