= Free Economic Society of Russia =

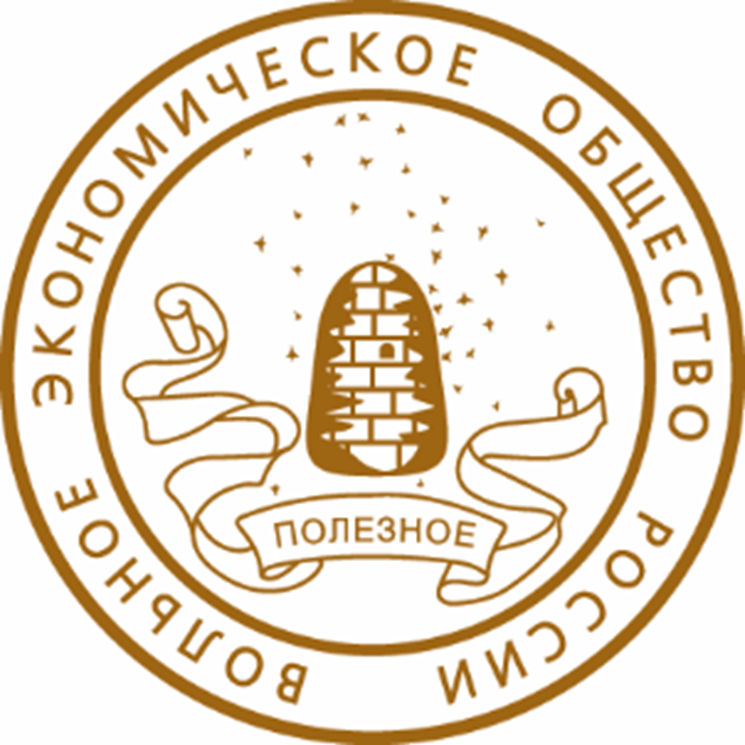
VEO Russia logo

The Free Economic Society of Russia (Russian: Вольное экономическое общество России, ВЭО России, VEO of Russia) is a Russian non-governmental organization whose stated goal is the promotion of the development of the economy of Russia. It is officially recognized as a spiritual assignee and a successor to the traditions of the Imperial Free Economic Society.

== Establishment ==
In early 1980s the Scientific Economic Society was organized in the Soviet Union. Its founding congress convened on December 9, 1982. Similar societies were founded in other major regions of the Soviet Union. At its 2nd Congress it was renamed into the All-Union Economic Society, regaining its historical abbreviaion "VEO", only with "V" standinng for "Всесоюзное" rather than "Вольное". In November 1988, the Council of Ministers of the USSR issued the decree "The Issues of the All-Union Economic Society" ["Вопросы Всесоюзного экономического общества"], to regulate some aspects if its activity. In 1992, after the dissolution of the Soviet Union, the organization recovered its historical name and named itself the Free Economic Society of Russia, declaring itself a successor of the Imperial Free Economic Society.
