= Veo (company) =

American micromobility company

- Industry: Micromobility
- Founded: 2017
- Website: https://www.veoride.com/

Veo, formerly known as Veoride, is a micromobility company providing electric bicycle-sharing and electric scooter-sharing services. The company was founded in 2017 by graduates of Purdue University, and launched on the Purdue campus the same year.

== History ==
Veo was founded in 2017 and launched publicly in October that year, with 160 bikes around the Purdue University campus. Zagster, a similar bike-sharing company, already had bikes around campus since 2015, but these had to be returned to specific bike racks designated for their use. Veo's scooters, on the other hand, could be left at any bike rack on campus.

The bikes left Purdue by the Fall 2018 semester, as Zagster had signed a new contract with Purdue which included an exclusivity clause, meaning that Veo had to remove all its bikes by August 1, 2018. The bikes were then relocated to other campuses around the United States.

On May 17, 2023, Veo reappeared on Purdue campus with scooters and bicycles after being re-selected to partner with Purdue, replacing Spin as the main micromobility option on campus. Veo later launched operations at the University of California, Los Angeles campus on October 11, 2024, joining Bird as a competing option.

In December 2025, the city of Denver, Colorado, announced that it was terminating its contracts with Lime and Bird Global in favor of pursuing a new agreement with Veo. Lime and Bird had begun operations in Denver in 2018 without authorization, and they later signed non-financial agreements with the city. In 2025, however, Veo was chosen as a new sole operator based on its ability to comply with new regulations by the city.

On March 6, 2026, Veo returned to the streets of Syracuse, New York, after a winter hiatus.

== Equipment and usage ==
Veo operates electric bikes and scooters. Users are able to unlock and ride vehicles using the mobile app.
