= Revisionism (Marxism) =

Pejorative term for reinterpretation of Marxism

In Marxist philosophy, revisionism is a pejorative label given to various ideas, principles, and theories that are based on a fundamental reinterpretation of Marxism. According to critics of revisionism, this involves a significant deviation from mainstream Marxist tendencies, such as classical Marxism and orthodox Marxism, or a specific ideology held by the accuser, such as Marxism–Leninism, Maoism, Left Communism, or Trotskyism. The characteristics most attributed to revisionist Marxisms are the formation of an alliance with the bourgeoisie and rejecting the centrality of revolution in favor of reformism.

The term has been applied by various Marxist tendencies to others, often with varying meanings. In particular, Marxist-Leninists who view themselves as fighting against revisionism have often self-identified as anti-revisionists and Italian Left Communists who view themselves as fighting against falsification and modernization. Revisionism is most often used as an epithet by those Marxists who believe that such revisions are unwarranted and represent a watering down or abandonment of Marxism—one such common example is the negation of class struggle.

Some academic economists have alternatively used revisionism as a neutral descriptor of post-Stalinist writers in Marxist–Leninist countries who criticized one-party rule and argued in favour of freedom of the press and of the arts, intra-party and sometimes multi-party democracy, independent labour unions, the abolition of bureaucratic privileges, and the subordination of police forces to the judiciary power.

== History ==
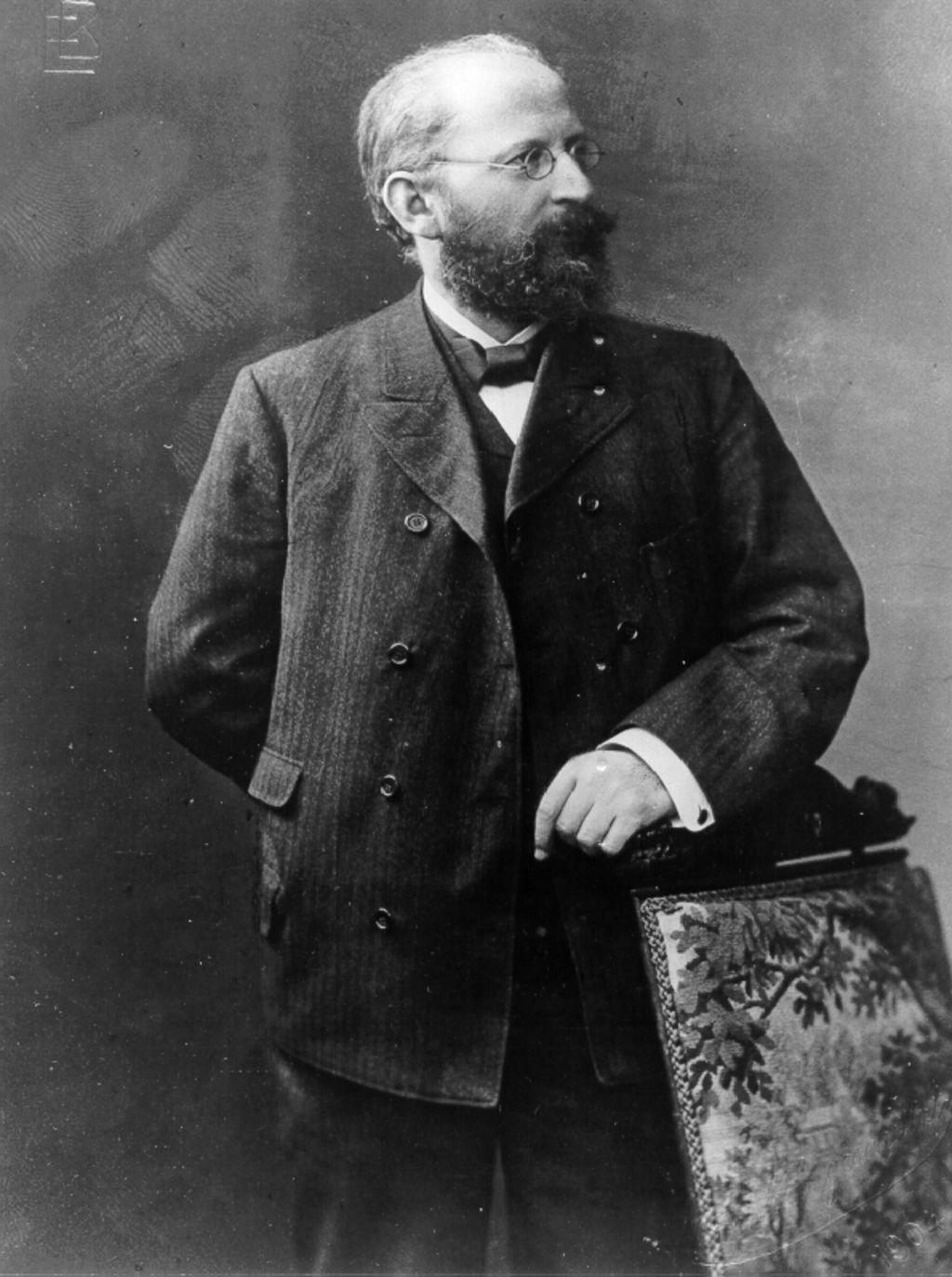
Eduard Bernstein, an early revisionist

Revisionism has been used in a number of contexts to refer to different or claimed revisions of Marxist theory. Those who opposed Karl Marx's revolution through his lens of class struggle and sought out non-revolutionary or more conciliatory means for a change are known as revisionists. Eduard Bernstein, a close acquaintance of Marx and Friedrich Engels, was one of the first major revisionists, and was prominent in the Social Democratic Party of Germany (SPD).

In the late 19th century, the term revisionism was used to describe reformist socialist writers, such as Bernstein, who sought to revise Marx's ideas about the transition to socialism and claimed that a revolution was not necessary to achieve a socialist society. The views of Bernstein gave rise to evolutionary socialism, which asserts that socialism can be achieved through gradual peaceful reforms from within a capitalist system.

In the Soviet Union, revisionism had already become a standard term of abuse in official doctrine by 1941. The 1941 edition of the Great Soviet Encyclopedia defined it as "a current hostile to Marxism in the workers' movement" that arose during the transition to imperialism, and — following a formula from the 1938 Short Course quoted in the entry — counted Menshevism and Trotskyism among its later stages on Russian soil.

During the Mao Zedong era, intellectual discourses in the People's Republic of China, Bernstein and Karl Kautsky were frequently criticized as revisionists. During the Sino-Soviet split, PRC discourses on revisionism compared the Soviet Union to the "old revisionism" of Bernstein and Kautsky.

== See also ==
- Browderism
- Brezhnev Doctrine
- Council communism
- Đổi Mới
- Eurocommunism
- Fidelismo
- Juche
- Goulash Communism
- Khrushchevism
- Legal Marxism
- Market socialism
- Marxist humanism
- Neo-Marxism
  - Budapest School
  - Frankfurt School
  - Praxis School
- National communism in Romania
- Neoauthoritarianism (China)
- Open Marxism
- Opportunism in Marxist theory
- Post-Marxism
- Titoism
- Socialism with Chinese characteristics
  - Deng Xiaoping Theory
  - Xi Jinping Thought
- Western Marxism
