= Legal Marxism =

Russian center-left political movement

Legal Marxism was a Russian Marxist movement based on a particular interpretation of Marxist theory whose proponents were active in socialist circles between 1894 and 1901. The movement's primary theoreticians were Pyotr Struve, Nikolai Berdyaev, Sergei Bulgakov, Mikhail Tugan-Baranovsky and Semyon Frank. The name was derived from the fact that its supporters promoted their ideas in legal publications.

== Overview ==
Unlike the earlier generation of Russian socialists known as narodniks (populists), who emphasized the role of the peasantry in transitioning to socialism, Legal Marxists used the economic theory of Karl Marx to argue that the development of capitalism in the Russian Empire was both inevitable and beneficial. As Struve put it, they provided a "justification for capitalism" in Russia.

Legal Marxists held numerous open debates from the mid-1890s through the early 1900s, notably at the Free Economic Society in Saint Petersburg, and published three magazines between 1897 and 1901, all of them eventually suppressed by the imperial government:

- Novoye Slovo (1897)
- Nachalo (1899)
- Zhizn (1899–1901, resumed abroad in 1902)

Legal Marxists became particularly influential after the arrest and imprisonment of the leaders of the revolutionary wing of Russian Marxism (including Julius Martov and Vladimir Lenin) in 1895-1896. Legal Marxists and revolutionary Marxists were allied in the late 1890s within the newly formed Russian Social Democratic Labor Party, whose Manifesto Struve wrote in 1898, and Legal Marxist magazines were extensively used by revolutionary Marxists living in exile or abroad to publish their writings.

== Social-democratic turn ==
However, Legal Marxists became increasingly supportive of Eduard Bernstein's revision of Marxism from 1897 on, which drew criticism from Georgy Plekhanov, Lenin and other revolutionary Marxists. Struve and other Legal Marxist leaders soon abandoned philosophical materialism for neo-Kantianism while Berdyaev, Bulgakov and Frank eventually became philosophers of religion. Tugan-Baranovsky developed a theory of cyclical economic crises under capitalism, which was also criticised by revolutionary Marxists.

Starting in 1901, Legal Marxists' abandonment of Marxism led to a break with Russian social democrats and they drifted toward liberalism with Struve editing Osvobozhdenie (Liberation), a liberal magazine, from 1902 on. Eventually the leaders of the movement became allied with the radical part of the Zemstvo within Soyuz Osvobozhdeniya (Liberation Union) in 1903-1905. Most of them were prominent supporters of the Constitutional Democratic party after the Russian Revolution of 1905.

== Significant texts ==
- The Russian Factory in the Nineteenth Century (1898) by Mikhail Tugan-Baranovsky

== Notes ==
- See, e.g., Lenin's letter to his relatives dated June 20, 1899 in A. Ulyanova-Yelizarova. "Apropos of Lenin' Letters To Relatives" in Lenin. Collected Works, Volume 37, Moscow, 1931.
