= Mikhail Tugan-Baranovsky =

Russian and Ukrainian politician and economist (1865–1919)

- Михаил Туган-Барановский
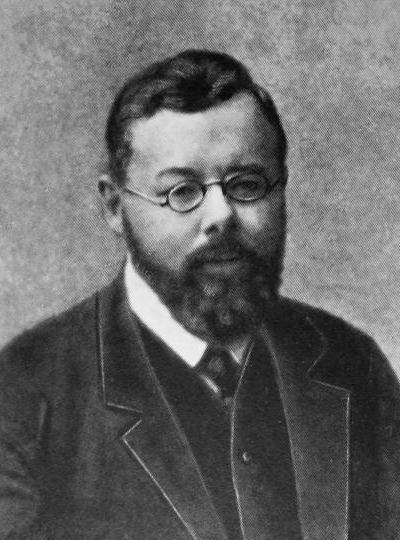

Secretary of Finance
- In office 13 August 1917 – 20 November 1917
- Prime Minister: Volodymyr Vynnychenko
- Preceded by: Khrystofor Baranovsky
- Succeeded by: Vasyl Mazurenko (temporary)

Personal details
- Born: 20 January 1865 Solone, Kupyansky Uyezd, Kharkov Governorate, Russian Empire
- Died: 21 January 1919 (aged 54) Odessa, Kherson Governorate, Ukrainian People's Republic
- Party: Cadet (until 1917), UPSF
- Education: Kharkov University
- Occupation: Academician, statesman, public activist

Mikhail Ivanovich Tugan-Baranovsky (Russian: Михаил Иванович Туган-Барановский; Ukrainian: Михайло Іванович Туган-Барановський, romanized: Mykhailo Ivanovych Tuhan-Baranovskyi; 20 January 1865 – 21 January 1919) was a Russian and Ukrainian Marxist, economist and politician.

He was a leading exponent of Legal Marxism in the Russian Empire and was the author of numerous works dealing with the theory of value, the distribution of a social revenue, history of managerial development, and fundamentals of cooperative managerial activities.

After the Russian Revolution, he was a founder of the National Academy of Sciences of Ukraine and one of the earliest Ukrainian ministers of finances in Volodymyr Vynnychenko's General Secretariat of the Central Council of Ukraine.

== Early life ==
Mikhail Ivanovich Tugan-Baranovsky was born on 8 January 1865 in the village of Solone in the Kupyansky Uyezd of the Kharkov Governorate of the Russian Empire (present-day Ukraine). His father's distant ancestors were Lipka Tatars who had come to Lithuania in the 14th century; the full family name was Tugan Mirza Baranovsky.

Tugan-Baranovsky attended high school in the cities of Kiev and Kharkov, developing an early affinity for philosophy, including the works of Immanuel Kant. In 1884 he entered Kharkov University, beginning his studies in the natural sciences. He was awarded the degree of Candidate of Sciences in 1888, but he became interested in political economy and wound up completing his studies as an external student with a degree from the school's Faculty of Law and Economics in 1890. While in college Tugan-Baranovsky became active in the revolutionary movement which sought to overthrow Tsarism in Russia, briefly making the acquaintance of Vladimir Lenin's older brother, Aleksandr Ulyanov, who was executed in 1887 for his part in the attempted assassination of Tsar Alexander III.

In November 1886 Tugan-Baranovsky was arrested for participating in a student demonstration in St. Petersburg marking the 25th anniversary of the death of critical writer Nikolay Dobrolyubov. As a result of the arrest Tugan-Baranovsky was expelled from the capital city, falling out of contact with the ill-fated older Ulyanov. Tugan-Baranovsky married the daughter of the director of the St. Petersburg Conservatory, Lydia Davydova, in 1889.

== Academic career ==
Shortly after his marriage, Tugan-Baranovsky began what would be a long running and esteemed academic career. His first scholarly article, "The Doctrine of the Marginal Utility of Economic Goods", saw print in October 1890 in the journal Iuridicheskii Vestnik (Jurisprudence Courier). In this work, which presaged his later criticism of Marxism, Tugan-Baranovsky argued that the labor theory of value and contemporary Marginalist economics were in basic agreement rather than in antagonistic opposition. This synthesis formed the basis of Tugan-Baranovsky’s unique socialist planning model.

After this first foray into theoretical economics, Tugan-Baranovsky turned his hand to the writing of biography, contributing short popular sketches of Pierre-Joseph Proudhon and John Stuart Mill to a series entitled "Lives of Remarkable Men", produced by the publisher Pavlenkov. In these roughly 80-page books Tugan-Baranovsky was highly critical of Proudhon for his lack of internal consistency, stylistic obscurity, lack of imagination, and hypocritical support of the regime of Louis Napoleon. He was much more sympathetic to Mill, hailing the economist as one who "more than anyone else helped the spread throughout the civilized world of a right understanding of the spirit of contemporary science, based on the study of nature."

Following the intellectual example of Karl Marx and Frederick Engels, Tugan-Baranovsky envisaged an inevitable path for development modelled on England for guidance for nations such as Russia to follow. He next journeyed to London in the spring and summer of 1891 to work in the British Museum, there examining the collection of rare books and statistical works. He then returned to Russia, spending two more years at work in St. Petersburg on a substantial tome of business cycle theory, Industrial Crises in Contemporary England: Their Causes and Influences on the Life of the People. Publication of the book in 1894 earned Tugan-Baranovsky a Master's degree in Political Economics from Moscow University.

The achievement of this academic rank allowed Tugan-Baranovsky to gain employment in academia, accepting an appointment as a Privatdozent (lecturer) at St. Petersburg University. In 1898 he published The Russian Factory in the Nineteenth Century. This was the first volume of a planned more extensive work dealing with the impact of factory life on Russian society. According to his student and biographer Nikolai Kondratiev, Tugan-Baranovsky retained this position until 1899, when he was dismissed for political unreliability. Nevertheless he announced that he was planning a second volume with material of a more theoretical nature in the preface to the 2nd edition published in 1900. Opinions vary as regards whether a draft manuscript of volume II was ever written.

In 1917 Tugan published a book "Paper Currency and Metal", where he presented a theory of fiat paper currency, believing that a new stage in monetary history after the war was coming. He connected the value of fiat currency with the business cycle and with aggregate demand. He proposed active monetary policy, mainly through exchange rate control. In many respects he could be considered as a forerunner of the theory of endogenous money.

== Political activities ==
In 1895 Tugan-Baranovsky and his co-thinker Peter Struve joined the Free Economical Association, of which he became the chairman in 1896. In December of that year he published a seminal article of Marxist theory, frequently reprinted, "The Significance of the Economic Factor in History", which drew the attention and written replies of leading narodnik critics such as Vasily Vorontsov and Nikolay Mikhaylovsky. In April 1900, Tugan-Baranovsky participated in the organizational meeting to create the Iskra newspaper, which later became the basis for the creation of the Russian Social Democratic Labor Party. While he consistently expressed Marxist economic and political ideas in this period, there is no indication that Tugan-Baranovsky ever joined the underground Social Democratic movement which was then emerging in Russia.

It was also during this time that his "magnum opus", The Russian Factory in Past and Present appeared. The publication of this book led in 1898 to Tugan-Baranovsky receiving a doctorate degree from Moscow University.

From 1901 to 1905 Tugan-Baranovsky participated in the public life of the Poltava region where he joined the local zemstvo (a form of local government). Later he returned to St. Petersburg, lecturing as private docent and as professor in the economics departments of various local polytechnic and commercial institutes and also at the private university of Shaniavsky in Moscow.

After February Revolution 1917 in Russian Empire he went back in Ukraine where he became a Finance minister in the government of Central Council of Ukraine (August – November 1917). Then he founded Ukrainian National University, Institute of Economic condition, and Demographic Institute in Kiev. The member of National Academy of Sciences of Ukraine (1918), a head of social-economic department (1919).

== Interest in Neokantianism ==
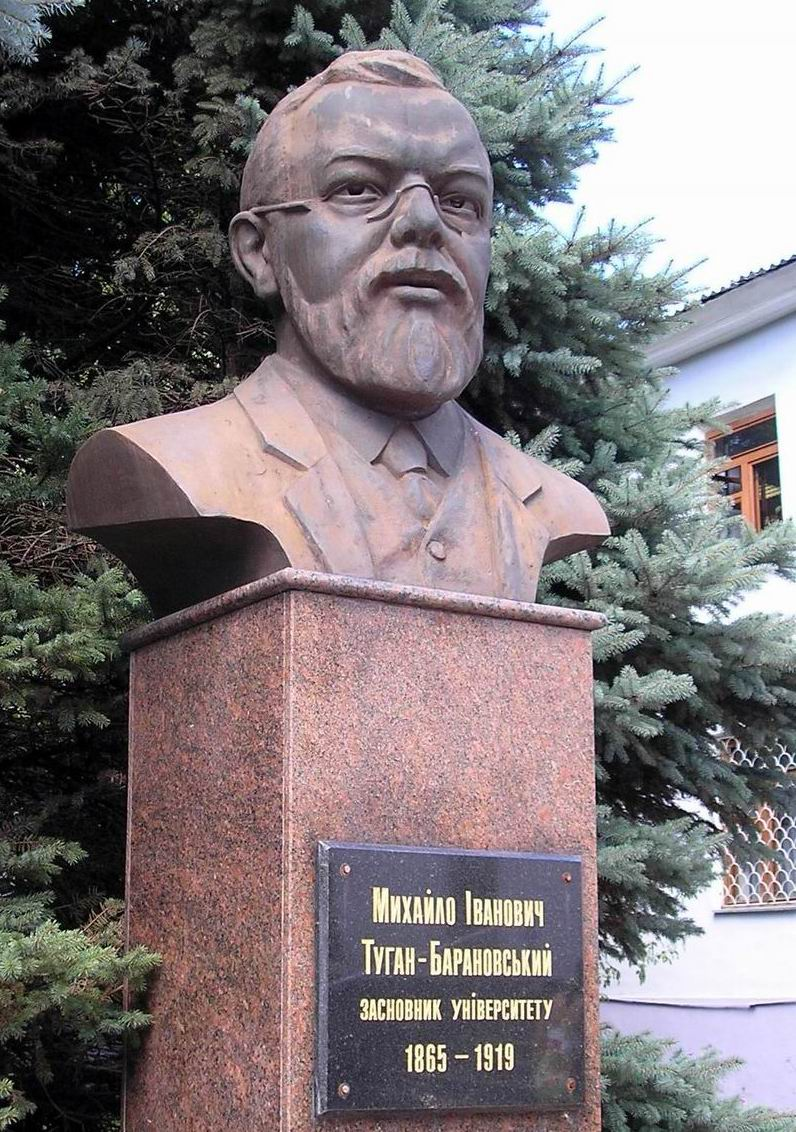
Monument to M.I. Tugan-Baranovsky (near Donetsk Commercial University).

During the early years of the 20th century he completely moved away from the popular views of legal Marxism towards the Neokantianism that is reflected in his various works regarding the cooperative movement. In 1901–1902, Tugan-Baranovsky published his "Notes from the History of Political Economics" in the journal Narodnoe Bagatstvo (National Wealth), where he described the history of economics doctrines in the Russian Empire, and "Notes of the Newest History in Political Economics" (1903). This work was translated into German in 1915. Later he published various other works in Russian and German as well.

In 1919 his first publication in Ukrainian appeared, Cooperation, its nature and goals. Other works continued to appear up until 1923. Since 1906 he was the chief editor of Vestnik Kooperatsii (Cooperative Digest). Before World War I he worked, along with Mykhailo Hrushevskyi and other Ukrainian academicians, on the encyclopedia Ukrainsky narod v ego proshlom i nastoyaschem ("The Ukrainian Nation in its Past and Present"). As the member of the Ukrainian Party of Socialist-Federalists quit the General Secretariat on 20 November 1917 in the protest to the proclamation of the Third Universal of the Ukrainian Central Council that advocated a wider autonomy to Ukraine.

Mikhail Tugan-Baranovsky was one of the founders of the National Academy of Science of Ukraine, as well as the Secretary of Finance of the Ukrainian People's Republic.

== Death ==
In January 1919, while en route via train to attend the Paris Peace Conference, Tugan-Baranovsky suffered a fatal heart attack.

== Publications ==
=== In English ===
- The Russian Factory in the Nineteenth Century (1898), Tugan-Baranovsky's PhD thesis,

=== In German ===
- Michael Tugan-Baranovsky (1900). Geschichte der russischen Fabrik (PDF) (in German). Berlin: Emil Felber.
- Michael Tugan-Baranovsky (1901). Studien zur Theorie und Geschichte der Handelskrisen in England (in German). Jena.
- Michael Tugan-Baranovsky (1905). Theoretische Grundlagen des Marxismus (PDF) (in German). Leipzig: Duncker & Humblot.
- Michael Tugan-Baranovsky (1921). Die kommunistischen Gemeinwesen der Neuzeit (PDF) (in German). Gotha: Friedrich Andreas Perthes.

== Footnotes ==
Preceded by Khrystofor Baranovsky	General Secretary of Finance of Ukraine; August 14, 1917–November 20, 1917	Succeeded by Vasyl Mazurenko (acting)
