= Wolniewicz =

Wolniewicz is a Polish surname. It may refer to:

- Adam Wolniewicz (born 1993), Polish footballer
- Bogusław Wolniewicz (1927–2017), Polish philosopher
- Claire Wolniewicz (born 1966), French journalist and writer
