= Ulrich Schrade =

Polish philosopher (1943–2009)

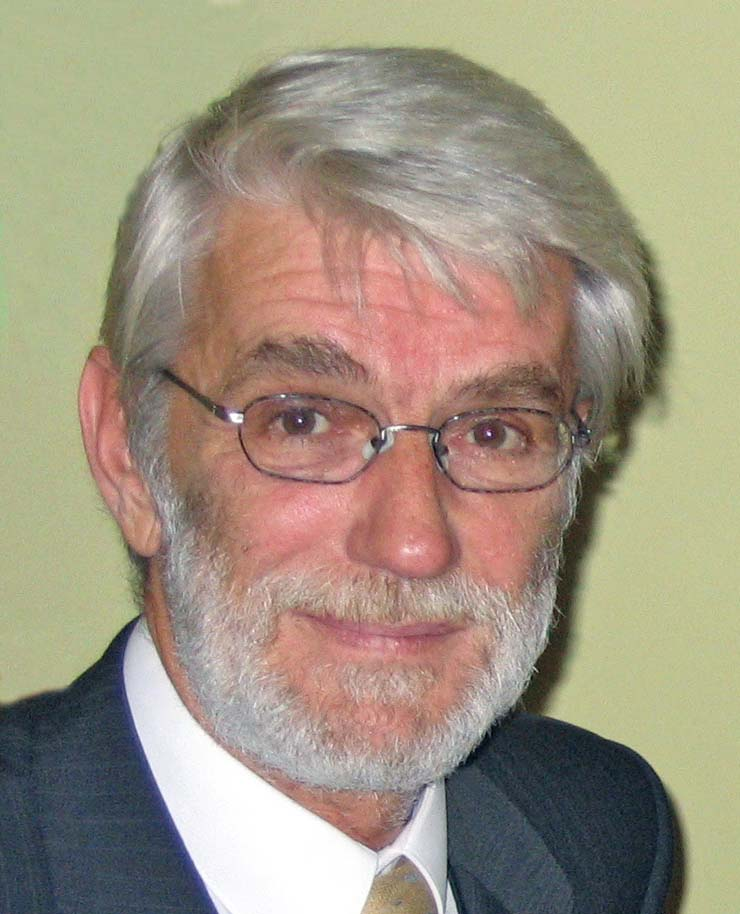
Ulrich Schrade

Ulrich Schrade (21 July 1943 in Patricken / East Prussia, now Patryki, Poland – 15 November 2009 in Warsaw, Poland) was a Polish philosopher, educationist and ethicist.

In the years 1961–1966 he studied economics under Bolesław Kasprowicz at the Higher School of Economics in Sopot, obtaining a master's degree; from 1966–1969 he worked at the construction of a tire plant in Olsztyn; in the years 1969–1974 he studied philosophy under Bogusław Wolniewicz at the University of Warsaw.

In 1976 he earned his PhD from the Faculty of Philosophy and Sociology of the University of Warsaw with a dissertation on philosophical disputes within German social democracy between 1895 and 1905, supervised by Bogusław Wolniewicz. In 1989 he completed his habilitation at the same faculty on the basis of his work Idea humanizmu w świetle aksjologii Henryka Elzenberga (The Idea of Humanism in the Light of Henryk Elzenberg's Axiology), reviewed by Barbara Skarga, Ija Lazari-Pawłowska and Jacek Hołówka. He was awarded the title of professor in 2005.

Since 1974 he worked at the Faculty of Management and Social Sciences at the Warsaw University of Technology, later part of the Faculty of Administration and Social Sciences. At this university he is considered to have founded his own philosophical school and to have been a major contributor to the theory of higher education. Until his death he held the following positions:

- Head of the Department of Philosophy
- Head of the Postgraduate Pedagogical Studies
- Head of the Pedagogical Seminar for doctoral students and young academic staff

He was a member of the Disciplinary Commission of the Council for Higher Education, and from 2001 served on the Presidium of the Main Board of the Polish Philosophical Society, acting as its treasurer. From 2005 to 2008 he was a senator of the Warsaw University of Technology and deputy director of the College of Social Sciences and Administration.

The core of his scientific interests were the general problems of anthropology, axiology and education theory. He was also a visiting professor at the Akademia Humanistyczna in Pułtusk (Pultusk Academy of Humanities). Together with Bogusław Wolniewicz, he co-edited the manuscripts of the philosopher Henryk Elzenberg, whose axiology strongly influenced his own philosophical views (see below).

He died in a traffic accident on 15 November 2009.

== Philosophical views ==
Drawing on Henryk Elzenberg's axiology, Schrade proposed a classification of humanism into two kinds: anthropocentric humanism, in which the human being is held to be a value in itself and the source of instrumental values, and axiocentric humanism, in which a person derives value from realising self-existent values, such as truth, goodness and beauty, that exist independently of them. He later applied this distinction to political philosophy in his book on interwar Polish national thought, proposing a classification of left and right based on the anthropology underlying each position (naturalism versus transcendentalism) and on attitudes toward the scope of state intervention in citizens' lives.

In ethics, he applied the same distinction between instrumental and self-existent values, and developed a formal concept of personal dignity (godność osobista), defined as faithfulness to one's own values, a state that a person loses by acting against their own values and regains through consistent action in accordance with them.

In his work on the didactics of higher education, Schrade extended the axiocentrism–naturalism distinction to pedagogy, contrasting the traditional, axiocentric pedagogy derived from Johann Friedrich Herbart with modern child-centred pedagogy (paidocentrism) based on the ideas of John Dewey, and argued that the growing mass character of higher education reflected the spread of this child-centred educational ideology rather than objective economic needs.

== Awards ==

Gold Cross of Merit of the Republic of Poland (Złoty Krzyż Zasługi), 2004

Medal of the National Education Commission (Medal Komisji Edukacji Narodowej), 1991

== Works ==
- Idea humanizmu w świetle aksjologii Henryka Elzenberga. (The idea of humanism in the light of Henryk Elzenberg's axiology.), 1988
- Etyka. Główne systemy, (Ethics. The major systems), 1992
- Nurty filozofii współczesnej. (Currents of contemporary philosophy), three editions, 1997, 2003, 2009
- Międzywojenna polska myśl narodowa. Od patriotyzmu do globalizmu. (Polish national idea of the interwar period. From patriotism to globalism), 2004
- Dydaktyka szkoły wyższej. Wybrane problemy (ed.), (College didactics. Selected Problems), 2009

== Bibliography ==
- Bogusław Wolniewicz, "Ulrich Schrade (1943–2009)", Edukacja Filozoficzna, vol. 49, 2010, pp. 75–82.
