= Kraków Society of Friends of Fine Arts =

Coordinates: 50.0640°N 19.9349°E

Kraków Society of Friends of Fine Arts Towarzystwo Przyjaciół Sztuk Pięknych w Krakowie
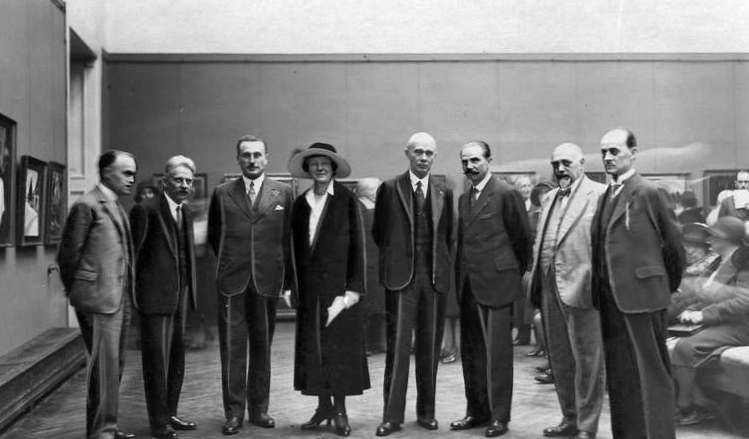
- The 1931 opening at the Palace of Art, Kraków. From right to left: deputy Mayor, future World War II hero of Kraków Stanisław Klimecki, third: Mayor Władysław Belina-Prażmowski, last: Artur Schroeder (TPSP secretary)

Operation
- Founded: 1854 – present
- Location: Kraków

The Kraków Society of Friends of Fine Arts (Polish: Towarzystwo Przyjaciół Sztuk Pięknych w Krakowie, TPSP) is a social group of artists, artisans and their supporters founded in Kraków in 1854, under the Austrian Partition of Poland. Today, the Society operates from the Art Nouveau Palace of Art erected by its own members in 1901 at the Szczepański Square in Kraków Old Town. After major renovations of the Palace in 1996, the Society organizes local and international art exhibits and numerous other art initiatives.

== History ==
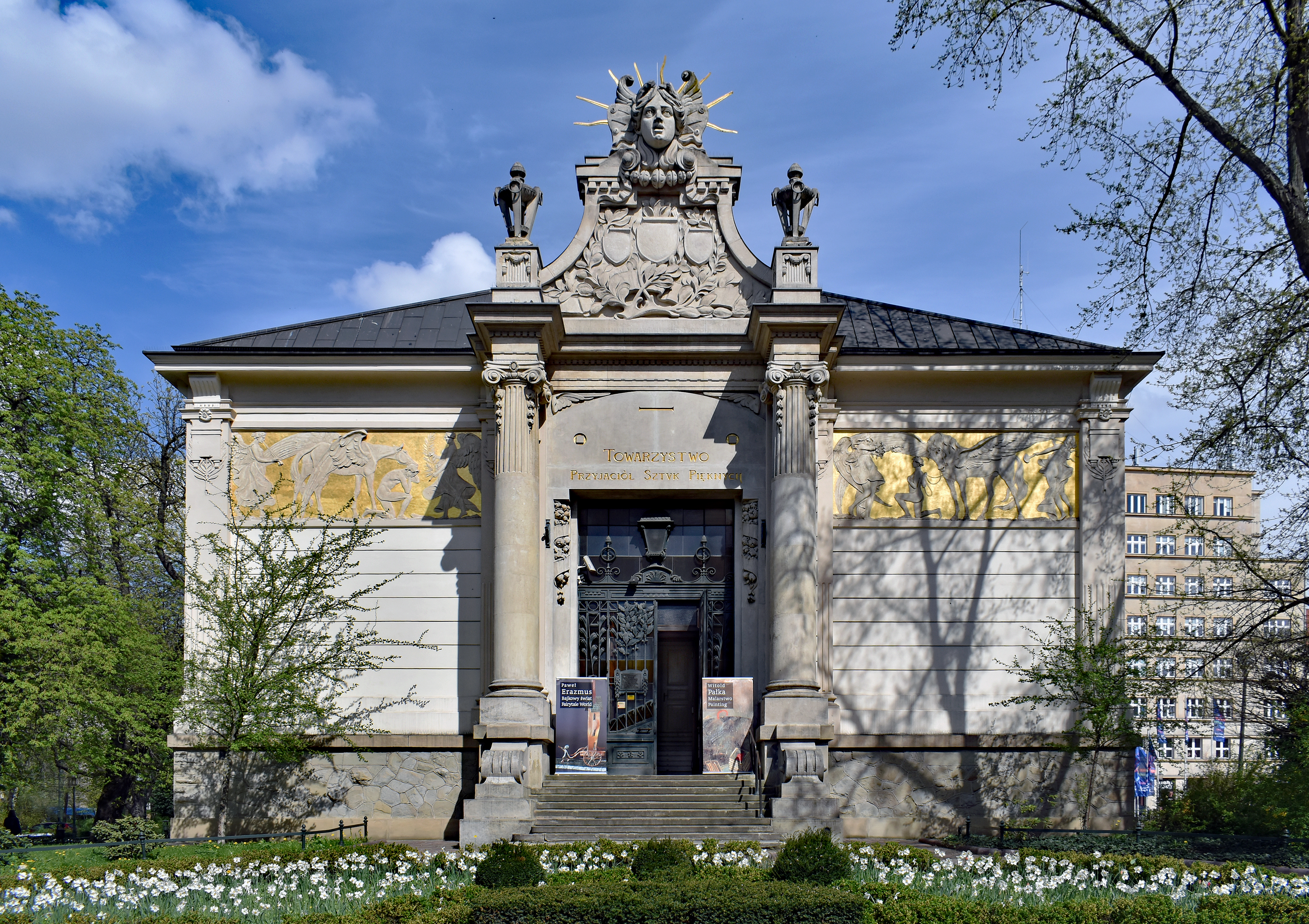
Palace of Art, also known as "Secession" headquarters of the society, in Krakow Old Town

The nonprofit Society of Friends of Fine Arts was established in Kraków in 1854 to promote Polish art and culture, against the foreign rulership of Austria-Hungary. Its initiator, Walery Wielogłowski (1805–1865), was an emigrant activist and publisher living in Cracow since 1848. TPSP's goal was to "shape the heart and disposition of the spirit towards the concept of absolute beauty, thereby developing in the nation a sense of order and harmony, without which true education, or civilization, is almost impossible."

The Society's mode of operation was based on the experiences of German and Austrian Kunstvereines - art societies. In its early years, TPSP focused on the presentation of works by Polish artists and representatives of European art, whose works were borrowed from societies in Vienna, Prague, Pest, Dresden, Munich, or Mannheim. TPSP's inaugural exhibition took place at the turn of 1854 and 1855.

The Society had a gallery at the Larisch's Palace, and later in Sukiennice, exhibiting Jan Matejko, among others. Four decades after its original founding, using public donations and funds acquired from the sale of Artur Grottger, on 26 June 1899 the Society began construction of its own Palace of Art along the Planty Park, based on a design by Franciszek Mączyński. It was influenced by the Secession Building in Vienna and is also colloquially known as "Secession" (Secesja).

After two years of meticulous construction, the gallery was ceremonially inaugurated on 11 May 1901 by the Mayor of Kraków, Count Edward Aleksander Raczyński. It was the first Art Nouveau building in the city, inspired by the Ancient Greek temples, with Apollo's sculpted head above its entrance, and Modernist reliefs on outside walls designed by Professor Jacek Malczewski from the Academy of Fine Arts in Kraków.

In early 20th century, the Palace run by the Society became one of the main exhibition venues of the Young Poland movement. Today, the reborn Society composed of members of the Rotary International upholds its original mission of promoting contemporary art, both Polish and international. It organizes art auctions on site, sponsors its own Institute of Research and artwork Documentation (Instytut Badań i Dokumentacji) and publishes art catalogues about painting, graphic arts, drawing and sculpture.
