= Franciszek Mączyński =

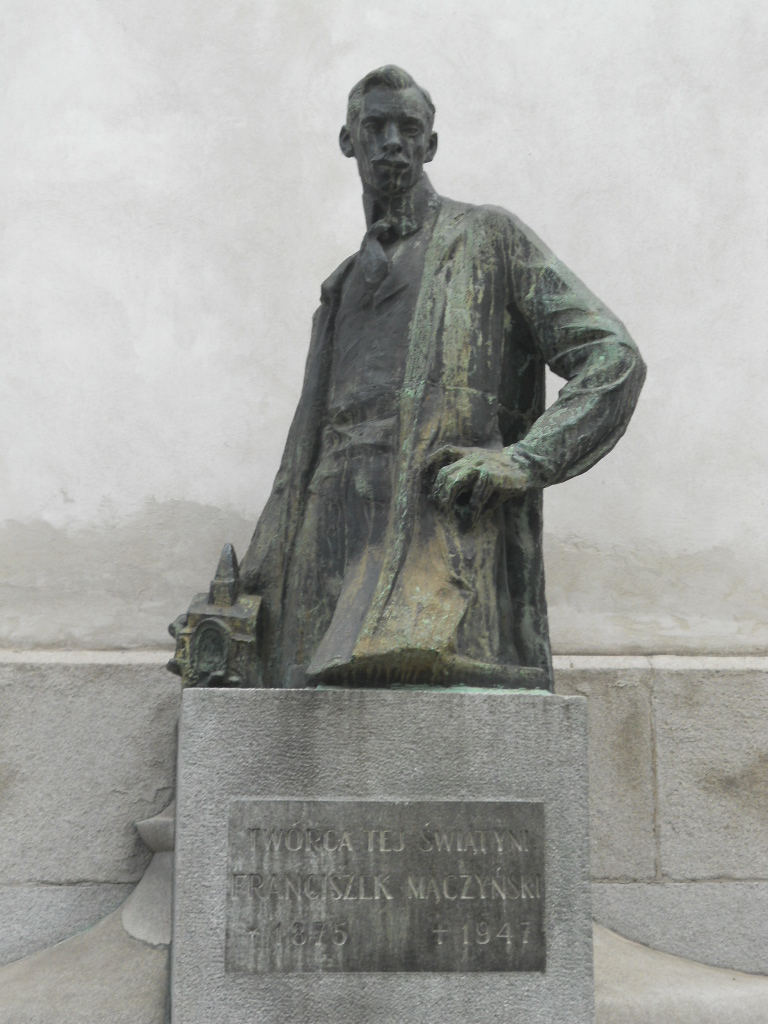
- Statue of Mączyński by Xawery Dunikowski, 1912
- Born: 21 September 1874; Wadowice
- Died: 28 June 1947 (aged 72); Kraków
- Occupation: Architect
- Known for: Palace of Art, Kraków
- Awards: Golden Laurel of the Polish Academy of Literature (1936)

Franciszek Mączyński (21 September 1874 in Wadowice – 28 June 1947 in Kraków) was a Polish Art Nouveau architect. Prominent by 1910, his commissions include several major churches, and turn-of-the-century civic and cultural institutions designed in a Polish-influenced Secession style. In 1936 he was awarded the Golden Laurel of the Polish Academy of Literature.

== Career ==
Mączyński was born in Wadowice in southern Poland. He trained with the architect Slawomir Odrzywolski, and in 1900 won an international architectural competition organized by the Paris-based magazine Moniteur des Architectes with a design of a villa in the ethnic Zakopane style.

Already accomplished as an architect, he continued his studies at the Kraków Academy of Fine Arts under Konstanty Laszczka from 1902 to 1904, and finished his education in Vienna and Paris. Mączyński's work is concentrated in Kraków.

== Design ==
Mączyński's work includes (in Kraków unless otherwise noted):

- Palace of Art (Pałac Sztuki or the Building of the Society of Friends of Fine Arts), Szczepański Square, 1898–1901
- The "House Under the Globe" for the Kraków Chamber of Commerce, with Tadeusz Stryjeński, 1904–06
- Concert Hall of the Musical Society (1903–1906), now Stary Teatr im. Heleny Modrzejewskiej.
- Basilica of the Sacred Heart of Jesus, 1909–21
- The Press Palace, originally as a Bazaar Polish SA department store, with Tadeusz Stryjeński, 1920–1921
- Cathedral of Christ the King, Katowice, with architect Zygmunt Gawlik, begun 1927, completed 1955
- Church of the Immaculate Conception of the Blessed Virgin Mary, 1929–32
- Piłsudski's Mound, 1934–37.

== Designed by Franciszek Mączyński ==
Buildings:

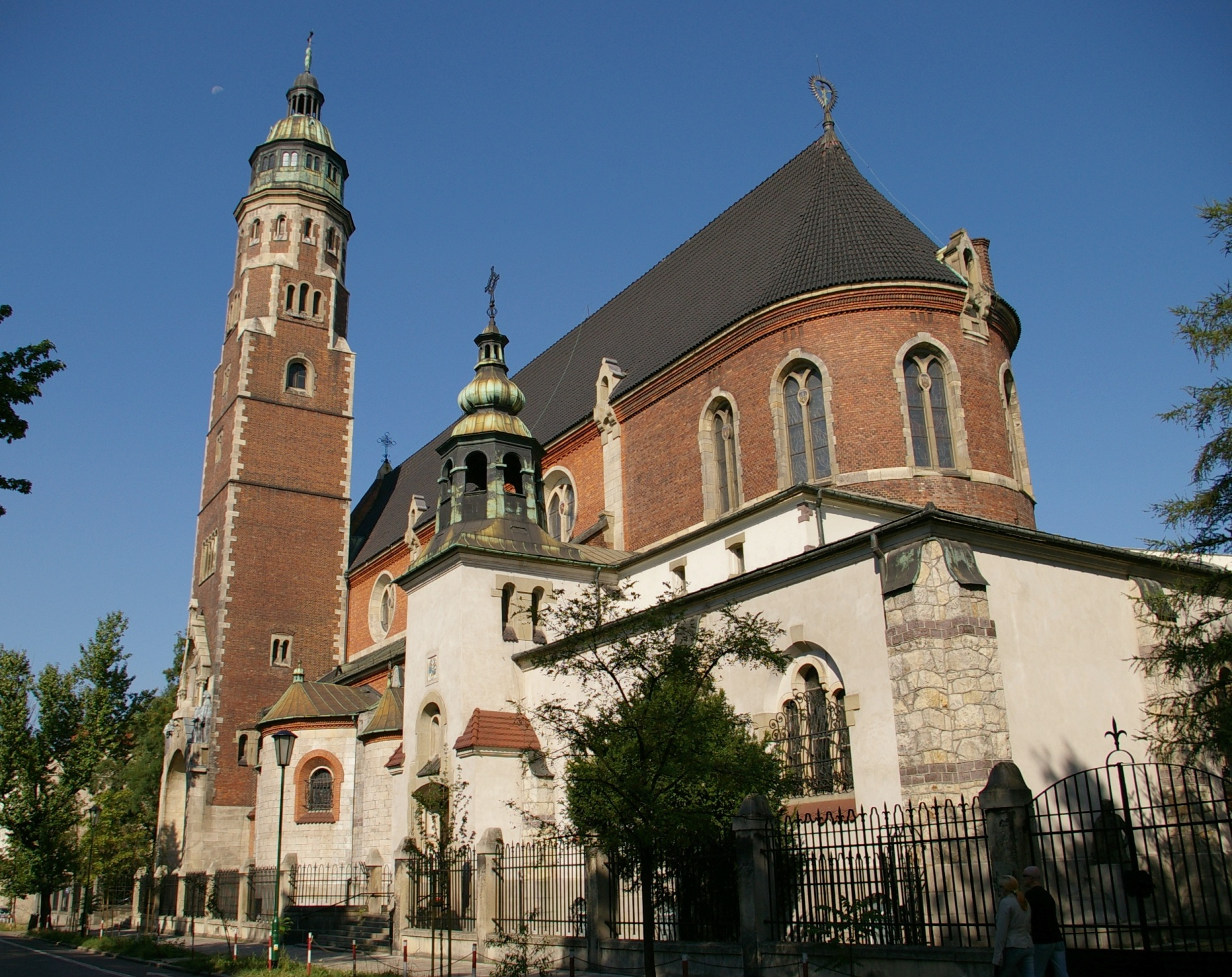
Basilica of the Sacred Heart of Jesus in Kraków

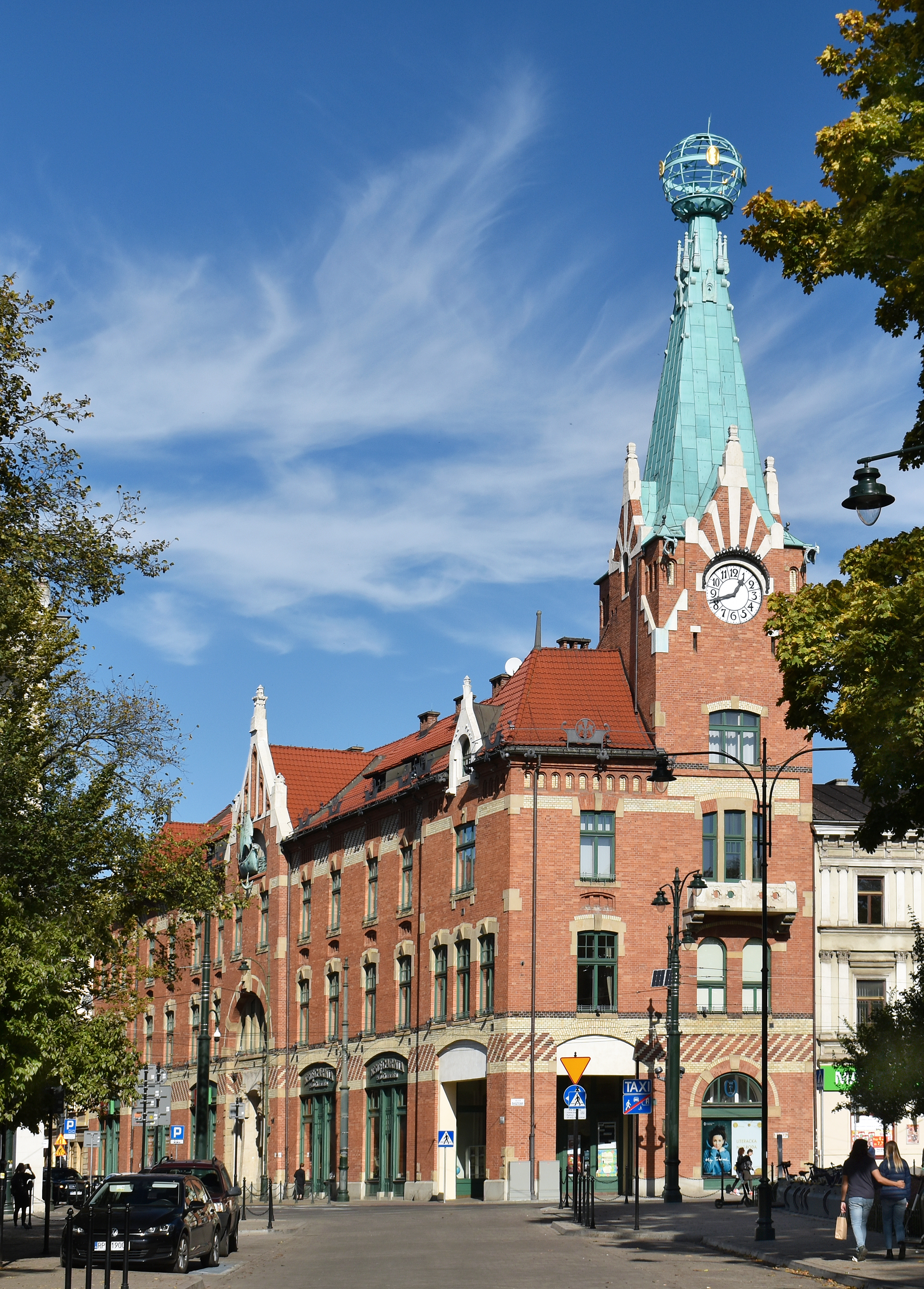
House Under the Globe, Kraków

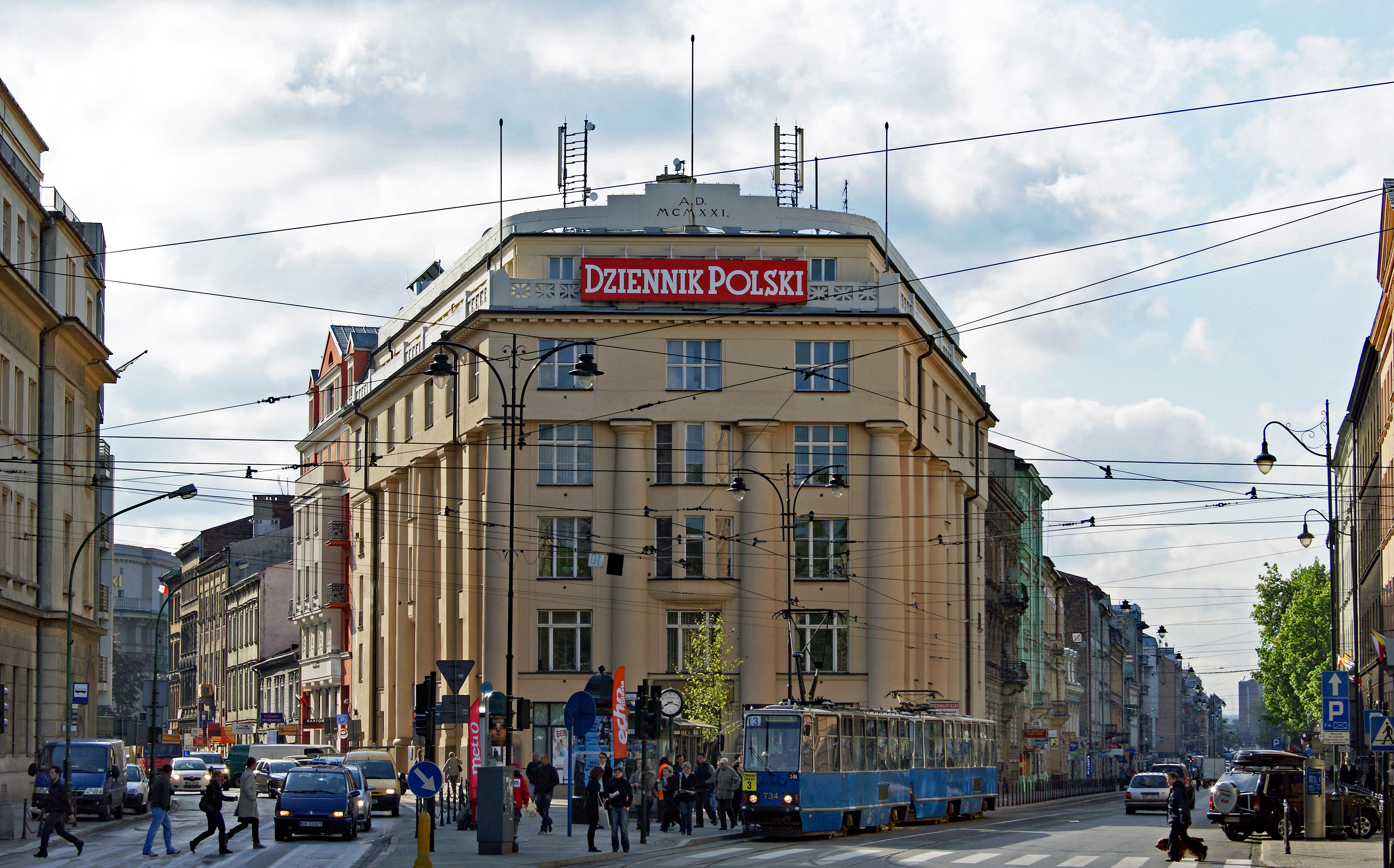
The Press Palace, Kraków

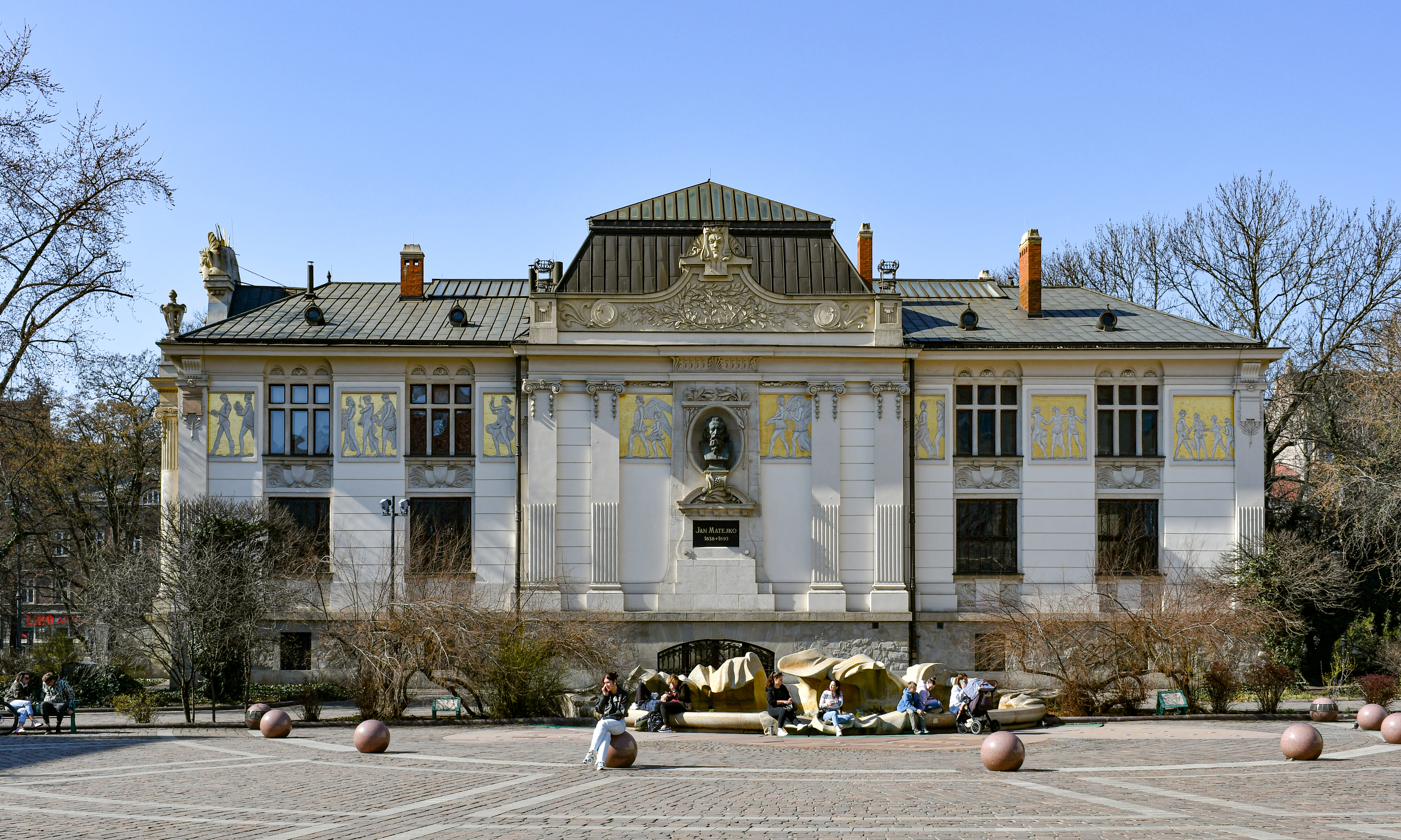
Palace of Art in Kraków

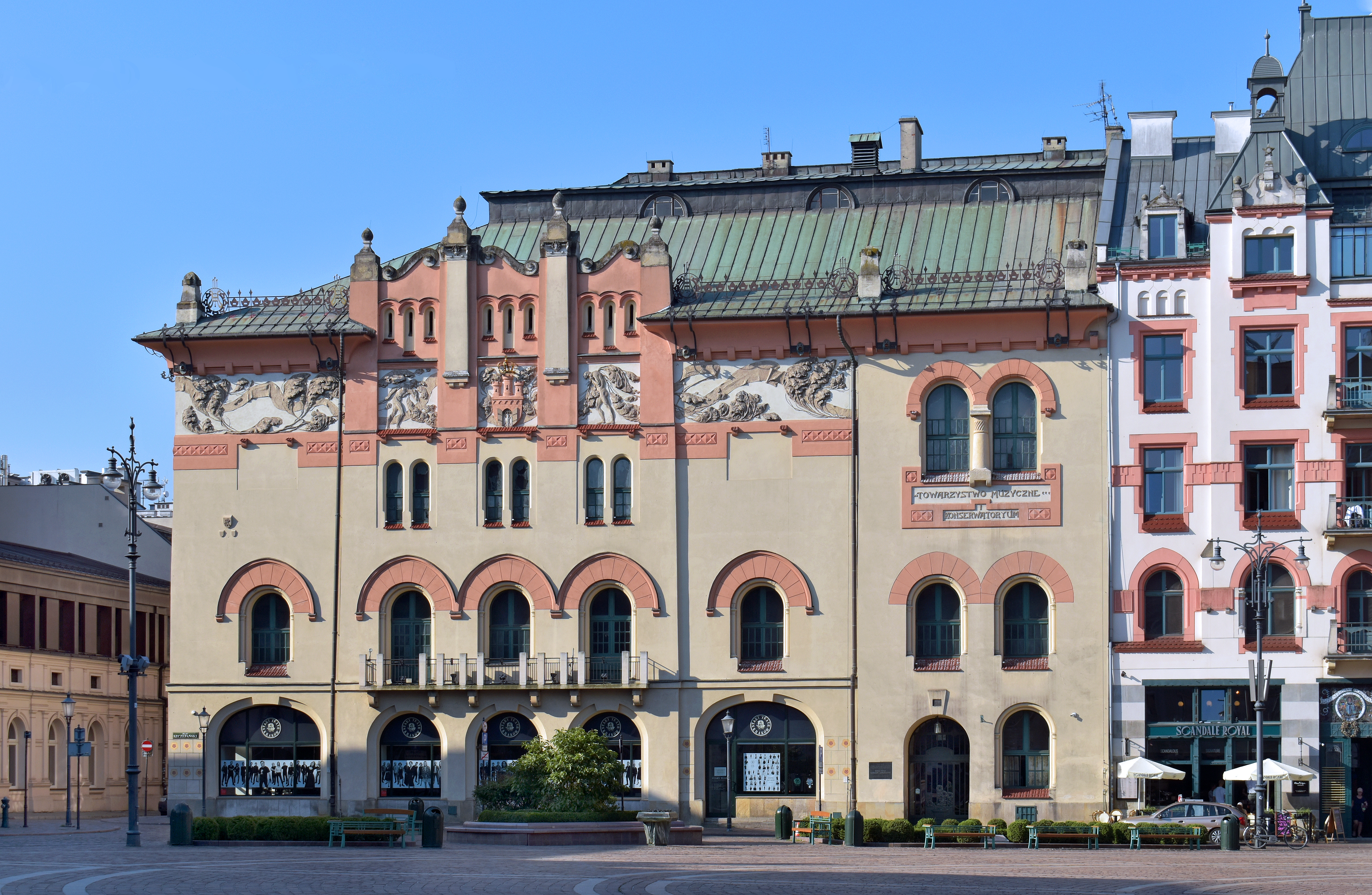
The Old Theater (Teatr Stary) in Kraków

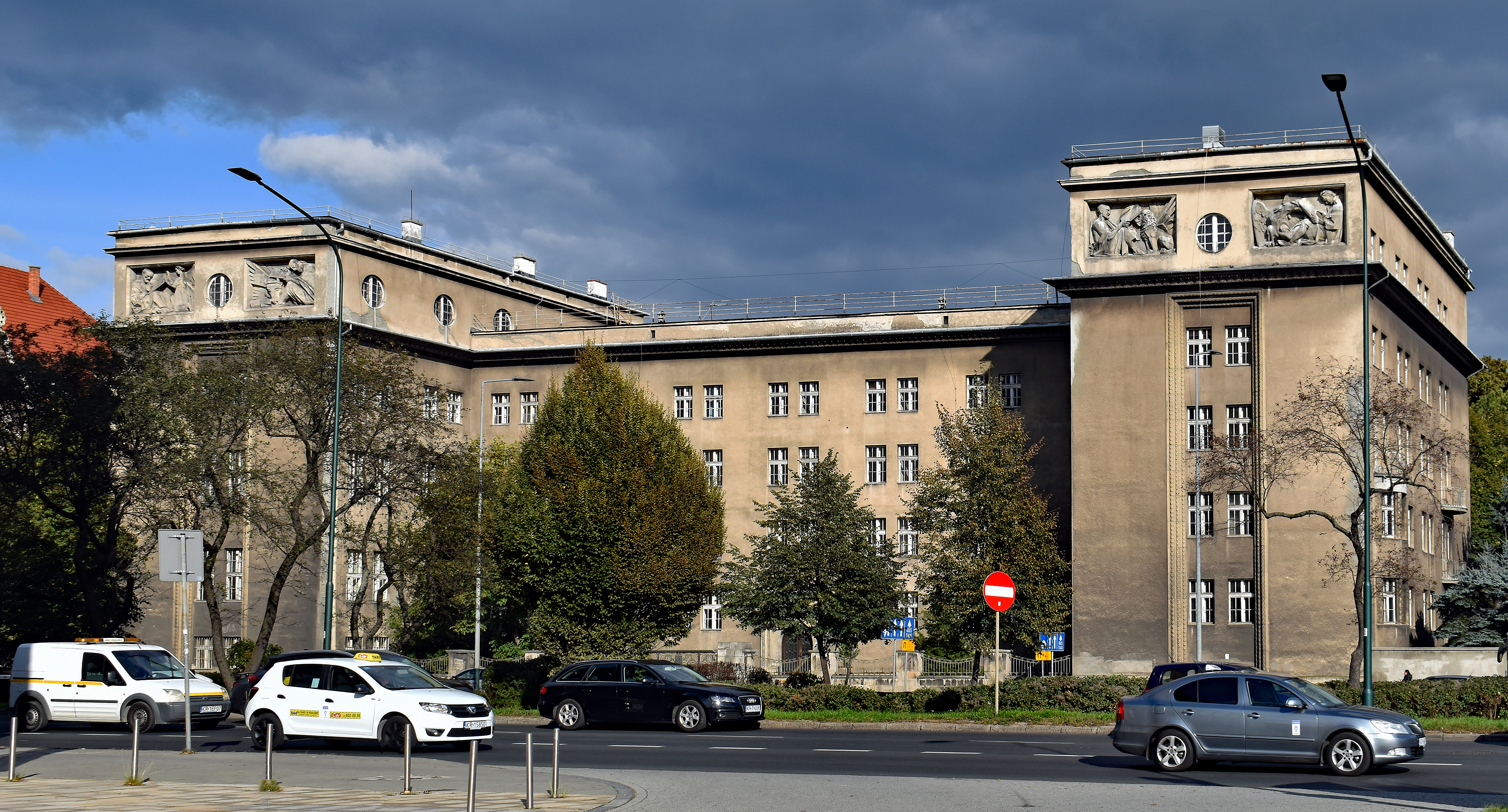
Former Śląskie Seminary Building, Kraków

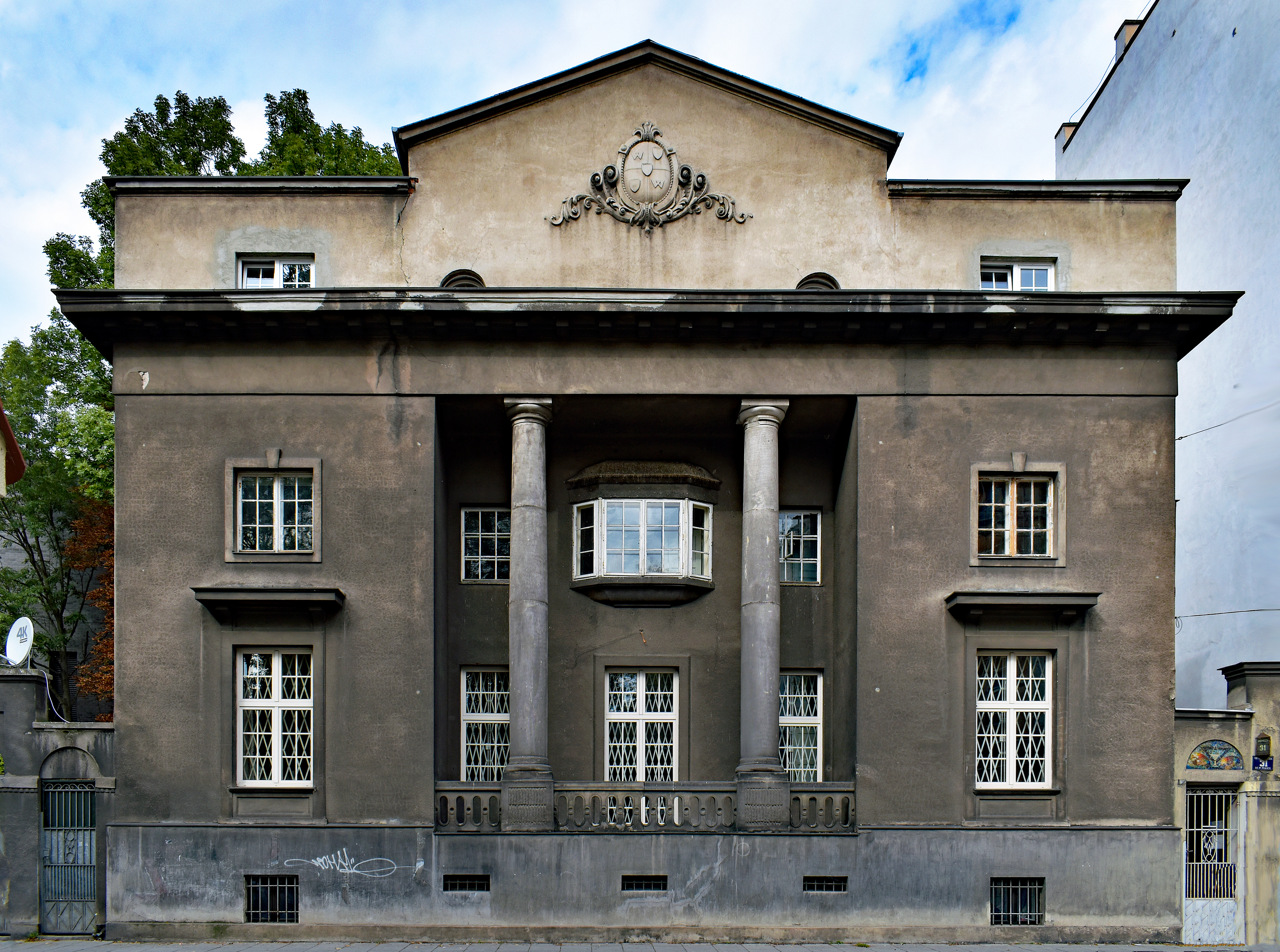
Wojciech Weiss villa, Kraków

Stained glass windows:

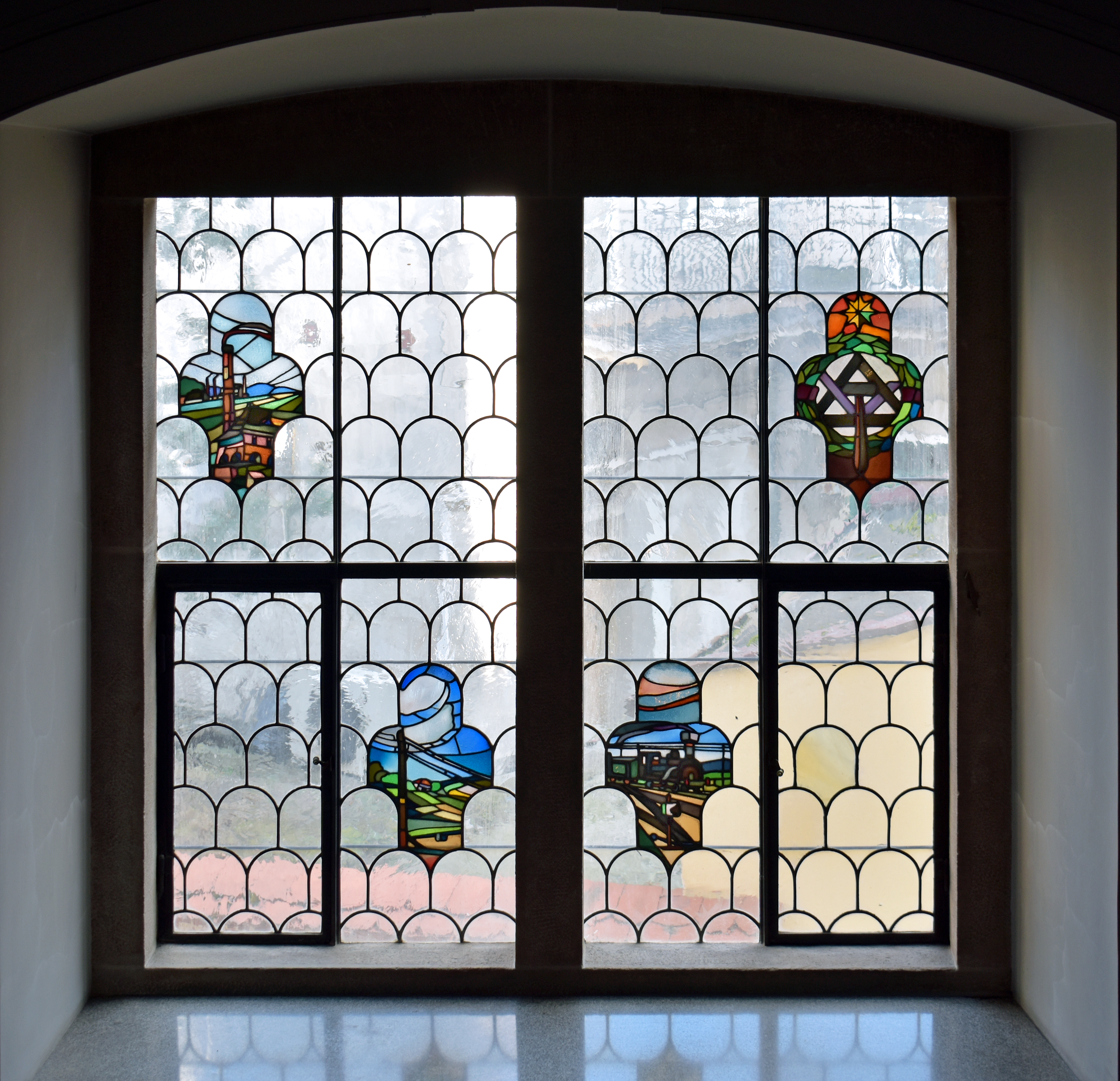
House Under the Globe (1904)

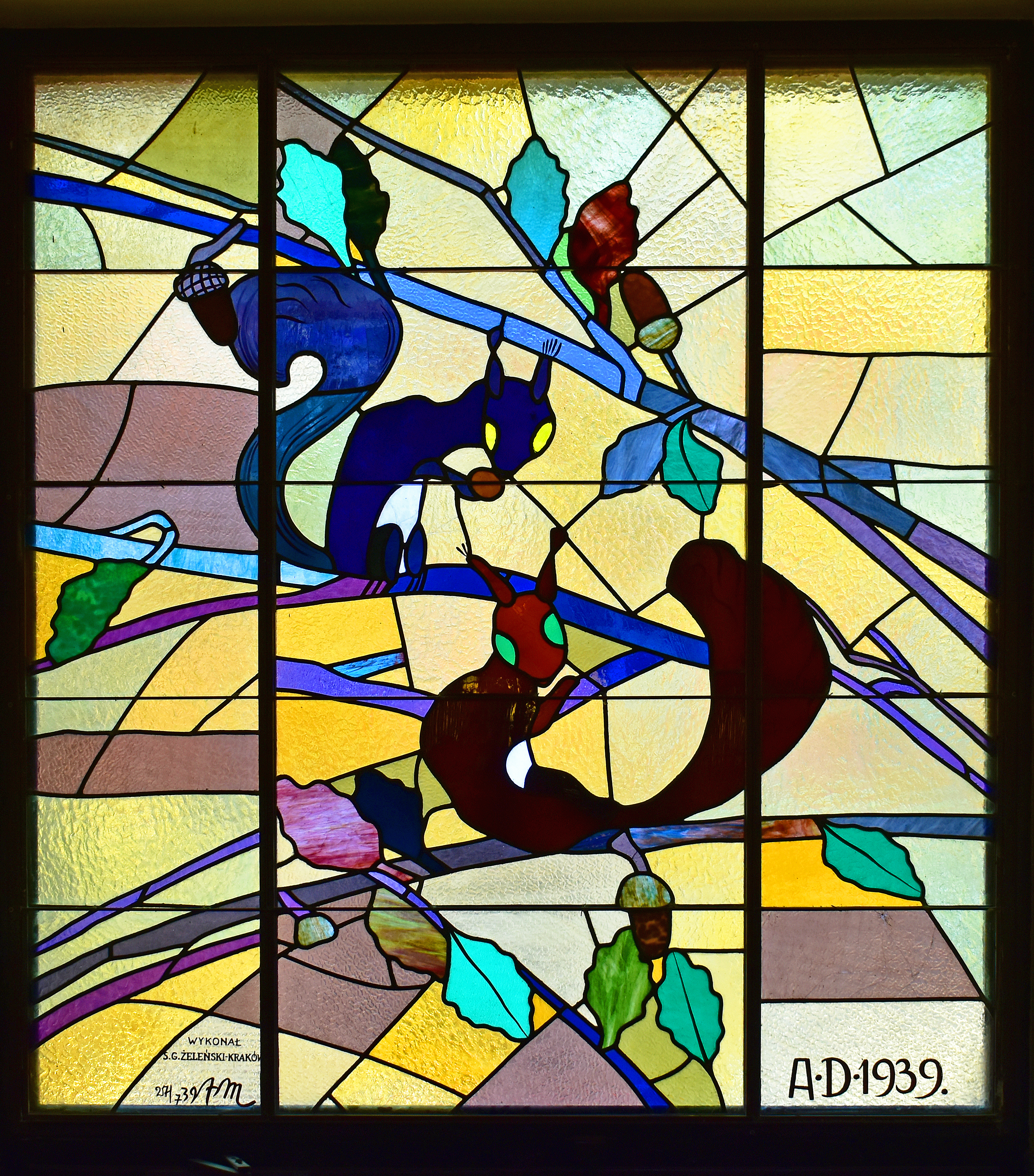
5 Dunin-Wąsowicza Street
Tenement house (1939)
