= Mieczysław Omyła =

- Born: Mieczysław Władysław Omyła; 1941 (age 83–84)
- Occupation: Professor of humanities

Academic work
- Discipline: Philosophy

Mieczysław Władysław Omyła (born 1941) is a Polish professor of humanities, logician, philosopher. He is a lecturer in logic and philosophy at the Cardinal Stefan Wyszyński University in Warsaw.

== Education and career ==
=== Biography ===
He comes from Soblówka. He was a student of Roman Suszko and an associate of Bogusław Wolniewicz.

He continued Suszko's logical and ontological works, often referring to Wolniewicz's ontology of the situation. In 1991 he became the Head of the Logic Department at the Institute of Philosophy of the University of Warsaw. In 1997 he obtained the academic title of professor of humanities. He was a member of the Polish Semiotic Society (Polish: Polskie Towarzystwo Semiotyczne) and the Polish Academy of Sciences (Polish: Polska Akademia Nauk).

Janusz Wesserling obtained a PhD degree under his supervision, .

== Selected works ==
- Paradygmat fregowski a teorie sytuacji (English: The frigate paradigm and theories of the situation) (2009)
- Remarks on Non-Fregean Logic (2007)
- Homomorfizm semantyczny a reifikacja sytuacji (English: Semantic homomorphism and reification of the situation) (2006)
- Aksjomat Fregego a ekstensjonalność (English: Frege's axiom and extensionality) (2005)
