= Barbara Skarga =

Polish philosopher (1919–2009)

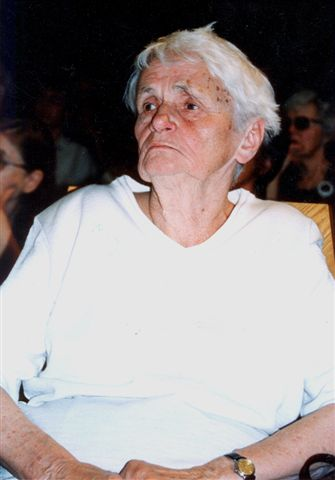
- Skarga in 2000
- Born: 25 October 1919; Warsaw, Poland
- Died: 18 September 2009 (aged 89); Olsztyn, Poland

Philosophical work
- Era: 20th-century philosophy
- Region: Western Philosophy
- School: Philosophy of dialogue
- Main interests: Epistemology, humanity, ontology, ethics

Barbara Skarga (25 October 1919 – 18 September 2009) was a Polish philosophy historian and philosopher who worked mainly in ethics and epistemology.

== Biography ==
Skarga was born in 1919 at Warsaw to a Calvinist family with gentry roots. Her sister was actress Hanna Skarżanka and brother was Edward Skarga.

Skarga studied philosophy at Wilno University. During World War II, she was a member of the resistance movement Armia Krajowa. In 1944 the Soviet NKVD arrested and sentenced her to ten years at the katorga. Afterwards, she was forced to live at a collective farm. After the war she wrote an anonymous memoir about her time in the gulag.

She returned to Poland in 1955 and graduated in 1957 with a Ph.D. in philosophy at the University of Warsaw. In 1988 she became a full professor of philosophy.

Skarga was an editor-in-chief of Etyka. In 1995, she was awarded Order of the White Eagle.

Skarga died on 18 September 2009 in Olsztyn, and was buried in Warsaw.

In 2022, the Barbara Skarga Foundation is based in Warsaw and offers a scholarship to unpublished philosophers.

== Bibliography ==
- Narodziny pozytywizmu polskiego 1831-1864 (1964)
- Kłopoty intelektu. Między Comte'em a Bergsonem (1975)
- Czas i trwanie. Studia nad Bergsonem (1982)
- Po wyzwoleniu 1944-1956 (1985)
- Przeszłość i interpretacje (1987)
- Granice historyczności (1989)
- Tożsamość i różnica. Eseje metafizyczne (1997)
- Ślad i obecność (2002)
- Kwintet metafizyczny (2005)
- Człowiek to nie jest piękne zwierzę (2007)
- Tercet metafizyczny (2009)
