= Bogusław Wolniewicz =

Polish philosopher (1927–2017)

- Born: September 22, 1927; Toruń, Poland
- Died: August 4, 2017 (aged 89); Warsaw, Poland
- Occupations: Professor of philosophy, radio personality

Academic background
- Education: University of Warsaw

Academic work
- Discipline: Philosophy

Bogusław Wolniewicz (September 22, 1927 – August 4, 2017) was a Polish philosopher. He was a professor at University of Warsaw from 1963 to 1998. In scholarly circles, he is known as a translator and commentator of Ludwig Wittgenstein. From the 1990s, he became a publicist mostly affiliated with the Radio Maryja community. His controversial views were often regarded as anti-Semitic and Islamophobic.

== Education and career ==
=== Biography ===
He started his education in 1934 in a Polish primary school. The war didn't interrupt his education, as no later than November 1939 he was already a student at a German primary school for Poles with a significantly lowered level of education. In 1941 he started working at Hermann Klechowitz's construction company while also attending a Berufsschule (trade school) affiliated with that company. From 1945 he studied at Queen Jadwiga High School, passing his final exams in 1947. In the years 1947–1951 he studied at the Nicolaus Copernicus University. Among his teachers were Tadeusz Czeżowski, Henryk Elzenberg, Tadeusz Szczurkiewicz and Kazimierz Sośnicki. In 1951 he got his master's degree in philosophy, his thesis "Criticism of subjective idealism" in V. I. Lenin’s "Materialism and Empirio-criticism" supervised by Czeżowski. Then he worked as a deputy assistant, and later as an assistant at the Department of Logic at the Nicolaus Copernicus University. In 1953 (the height of Stalinism), due to having his freedom of doing philosophical research limited, Wolniewicz quit his academic career, getting a job at the W-8 department of the Labor Union Association (Poznań), the Institute of Hydraulic Engineering at the Polish Academy of Sciences (Gdańsk), the Voivodeship Council of Trade Unions and at one of the State Agricultural Farms.

In 1956 he started working at the Department of Philosophy at the Pedagogical University in Gdańsk. In 1962 he became a doctor of humanities, his dissertation "Semantics of plain language in Wittgenstein’s new philosophy" written under supervision of prof. Czeżowski and reviewed by Izydora Dąmbska and Henryk Elzenberg. In 1963, on the initiative of Adam Schaff, he was transferred to the Department of Philosophy at the University of Warsaw. In 1967 he became a docent of humanities with specialization in philosophy, his dissertation "Study of Wittgenstein’s philosophy", reviewed by Tadeusz Kotarbiński, Adam Schaff, Roman Suszko and Peter Geach. From 1968, he worked as a full-time docent at the Department of Philosophy at the University of Warsaw. From 1969, he was a supervisor of the Subdivision of Philosophy, quitting two years later. Since the late 1960s, he started becoming famous abroad. In 1967, at the University of Chicago (as a visiting associate professor) he gave a trimester lecture on ontology of objects and facts. The same year, he gave a talk at the University of Boston and Cornell University. In 1968 he was one of the four lecturer at the Colloquium of the International Wittgenstein Congress in Vienna. In 1970 he gave a talk at the University of Moscow. In 1972 at the Temple University in Philadelphia, as a visiting professor, he gave a semester lecture on social philosophy and a seminar on Wittgenstein's philosophy. In 1975 he gave talks at the University of Cambridge and the University of Leeds on language and codes as well as the Hume's law, at the invitation of the dean of the Faculty of Philosophy at the University of Cambridge.

In 1989 he switched from the Institute of Philosophy to the Institute of Philosophy of Religion, becoming a supervisor two years later and running the institution until 1998.

Wolniewicz retired in 1997, but continued giving lectures – however, in 1998 The Scientific Council of the Department of Philosophy and Sociology at the University of Warsaw didn't extend his job contract. Wolniewicz cited the reason behind it to be a disapproval of a decision to lower teaching standards. He devoted himself to scientific research ever since. During the first semester of the 2008/2009 academic year Wolniewicz returned to the Institute of Philosophy at the University of Warsaw and gave a guest monograph lecture, as a former professor of the University.

== Thought ==
He specialized in philosophy of religion and modern philosophy. He distanced himself from the main philosophical trends of the 20th century and accepted theses by "great thinkers", like: Aristotle, Leibniz, Hume, Kant and especially Wittgenstein. Critical towards Freudianism, phenomenology, post-modernism and religious fundamentalism, and partially towards Marxism, he represented an analytical and metaphysical approach. The main assumptions of his beliefs were axiological absolutism in the rationalist version and metaphysical pessimism in looking at man and society. His entire philosophical system was based on his ontology of situation, which Wolniewicz treated mainly as a philosophical tool.

=== Metaphilosophical views ===
He believed that philosophy was not science, but it wasn't cognitively idle either and did have characteristics of a knowledge – that's because not every type of knowledge is of scientific nature, just like history or a legal case are not science either. Philosophy is an attempt to rationally capture those issues where the knowledge of scientific type does not apply. It fills the gaps in knowledge for the branches that science hadn't covered in a particular period of history, but also due to the changes to conditions of social life its goals will never become exhausted. Quite the opposite, the role of philosophy keeps growing in the commotion of modern social life.

Philosophy has a nature of common-sense cognition: it articulates that every person could get to use common sense while also pondering deep enough in the process. Therefore, there is nothing exploratory about it, there are only obvious things, but they're also subjected to a logical order. Logic brings philosophy closer to science, but it's not just about providing philosophy with formal tools, but about giving philosophy with tools for creating clear thoughts, which in turn makes it possible to tell the truth from lie in the entire cognition of non-scientific nature.

Although the need for philosophy keeps rising in today's world, the modern state of philosophical culture is bad. There's a characteristic contrast between the opulence of philosophical literature and scarcity of ideas – Wolniewicz referred to this philosophical literature that is devoid of substantial ideas as "philosophical wastepaper". He put it apart from "philosophical literature", which included "antiquarian philosophy", which examines the evolution of ideas and relations between them, combined with a lack of interest in the actual value of the discussed views, and the "substantive philosophy", which attempts to cast light upon actual problems of the era in its aim for the truth. However, the academic philosophy isn't the only possible "substantive philosophy", the essayistic and literary creativity is equally important here, as it helps overcome the antiquarism that dominates the academic philosophy.

The substantive philosophy also divides here into two opposing trends: hermeneutical philosophy and analytical philosophy. According to hermeneutical philosophy, the goal of philosophy is to reveal the purpose of existence. Of all things, the mean of which is the ability to deeply immerse oneself in the old-time philosophy and eloquence that makes it possible to bring out the same feelings in people – Wolniewicz was critical towards the "hermeneutic philosophy", considering it to be a type of new gnosis, a form of extreme irrationalism. In opposition to the hermeneutic philosophy stands analytical philosophy, which recognized the existence of objective truth and the human mind's ability to discover it. Wolniewicz crossed the division between rationalism (today represented by the analytical philosophy) and irrationalism (today represented by the hermeneutic philosophy) with the division of philosophy into naturalism, which sees a part of nature in the man, and the whole of existence in nature, and anti-naturalism (transcendentalism), which proposes the existence of supernatural reality. One example of naturalistic rationalism could be positivism, of antinaturalistic rationalism - the early Wittgenstein's philosophy (from "Tractatus Logico-Philosophicus"), of the naturalistic irrationalism - the New Age, Freudianism and late Wittgenstein's philosophy (from "Philosophical Investigations"), of the antinaturalistic irrationalism – phenomenology and existentialism. Wolniewicz himself considered himself to be a rationalist and antinaturalist. The division is presented in the table below (it is worth noting that the largest oppositions are marked by diagonals):

Wolniewicz's division of philosophical views
	rationalism	irrationalism
naturalism	positivism Tadeusz Kotarbiński	Freudianism New Age late Wittgenstein's philosophy
antinaturalism	early Wittgenstein's philosophy Bogusław Wolniewicz	phenomenology existentialism

=== Theology ===
The theological ideas in Wolniewicz's thinking are mostly contained in his article "Criticism of theodicy in Bayle". This article contains dissent with Pierre Bayle's views on the topic of theodicy. The classical theodicy said that God's goodness and omnipotence are possible to coexist since evil is not God's invention but man's – the man on the other hand, in order to do good, has to be free, and since he's free, he has to be able to do evil as well. Bayle reasoned against the classic theodicy by saying that although freedom implies the ability to do evil, it doesn't imply its necessity, therefore evil can be avoided even when assuming human freedom.

When searching for arguments that could refute the legitimacy of Bayle's argumentation, Wolniewicz referred himself to non-standard modal concepts borrowed from Megarian logic. Its representative, Diodorus Cronus presented a prospective understanding of abilities, defining what's possible as what is or will be. Such understanding of ability is still not enough to oppose Bayle's argumentation against theodicy in line with theology, as it accepts the concept that those who are saved will sin in future, too – therefore Wolniewicz constructed a slightly different definition of ability that he calls "pseudo-Diodoric". According to that definition, because something can happen it means that something similar has already happened or will happen in the future. With such a definition of ability, the classic theodicy is logically sound and not subject to the criticism submitted by Bayle.

=== Anthropology ===
Wolniewicz’s anthropological views can be described by the following concepts: anti-naturalism, rationalism, nativism, Manichaeism (this is, recognizing the existence of irrational evil in humans) and voluntarism. The human soul strives after truth and is irreducible to nature. Language is the carrier of truth, and man is its vessel. Truth is knowable due to the fact that the logical structure of language reflects somehow the metaphysical structure of the world. The ability to use language, in turn, is innate.

A human being is considered by Wolniewicz primarily as the totality of possibilities written in a DNA chain, of which not all are being realized. Moreover, in human genetic code there are potencies both for evil and for good. According to Wolniewicz, the former are stronger than the latter. Wolniewicz argues that there are two kinds of people: those whose tendencies towards evil are enormous and those whose tendencies are moderate. The task of community is to fight the former ones and support the latter ones. Communities are natural and necessary, but they cannot exist without some level of xenophobia.

Wolniewicz also criticizes all anthropological concepts that state that reason can dictate any imperatives to the will. The will dictates it to itself, and this is its source of freedom.

=== Axiology ===
In the field of axiology, Wolniewicz continued the work of Henryk Elzenberg, yet despite absorbing many of his fundamental ideas, he transformed them and rephrased them. He tried to transform Elzenberg's axiology in the spirit of objectivism and rationalism. Like Elzenberg, he divided the entire axiology into the formal and substantive one, covering the former using the conceptual apparatus of the semantics of possible worlds and situational ontology. Formal axiology formulates hypothetical judgments regarding values. It answers the questions of what values are (logic and metaphysics of values), how to recognize them (epistemology of values) and what impact they have on people (anthropology of values). Substantive axiology uses categoric judgments in which it assigns specific values to specific objects.

While aiming for simplicity of the system, Wolniewicz assigned one ontic category to all values – out of the most often highlighted ontic categories of objects (thing, thing's state, process, event, trait, relation), values are (possible) states of things.

=== Philosophy of culture and views on Christianity ===
Bogusław Wolniewicz believed that there is no Providence and that people are left on their own. He didn't believe in life after death, either. He didn't deny existence of „supreme intelligence”, though. In many matters he disagreed with the Church, but he respected it and believed it (and Christianity as a whole) to be one of the foundations of the western civilization. According to Wolniewicz, religion is one of the constants of human nature. Death is the root of religion and religion can exist only because man is a combination of reason and death. The essence of religiosity is an individual and personal attitude to death, which shouldn’t be reduced only to emotion of fear.

=== Philosophy of law ===
His philosophy of law is mostly a reflection, related to the philosophy of culture, on the place of law in the European civilization, the result of which are his views on capital punishment. According to Wolniewicz, the Roman law is the third foundation of the European civilization, after the scientific view of the world and the Christian religion. The foundation of the Roman law, on the other hand, is the principle of justice formulated by Cicero and Ulpian cuique suum tribuere ("may all get their due"). In this rule, justice isn't formulated in a utilitarian way, which is as a group of benefits that can be achieved by following some rules, but in an objective one, as it refers to the internal moral order. A crime is a violation of such order, whereas punishment is a restoration of it. Due to the objectivity of the moral order of the world, a just punishment can only depend on the severity of guilt: it cannot depend on any external benefits that could alternatively be referred to from increasing or lowering the punishment in a way that is inadequate to the guilt. Therefore, punishment is not some form of vengeance that society imposes on the criminal, as revenge only magnifies the harm that was done – on the other hand, it's a rightful retaliation, that evens out said harm, but independently of particular benefits and losses that someone could potentially experience out of that.

In his view, concepts of punishment different from the one based on the Roman principle of justice appeared in (particularly harshly criticized by him) the Enlightenment culture. He distinguishes two such concepts here (similar to his own, defined as a retribution concept): preventive, which says that punishment is mostly a measure to prevent crimes and corrective, which says that the purpose of punishment is to up bring and rehabilitate. Both those concepts contradict the Roman principle of justice, as they assign utilitarian functions to punishment and reject the principle of strict adequacy between the guilt and the punishment that only depends on it. Therefore, the preventive and corrective concepts favor the abolition of death penalty (abolitionism), the retribution concept, on the other hand, favors upholding it (rigorism). For abolitionists, the greatest value is human life, therefore it has to be protected at all costs, for a rigorist on the other hand, the greatest value is humanity. Therefore actions that cross the borders of it have to be punished with death as the only thing adequate to the guilt.

Wolniewicz believed that the objection to the death penalty that is present so often these days is a result of a crisis of the European culture as a whole. The essence of law is a positive faith in correctness of the rules – the "living law" that beacons the society. The atrophy of this faith and the adversity to protecting the social order make law dead, a paper record devoid of actual meaning to people. The atrophy of awareness of the law in society leads to atrophy of the will to fight evil, a doubt in the moral order and consequently, to the triumph of evil. He says that the most likely consequence of such a state of affairs will be the birth of new totalitarianism.

=== Contemporary ethical and social problems ===
Bogusław Wolniewicz was critical towards academic bioethics and bioethics commissions. He considered them to be a hybrid of power and pseudoscience that aims to replace human conscience. Practicing ethics, as well as other areas of philosophy, should rely on careful listening to the voice of conscience and precise formulation of what that voice says.

Wolniewicz was analysing the fundamental ethical problems of the present day: capital punishment, euthanasia, transplants, embryo-cloning and abortion.

He believed that the legalization of euthanasia is an inevitable consequence of the biomedical breakthrough that took place in the second half of the 20th century. He criticized the attitude of the Catholic Church, which strongly opposes it. He considered the arguments against the legalization of euthanasia to be demagogic. According to Wolniewicz, in some situations, when life becomes a senseless torment, everybody should have right to decide about ending his existence. He also believed that doctors should not participate in this act: their role in the procedure would be limited to recognizing that the patient's condition is irreversible (in doubtful cases, the decision should be made in favor of the sick person in accordance with his will) and to prescribing an appropriate drug, the use of which results in death. Direct assistance in dying should belong to the patient's family or another person close to the patient. The act of euthanasia should be considered a solemn moment, a rite. Legalizing euthanasia will lead to a change in attitude towards death and, consequently, to religious changes, which may lead to the emergence of a new liturgy accompanying euthanasia.

Wolniewicz called transplants a "new form of cannibalism". More precisely, he considered transplanting an organ removed from a dead body to be morally equivalent to starvation cannibalism (when a dead body is also consumed). Eating a dead human body in order to save life is not morally different from reception of organ removed from a dead body, just as taking a medicine in a pill is not morally different from taking it as an intramuscular injection. Dead human body has traditionally been considered as sacred, and its inviolability has been one of the foundations of civilized life. According to Wolniewicz, the change in relation to a dead human body must lead to the change in relation to a living human – human body begins to be seen in purely utilitarian way (as a raw material). Universal consent to transplants leads to consent to experiments on embryos.

Wolniewicz was strongly opposed to embryo-cloning, which he called "Mengelism". Experimenting on people without their permission had appeared in Josef Megele's research, and later it appeared in medical experiments on embryos. According to Wolniewicz, a human life comes into existence with the formation of one-celled zygote because all physical and spiritual features of human are encoded in zygote's DNA. According to Wolniewicz, the discoveries of modern science are here in line with the Aristotelian theory of entelechy. Embryos contain the potential of humanity with the inner impulse to realize this potential. Therefore, they should be treated as human beings and experimenting on them should be forbidden.

Nevertheless, Wolniewicz supported the so-called "abortion compromise" in Poland. Every abortion kills a person. However, there are occasions when it is ethically acceptable to kill a person (in this case an embryo). Wolniewicz distinguishes two types of abortion: the reckless one and the tragic one. Abortion is acceptable only in tragic situations: when the life or health of mother are at risk, when the pregnancy is a result of rape, and when the fetus is severely handicapped and therefore his life would be a great suffering. All these situations involve a conflict of one humanity with another. Abortion in other situations should be forbidden. The decision to get an abortion should belong only to women, and the legal compromise on abortion protects the sacredness of motherhood, which is violated by both radical Catholics and radical libertarians.

Wolniewicz opposed what he regarded as the "gender ideology" and considered it as a shame that the University of Warsaw as a European educational institution with distinguished scientific traditions accepted gender studies as a discipline.

== Publicist career ==
In 1955, Wolniewicz applied for the membership into the ruling communist Polish United Workers' Party, where he was accepted in 1956. He held the position of the 1st secretary of the PUWP's Higher Education Committee at the Pedagogical University in Gdańsk. Wolniewicz remained a member of the party (despite his aversion to Gierek's government) up to 1981. Until 1998, he would give lectures at the Department of Philosophy and Sociology at the University of Warsaw.

In 1990s, he started collaborating with the Radio Maryja, where often featured as a guest. His controversial views were often regarded as anti-Semitic and Islamophobic.

He stated on TV that gays should not go public and that the Jewish holiday of Sukkot should not be celebrated in public in Poland. In 2008, Wolniewicz addressed a packed crowd at the Basilica of the Sacred Heart of Jesus in Kraków and shouted "The Jews are attacking us! We need to defend ourselves", in an event protesting against the Fear: Anti-Semitism in Poland after Auschwitz book and alongside Jerzy Robert Nowak. The Council of Media Ethics stated that his on-air comments in January 2009 contained anti-semitic views and violated "the basic ethical norms and Polish law". Wolniewicz considered Islam as a harbinger of Asian expansion, and claimed that migration and terror were "weapons" in the hands of Islamists. He called for the sinking of boats with immigrants.

Wolniewicz considered feminism to be against human nature, supported euthanasia, and considered the abolition of capital punishment to be a sign of moral decline in Europe. He spoke against Smolensk air disaster conspiracy theories. Wolniewicz was opposed to genetic engineering and in particular to embryo cloning which he saw as "Mengelism". He objected to organ transplantation viewing it as a form of Cannibalism.

In 2004 he criticized the conditions of accepting Poland into European Union. During the 2005 parliamentary election he unsuccessfully stood as a candidate to Sejm under Janusz Korwin-Mikke Platform in an electoral district outside of Warsaw.

Later into 2007 he got involved in an event initiated by Jerzy Robert Nowak, a professor at the University of Social and Medial Culture against the book Fear: Anti-Semitism in Poland after Auschwitz by Jan Tomasz Gross that describes the Polish-Jewish relations during World War Two. Wolniewicz participated in several meetings where he heavily criticized Gross’s book.

In 2009 he entered The Committee for Defense of the Good Name of Poland and Poles initiated by Jerzy Robert Nowak. From 2014 he prepared lectures on subjects such as Islam, ethics and philosophy for the Rational Voice channel on YouTube.

== Influence ==
Among Wolniewicz's direct students are his doctoral candidates – Zbigniew Musiał, Ulrich Schrade, Beata Witkowska-Maksimczuk; his graduate students – Agnieszka Maria Nogal, Paweł Okołowski, Klaudiusz Suczyński; participants of Wolniewicz's seminars of many years – Jan Zubelewicz, Jędrzej Stanisławek. These people continue and develop Wolniewicz's work and his style of doing philosophy.

Left under a significant influence of Wolniewicz were not only his closest students but also other key Polish philosophers and logicians. Among them Roman Suszko, whose papers on logic were made under a significant influence of the philosophical interpretation of Wittgenstein made by Wolniewicz, especially included in the paper "Things and facts". The fruit of that inspiration is non-Frege logic, one of the key achievements of the post-war Polish logic. One student of Suszko and a colleague of Wolniewicz was a logician Mieczysław Omyła, who continued both logical and ontological work of Suszko and referenced Wolniewicz's situational ontology more than once. Situational ontology also inspires mathematical papers on conditionally distributive lattices by Jan Zygmunt and Jacek Hawranek. Wolniewicz's papers were also met with interest from philosophers and logicians abroad, as evidenced by multiple reviews of his English papers in "Mathematical Review".

He also made many appearances in daily newspapers, radio and TV.

Criticism of Wolniewicz mostly revolves around his social, political and cultural beliefs. It mostly comes from proponents of political and cultural liberalism as well as extreme-left groups. Also faced with criticism in a public discourse was Wolniewicz's expressive manner of speaking (like using such terms as "half-brain", "neo-cannibalism" or "mengelism" when referring to his world-view opponents). Among philosophers, criticism of Wolniewicz, not just in specialized magazines but even daily press, came from, among others, Jacek Jadacki, Jacek Hołówka and Andrzej Bogusławski.

== Medals ==
By a decision of president Aleksander Kwaśniewski on November 11, 1997, „for outstanding contribution to the Polish science”, he was awarded with an Officer's Cross of Polonia Restituta.

== Personal life ==
Born in Toruń, he was the son of Henryk Wolniewicz. He was a self-declared nonbeliever (identifying as "Roman Catholic – nonbeliever"). He made it clear by specifying that he doesn't believe in consciousness carrying on after death. He didn't, however, deny existence of an intelligence supreme to the man.

He died on August 4, 2017, at age 89. On August 9, at the St. Andrzej Bobola church in Warsaw, a funeral service took place in honor of the professor, led by father Andrzej Spławski.

== Selected works ==
in Polish

- Introduction to philosophy: supporting materials, together with Józef Grudzień, Warsaw, National School Publishing Press, 1961.
- Things and facts. Introduction to Ludwik Wittgenstein’s first philosophy (including an excerpt from Plato’s „Theaetetus” in a new translation and with a commentary by Professor Henryk Elzenberg), Warsaw, National Science Publishing, 1968.
- Situational Ontology: basics and applications, Warsaw, National Science Publishing, 1985.
- Philosophy and values: discourses and statements: with excerpts from writings of Tadeusz Kotarbiński, Warsaw, Faculty of Philosophy and Sociology at the University of Warsaw, 1993.
- Philosophy and values 2, Warsaw, Faculty of Philosophy and Sociology at the University of Warsaw, 1998.
- Philosophy and values 3, With an excerpt from „Book of tragedy” by Henryk Elzenberg and his remarks on „Philosophical Investigations” by Wittgenstein, Warsaw, Faculty of Philosophy and Sociology at the University of Warsaw, 2003.
- Xenophobia and community, together with Zbigniew Musiał, Kraków, Arcana, 2003.
- Three trends: rationalism – antirationalism – scientism, together with Zbigniew Musiał and Janusz Skarbek, Warsaw, Faculty of Philosophy and Sociology at the University of Warsaw, 2006.
- On Poland and life: philosophical and political reflection, Komorów, Antyk – Marcin Dybowski, 2011.
- Philosophy and values 4, Warsaw, University of Warsaw, 2016.

in English

- Logic and Metaphysics: Studies in Wittgenstein’s Ontology of Facts, Warsaw, „Sign, Language, Reality”, Polish Semiotic Society, 1999.
