= Basilica of the Sacred Heart of Jesus, Kraków =

Church building in Kraków, Poland

Basilica of the Sacred Heart of Jesus
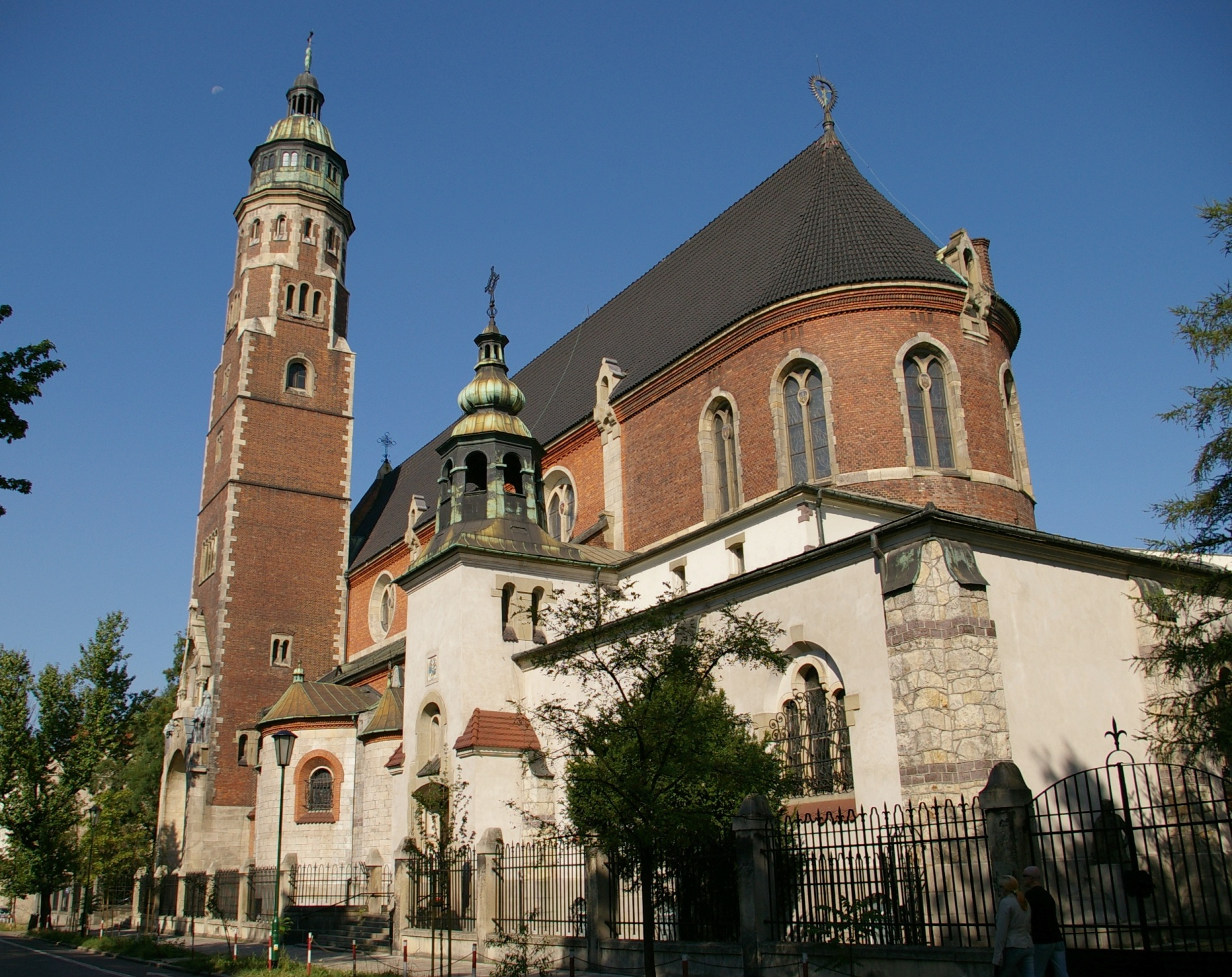
- Basilica of the Sacred Heart of Jesus in Kraków

Religion
- Affiliation: Roman Catholic
- Year consecrated: 1921

Location
- Location: Kraków, Poland
- Interactive map of Basilica of the Sacred Heart of Jesus
- Coordinates: 50°03′43″N 19°56′55″E

Architecture
- Architect: Franciszek Mączyński
- Type: Church
- Style: Modernism
- Groundbreaking: 1909
- Completed: 1921

Specifications
- Capacity: ca. 4 000
- Length: 52 m
- Width: 18 m
- Height (max): 68 m

Website
- Official Website

Basilica of the Sacred Heart of Jesus (Polish: Bazylika Najświętszego Serca Pana Jezusa w Krakowie) is a Roman Catholic church of the Jesuits in Kraków.

== Architecture ==
This monumental Jesuit Church erected from 1909 to 1921 to a design by Franciszek Mączyński. Both its architecture, and the decoration and furnishings, with huge sculptures by Xawery Dunikowski, altar sculptures by Karol Hukan, and Jan Bukowski's murals are among the best examples of modern sacred art in Poland.

In 1960 it received the rank of a lesser basilica; in 1966 it was classified as a historical monument. Its tower, 68 meters (223 ft) high, is one of the tallest in Kraków.

== See also ==
- List of Jesuit sites
- The Lesser Polish Way
