= Claire Wolniewicz =

French journalist and writer

Claire Wolniewicz (born 1966) is a French journalist and writer, of Polish origin. She studied law and worked for a while in the field of intellectual property. She works as a freelance journalist, and has written TV scripts, short stories and novels. Her debut novel Ubiquité won the 2006 Prix des Lycéens Librecourt.

== Selected works ==
- Sainte Rita: Patronne des causes désespérées (nouvelles), Bordeaux, Finitude, 2003.
- Ubiquité (roman), Paris, éd. Viviane Hamy, 2005. Prix des Lycéens Librecourt 2006.
- Le Temps d'une chute, Paris, éd. Viviane Hamy, 2007. Prix du roman d'avril des Espaces culturels E. Leclerc et Télé 7 Jours.
- Terre légère, Paris, éd. Viviane Hamy, 2009.
- La dame à la larme, Paris, éd. Viviane Hamy, 2011.
