= Etyka =

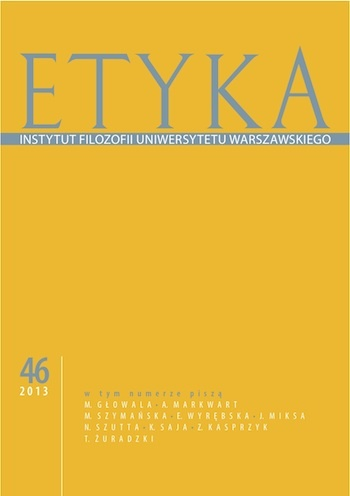
- Etyka Journal Cover (Volume 46)
- Discipline: Moral philosophy
- Language: Polish
- Edited by: Paweł Łuków

Publication details
- History: 1966-present
- Publisher: Faculty of Philosophy, University of Warsaw (Poland)
- Frequency: Biannually
- Open access: Yes
- License: Creative Commons Attribution No Derivatives 4.0 International (CC BY-ND)

Standard abbreviations
- ISO 4: Etyka

Indexing
- ISSN: 0014-2263 (print); 2392-1161 (web)
- OCLC no.: 231043299

Links
- Journal homepage; Current Issue

Etyka (Polish for "ethics") is a peer-reviewed academic journal covering moral philosophy, published by the Institute of Philosophy (University of Warsaw). It was established in 1966, but publication was interrupted between 1990 and 1993. Etyka publishes articles on ethics, applied ethics, history of ethics, psychology and sociology of morality, ethical education, and texts concerning current ethical controversies. Editors-in-chief have been Marek Fritzhand (1966-1967), Henryk Jankowski (1968-1992), and Barbara Skarga (1993-2006). Since 2006, the editor-in-chief is Paweł Łuków.
