= Das Kapital =

Three-volume work by Karl Marx, 1867–1894

Capital
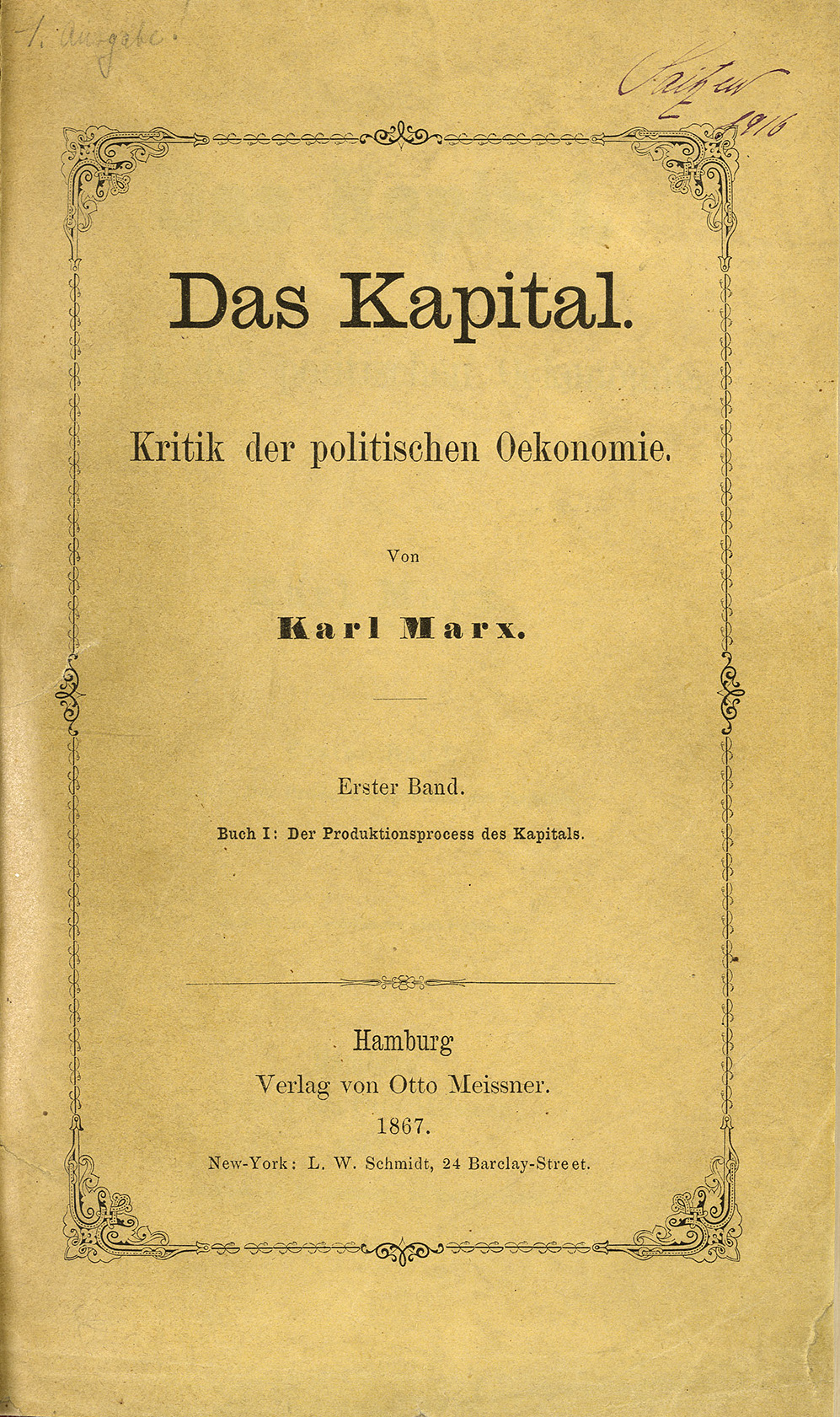
- Title page of the first German edition of Volume I (1867)
- Author: Karl Marx
- Original title: Das Kapital. Kritik der politischen Ökonomie
- Language: German
- Subjects: Critique of political economy; Capitalism
- Published: 1867; 1885; 1894
- Publisher: Otto Meissner
- Publication place: Hamburg, Germany
- English publication date: 1887; 1907; 1909
- Text: Capital at Wikisource
- Volumes II and III were edited and published posthumously by Friedrich Engels.

Capital: A Critique of Political Economy (German: Das Kapital. Kritik der politischen Ökonomie), also known as Das Kapital (German: [das kapiˈtaːl]), is a foundational text in Marxist theory by Karl Marx. His magnum opus, the work is a critical analysis of political economy, meant to reveal the economic patterns underpinning the capitalist mode of production. Capital is divided into three volumes, of which only the first was published during Marx's lifetime, in 1867; the others were completed from his manuscripts and published by his collaborator Friedrich Engels in 1885 and 1894.

The central argument of Capital is that the motivating force of capitalism is in the exploitation of labour, whose unpaid work is the ultimate source of surplus value and profit. Beginning with an analysis of the commodity, Marx argues that the capitalist mode of production is a historically specific system where social relations are mediated by commodity exchange. He posits a labour theory of value, contending that the economic value of a commodity is determined by the socially necessary labour time required for its production. Under this system, the worker's capacity to labour (their labour power) is sold as a commodity, but its use-value—the ability to create new value—is greater than its exchange-value (the wage), allowing the capitalist to extract surplus value. This process drives capital accumulation, which in turn fosters technological change, the creation of a reserve army of labour, and a long-term tendency of the rate of profit to fall, leading to economic crises and intensifying class conflict.

In developing his critique, Marx synthesised and critiqued three main intellectual traditions: the classical political economy of thinkers like Adam Smith and David Ricardo, the German idealist philosophy of Georg Wilhelm Friedrich Hegel, and French socialist thought. His dialectical method aimed to uncover the internal contradictions and historical transience of capitalism. A key theme is commodity fetishism, the process by which the social relations of production are obscured and appear as objective, natural relations between things. Volume I focuses on the production process, Volume II on the circulation of capital, and Volume III on the process as a whole, examining the distribution of surplus value into profit, interest, and rent.

Capital is one of the most influential works of social science ever written. Its analysis has been foundational to the international labour movement, socialist and communist political parties, and a wide range of academic disciplines, including sociology, political science, and philosophy. It remains central to Marxian economics and has been highly influential in Western Marxism, critical theory, and cultural studies. The work has been subject to extensive debate and criticism since its publication, particularly concerning its labour theory of value, its predictions about the future of capitalism, and its association with 20th-century communist states.

== Background and influences ==
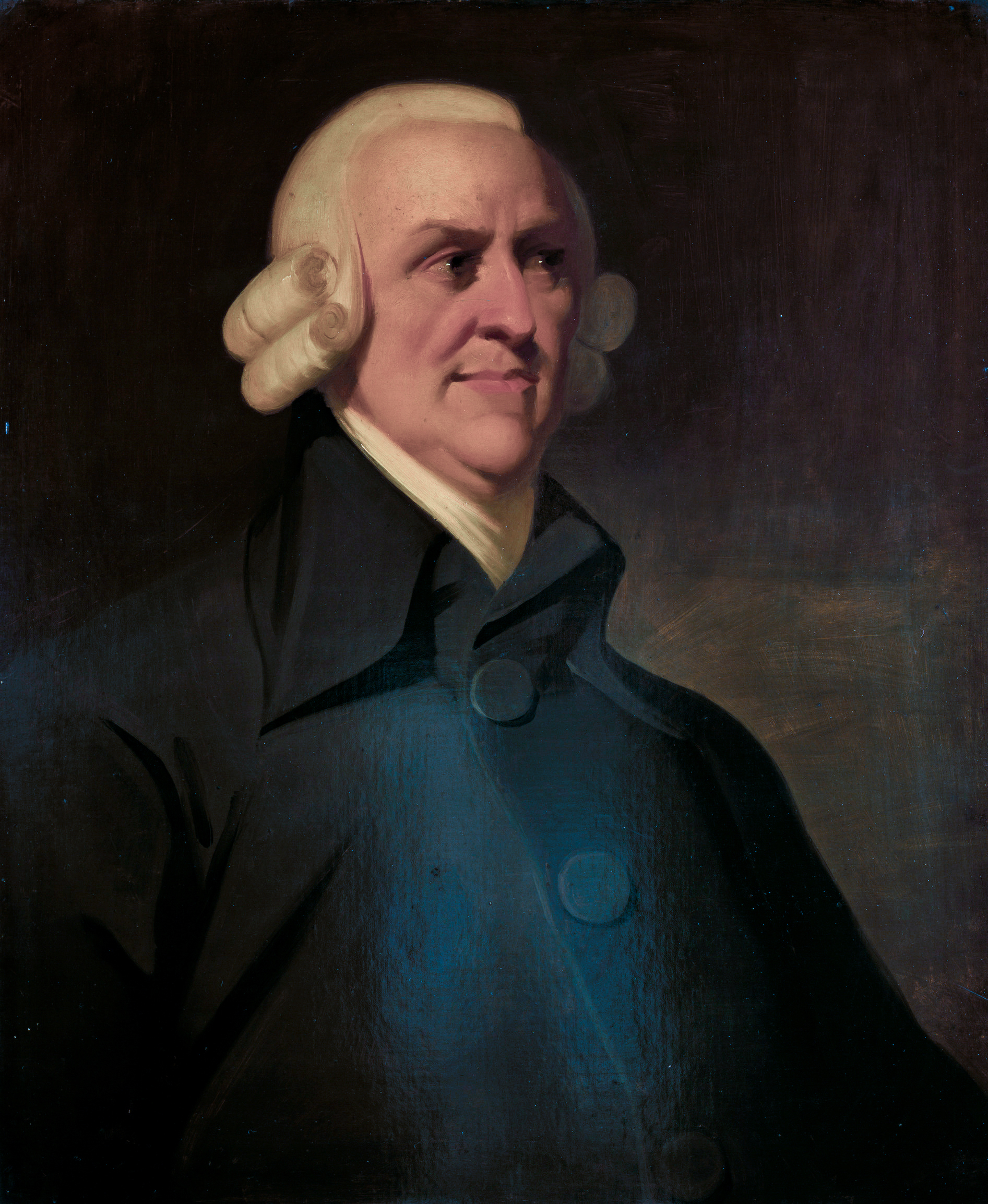
Adam Smith

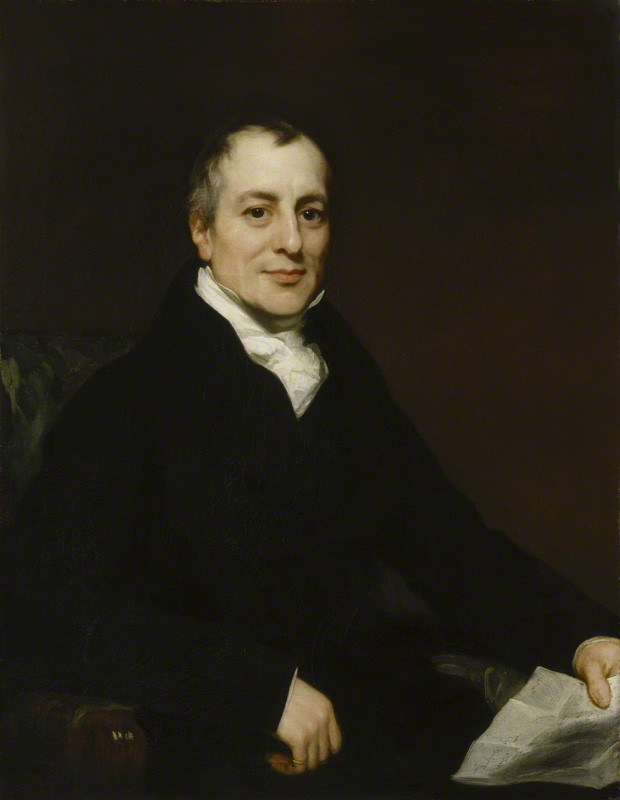
David Ricardo

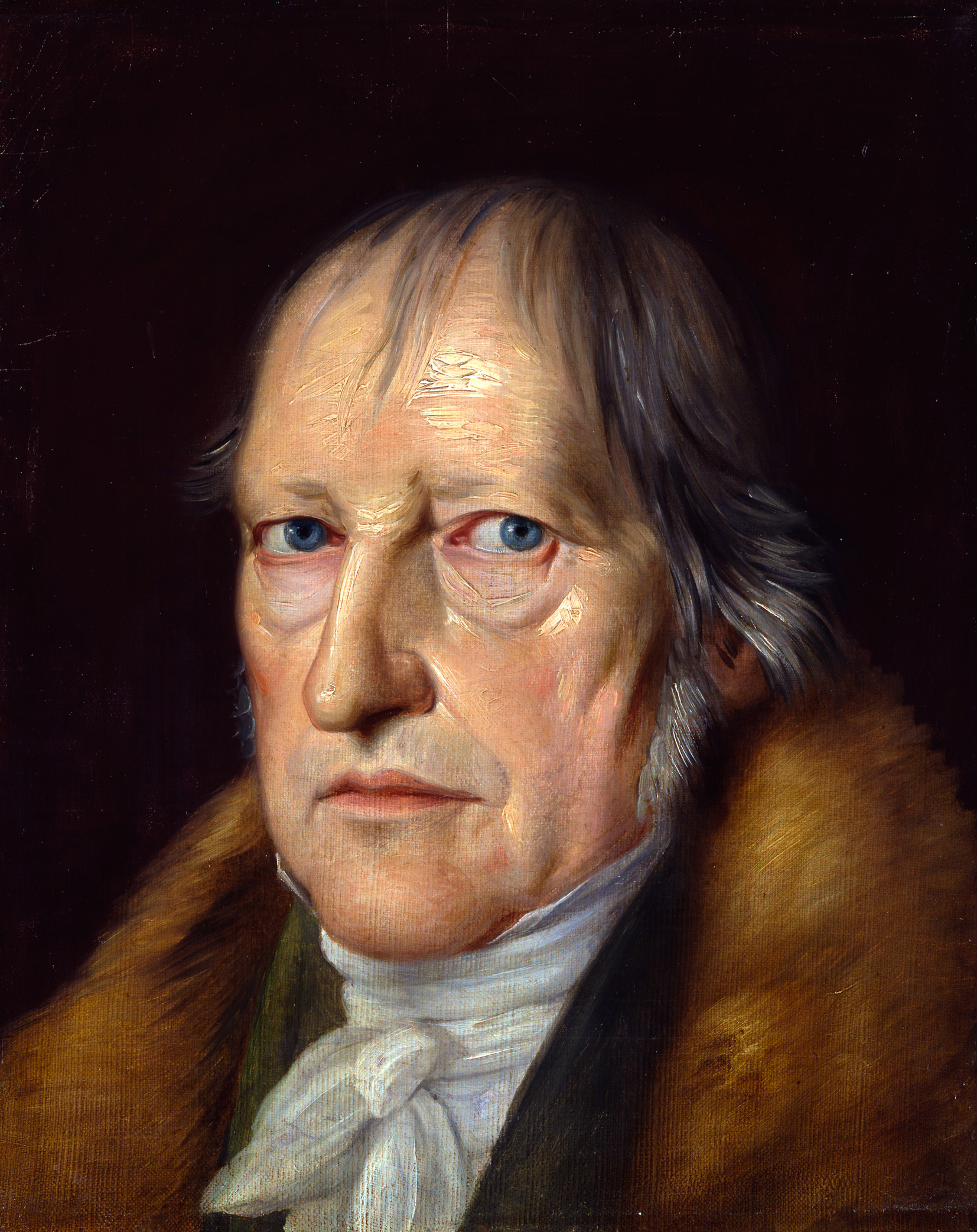
Georg Wilhelm Friedrich Hegel

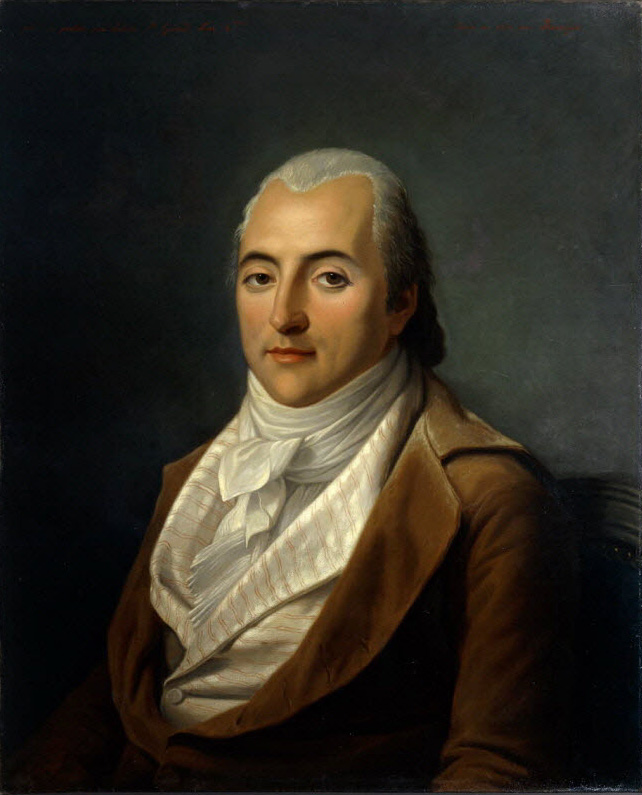
Henri de Saint-Simon

Karl Marx's Capital emerged from his lifelong project of developing a comprehensive "critique of political economy". His work was a synthesis and critical engagement with three major intellectual and political traditions: classical political economy, German critical philosophy, and utopian socialism.

Marx meticulously studied classical political economists from the seventeenth to the mid-nineteenth century. This included British thinkers like William Petty, John Locke, Thomas Hobbes, David Hume, James Steuart, Adam Smith, Thomas Malthus, and David Ricardo. He also engaged with the French tradition of Physiocrats like François Quesnay and Anne Robert Jacques Turgot, and later economists such as Jean Charles Léonard de Sismondi and Jean-Baptiste Say. His extensive notes on these thinkers, published as Theories of Surplus Value, demonstrate his method of deconstructing their arguments, accepting certain insights while identifying gaps and contradictions to transform their theories. His critique aimed not just at specific theories but at the categorical presuppositions of the entire field, challenging the way political economy posed its questions and what it accepted as self-evident. Marx distinguished his approach from classical political economy specifically regarding the treatment of labour; whereas Ricardo viewed labour transhistorically as the source of wealth, Marx analysed labour as a historically specific social form ("abstract labour") unique to capitalism.

Philosophical reflection, originating with Greek thought (Marx wrote his dissertation on Epicurus and was familiar with Aristotle), formed another crucial foundation. He was thoroughly trained in the German philosophical tradition, particularly the works of Baruch Spinoza, Gottfried Wilhelm Leibniz, Immanuel Kant, and, most significantly, Georg Wilhelm Friedrich Hegel. The critical climate generated by the Young Hegelians in the 1830s and 1840s, and Marx's engagement with thinkers like Ludwig Feuerbach, profoundly influenced his early development. From Hegel, Marx adopted and transformed the dialectic, a method for understanding processes of motion, change, and contradiction. Influenced by Feuerbach's materialism, he broke with Hegelian idealism, arguing that social consciousness is determined by material conditions, not the other way around. This synthesis of dialectics with a materialist understanding of history became a cornerstone of his method. Some interpretations suggest that Marx's mature critique of Hegel was not a simple materialist inversion, but an attempt to show that the "rational core" of Hegel's idealist dialectic—a self-moving "Subject" that grounds itself—is actually the alienated social structure of capital itself.

The third major influence was utopian socialism, primarily French in Marx's time, though with English precursors like Thomas More and Robert Owen. Thinkers such as Henri de Saint-Simon, Charles Fourier, and Pierre-Joseph Proudhon, as well as figures like Étienne Cabet and Louis Auguste Blanqui, contributed to a vibrant utopian discourse in the 1830s and 1840s. Marx was familiar with this tradition, particularly during his time in Paris in 1843–1844. While he sought to distance himself from what he saw as the shallow utopianism that failed to provide a practical path to a new society, he often proceeded in his arguments by way of a critical negation of their ideas, particularly those of Fourier and Proudhon. His aim was to convert what he considered a rather superficial utopian socialism into a "scientific socialism", by interrogating classical political economy with the tools of German critical philosophy, all applied to illuminate the French utopian impulse.

== Marx's aims and method ==
Karl Marx in 1875. Capital was the culmination of his lifelong critique of political economy.

Marx's fundamental aim in Capital was to "lay bare the economic law of motion of modern society". He sought to uncover the specific historical laws governing the origins, development, and decline of the capitalist mode of production, rather than searching for eternal or universal economic laws applicable to all societies. For Marx, an essential thesis of Capital is that such universal laws do not exist; each specific social form of economic organisation has its own specific economic laws. This was not merely an academic exercise; his work was driven by a commitment to critical theory and the revolutionary transformation of society. He aimed to provide a "rock-like foundation of scientific truth" for the workers' movement by revealing the inherent contradictions and exploitative nature of capitalism. In this vein, some interpretations read Capital not merely as a scientific analysis but as a political weapon designed to arm workers by revealing the dynamics of class struggle from a working-class perspective, helping to win them over to the ideas of internationalism and labour activism.

Diagram depicting Marx's method of analytical inquiry and systematic-dialectical presentation, as used in Capital

Marx's method of presentation in Capital, as he explained in the postface to the second German edition, differed from his method of inquiry. The inquiry involved appropriating the material in detail, analysing its different forms of development, and tracking down their inner connections. Only after this work was done could the "real movement be appropriately presented". This process corresponds to what he termed the "descending path", moving from the confused appearances of economic life to uncover the essence at its deepest layer. The presentation, conversely, follows an "ascending path", starting from the most abstract essence to progressively clarify phenomenal forms and arrive back at the concrete totality. Consequently, Capital begins by laying out foundational concepts—such as the commodity, value, and money—in a somewhat a priori fashion in the opening chapters, making the initial reading particularly arduous. Marx's argument unfolds not in a linear, brick-by-brick manner, but more like an "onion", starting from surface appearances, moving to a conceptual core, and then growing outward again, with concepts becoming richer and more meaningful as the analysis progresses.

A key aspect of Marx's method is the use of abstraction. Recognising that social science cannot conduct controlled experiments in a laboratory, Marx employed the "power of abstraction" to isolate and analyse the fundamental dynamics of capitalism. His analysis focuses on the capitalist mode of production in its "pure" form, often abstracting from historical contingencies or specific empirical variations to reveal underlying structures and tendencies.

The dialectical method is central to Marx's approach, though he never wrote a separate treatise on it. Derived from Hegel but "turned right side up again" in a materialist framework, Marx's dialectic views economic phenomena not in isolation but in their inner connection as an "integrated totality, structured around, and by, a basic predominant mode of production". It aims to understand "every historically developed form as being in a fluid state, in motion", grasping the "transient aspect" of a society by uncovering the internal contradictions that drive its development and eventual disappearance. A central dialectical theme is the distinction between a phenomenon's essence (or content) and its appearance (or form), such as the way the wage conceals the underlying exploitation of labour. Rather than a closed system of thesis, antithesis, and synthesis, Marx's dialectic is an "expansionary logic", where contradictions are internalised and lead to further development of the argument, revealing a "perpetual expansion of the contradictions". The dialectic in Capital is also interpreted by some as a critique of the "transhistorical" view of history; rather than positing a universal logic of history, Marx identifies a specific directional dynamic inherent only to the capitalist social formation, driven by its internal contradictions.

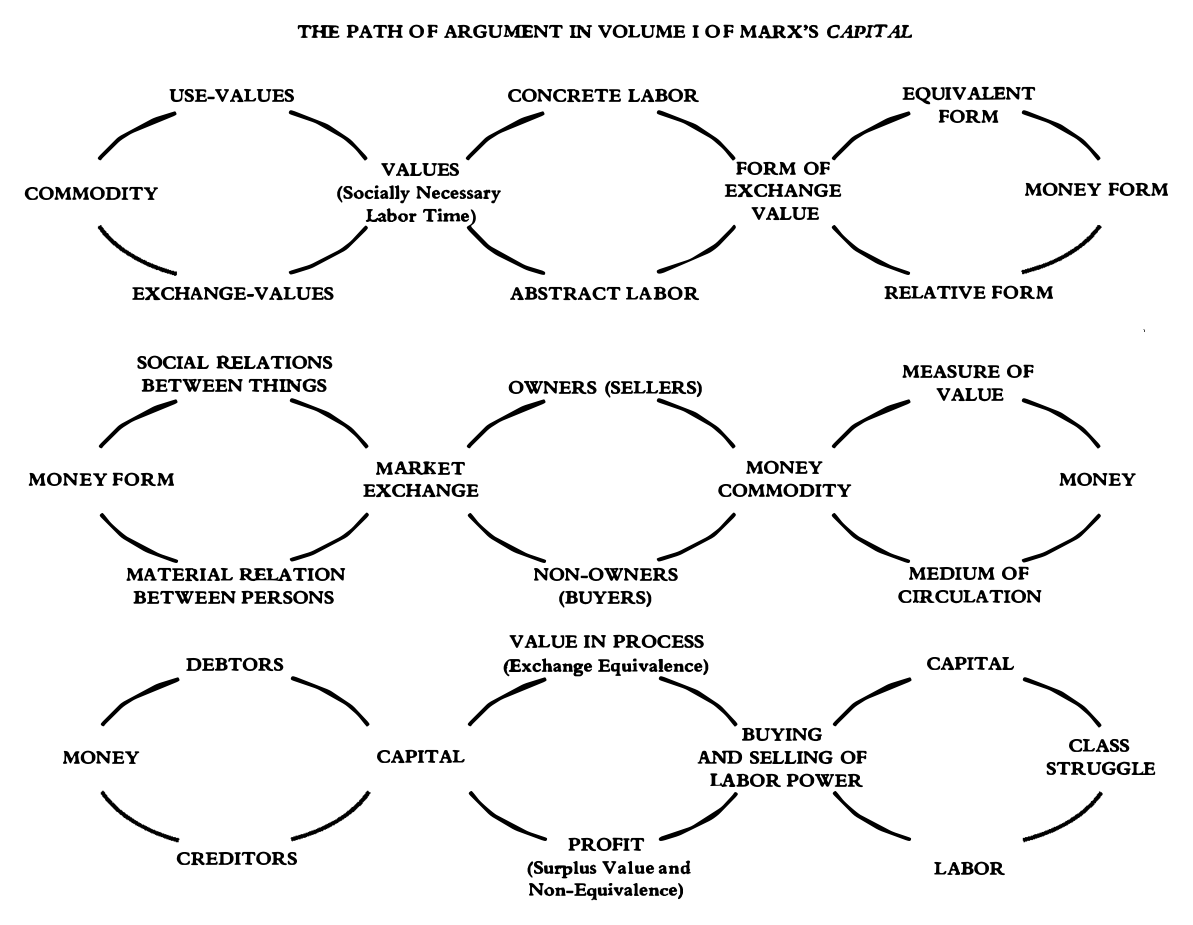
Dialectical unfolding of core categories in Capital, Volume I, as charted by David Harvey. Marx's method involves revealing internal contradictions that propel the argument forward.

The starting point of Capital with the commodity appears somewhat arbitrary to many readers. Marx had struggled for decades with where to begin his critique. His "method of descent"—proceeding from immediate reality to deeper, fundamental concepts—led him to the commodity as the elementary form of wealth in capitalist societies, containing in embryonic form all the system's inner contradictions. From this starting point, which is itself a theoretical construct derived from abstraction rather than a simple empirical given, Marx unfolds his analysis, examining the dual character of the commodity (use-value and exchange-value), which leads to the concept of value, and then to money as the necessary form of appearance of value. This progression through dualities and their (often contradictory) unities is characteristic of his dialectical presentation. The method is one of immanent critique, analysing the categories of the society "in their own terms" to reveal their internal inconsistencies and the possibility of their historical negation.

Marx's critique of political economy is not simply a refutation of previous theories but a critique of the very categories and presuppositions of bourgeois economic thought. He challenges the "naturalisation" and "reification" of social relations, whereby historically specific capitalist relations are presented as eternal and natural properties of things. A central example is the fetishism of commodities, where the social relations between producers appear as relations between things (the products of their labour), obscuring the underlying social reality. This "enchanted, distorted and upside-down world" is not a subjective illusion but an objective appearance that arises from the specific social form of labour in a commodity-producing society. Marx aims to penetrate this "religion of everyday life" that underpins both everyday consciousness and the categories of political economy.

== Writing process ==
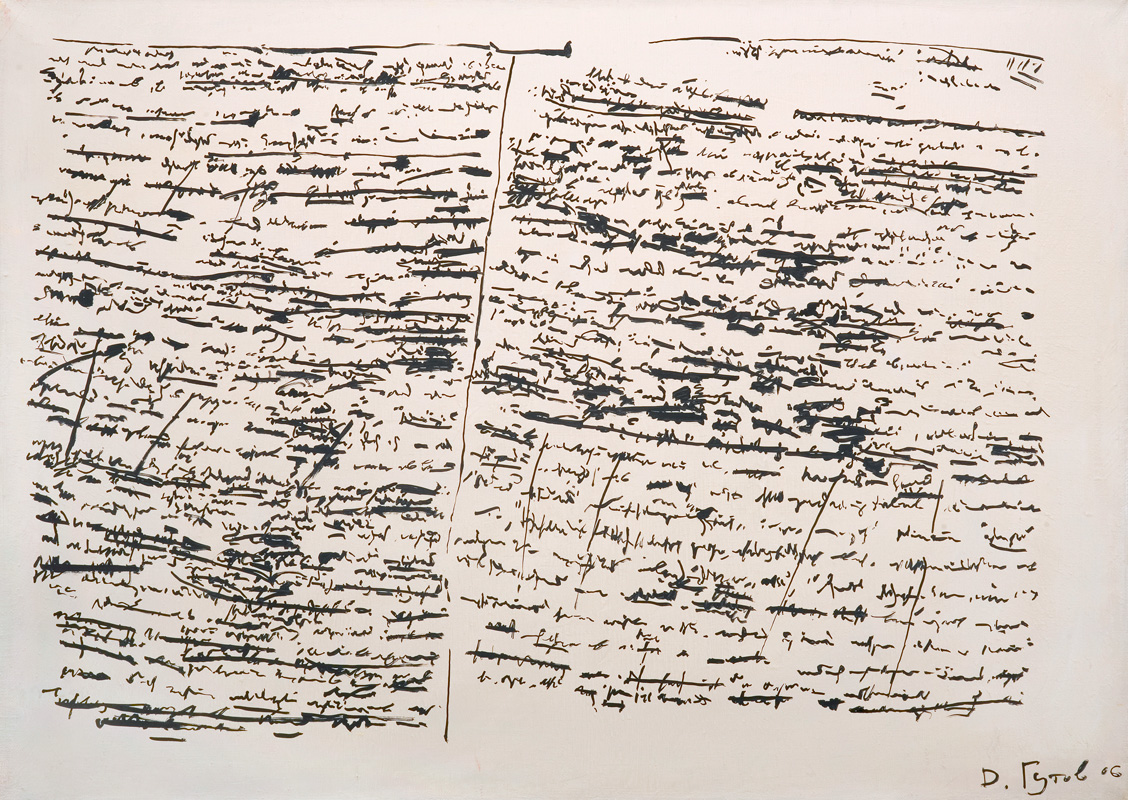
Page from Marx's Economic and Philosophic Manuscripts of 1844

The writing of Capital was a long and arduous process, spanning several decades. Marx began intensive economic studies in the 1840s, and after being interrupted by his participation in the revolutions of 1848 and subsequent exile, resumed his systematic research in London in 1850. His Economic and Philosophic Manuscripts of 1844 represent an early, rough draft of ideas that would eventually mature into Capital. According to some scholars, Capital can be seen as the logical culmination of the theory of alienation (or dehumanisation) that Marx first explored in these early manuscripts; for example, Leszek Kołakowski argued that one of Marx's great achievements was to express his theory of alienation, derived from Hegel and the Young Hegelians, in the conceptual categories he took over and modified from Ricardo. The precise nature of Marx's break from Hegelian philosophy and the scientific status of his new method would become a central point of contention among 20th-century Marxists, exemplified by Louis Althusser's influential theory of an "epistemological break" separating the mature Marx of Capital from his earlier works.

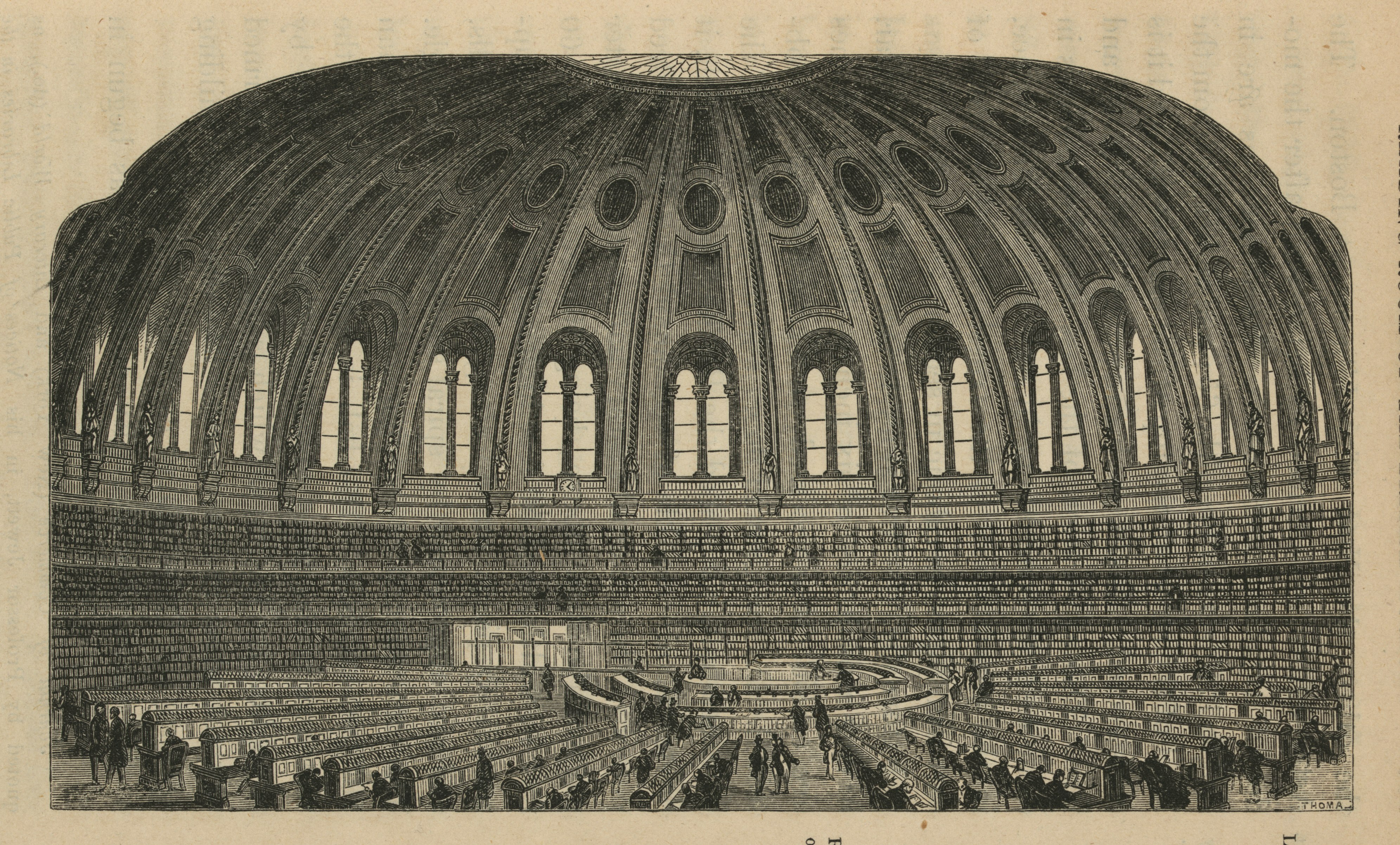
The Reading Room of the British Library in London (now located in the British Museum), where Marx conducted much of the research for Capital.

Throughout the 1850s and 1860s, Marx filled numerous notebooks with research, excerpts from economic texts, and his own developing theories. The Grundrisse, a lengthy manuscript written in 1857–1858, represents a significant milestone in the development of Capital, containing extensive discussions on alienation, dialectics, and the theory of value. In contrast to the polished and perfected final version, the Grundrisse reveals the "chisel marks" of Marx's method, with a terminological ambiguity that would later be resolved; for example, "labour" is often used generically to refer to both the worker's capacity to labour and the activity of labour itself, a distinction later clarified with the precise concept of "labour-power". A preliminary version, A Contribution to the Critique of Political Economy, was published in 1859 but covered only a fraction of Marx's planned work and received little attention. Marx continued to revise and expand his manuscript, driven by new research and his engagement with events like the American Civil War and the rise of the International Working Men's Association (First International), of which he became a leading figure. The intellectual project of writing Capital and the political work of the International were "intertwined"; Marx saw the book as a vital tool for the workers' movement and was, in turn, influenced by the practical struggles of the workers he engaged with.

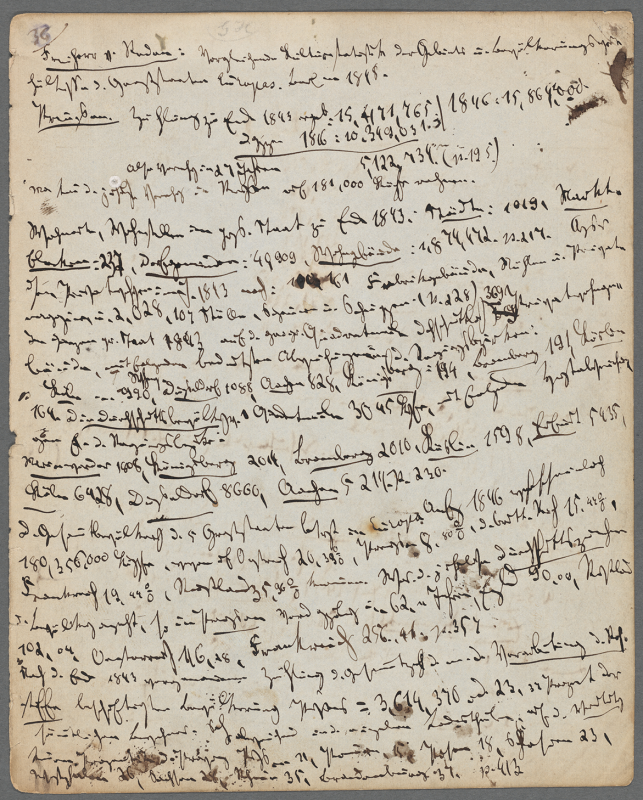
Page from Marx's manuscript notes for Capital, c. 1860

Marx's perfectionism and his tendency to get sidetracked by polemics and contemporary political events significantly delayed the book's completion. He often complained of ill health, particularly liver problems and carbuncles, which he attributed to the stress of his work and dire financial circumstances. His friend and collaborator Friedrich Engels provided crucial financial and intellectual support throughout this period, frequently urging Marx to complete the work. In February 1867, shortly before delivering the first volume to the printers, Marx urged Engels to read Honoré de Balzac's The Unknown Masterpiece. He saw a parallel between the story's protagonist, a painter who endlessly reworks his masterpiece to the point where nothing remains, and his own protracted struggle with Capital. This anecdote reveals Marx's anxieties about the intelligibility and reception of his complex work, as well as his self-perception as a creative artist engaged in a monumental task.

Marx's initial plan for Capital, drawn up in 1857, was much broader than the published volumes. It envisioned six books: on capital, landed property, wage-labour, the state, international trade, and the world market and crises. This plan was revised several times. The formerly central concept of "capital in general"—which abstracted from the competition between many capitals—was abandoned after 1863, leading to a new structure for the work. By 1865–66, the structure had been modified to a four-volume work on capital, with the first three volumes corresponding to the ones published, and the fourth volume dedicated to the history of economic theory. Topics such as wage-labour and landed property were integrated into Volume I and Volume III (analysis of ground rent), respectively. While the volumes of Capital are often considered Marx's complete work, they only correspond to the first book of his scrapped six-book plan. The conceptual apparatus he developed, particularly in its opening chapters, was intended to lay the foundation for a much broader analysis of topics such as the state, the world market, and crises, which never came to fruition.

== Synopsis ==
=== Volume I: The Process of Production of Capital ===
Volume I, published in 1867, is Marx's most extensive and historically detailed work, focusing on the immediate process of production of capital. It lays out the foundational categories of his critique of political economy and traces the ways in which surplus value is generated through the exploitation of labour.

==== Part I: Commodities and Money ====
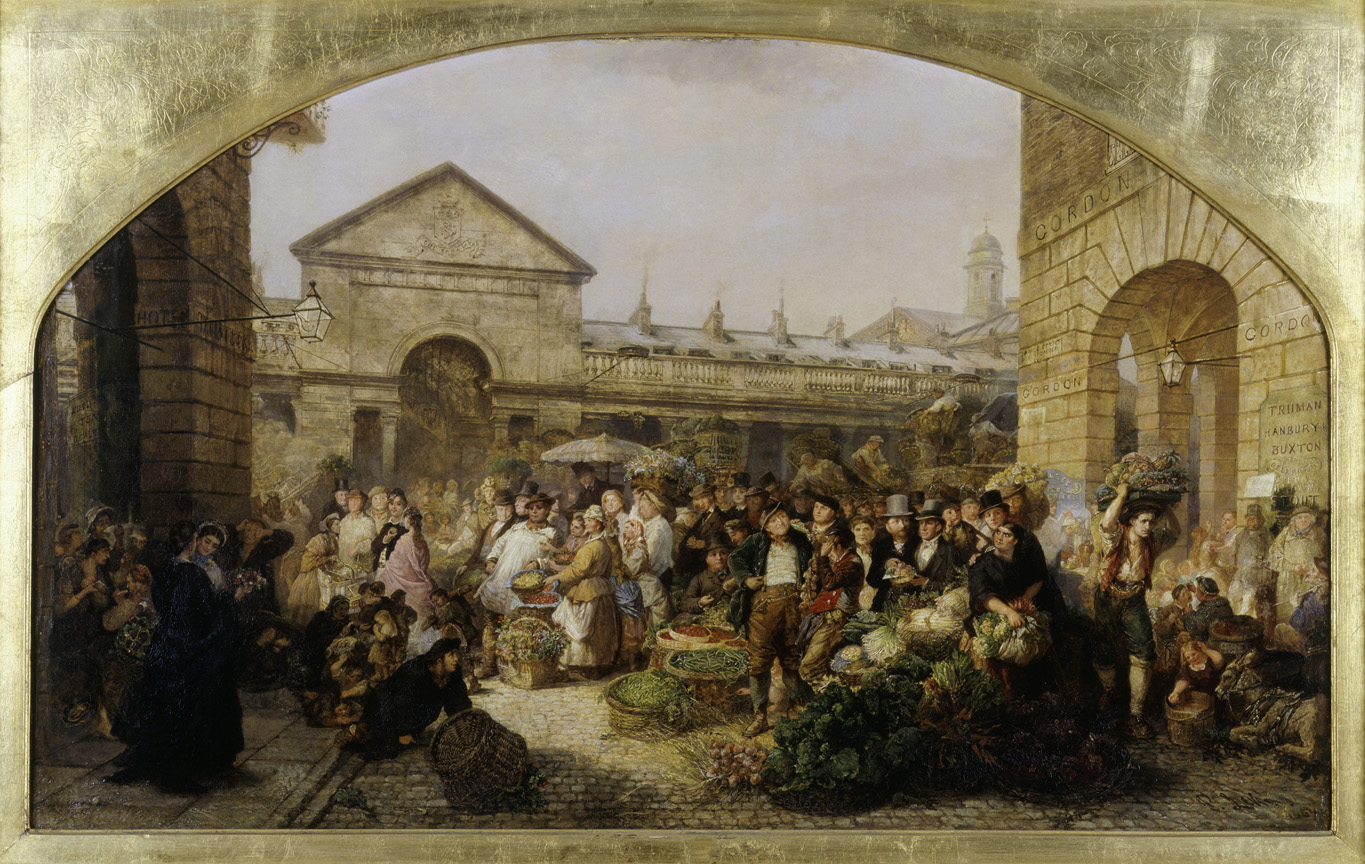
Depiction of Covent Garden Market in London by Phoebus Levin, 1864. Marx analysed the commodity as the elementary form of wealth in capitalist societies, where myriad goods are exchanged in bustling marketplaces.

Marx begins his analysis with the commodity as the elementary form of wealth in capitalist societies, where wealth "appears as" an "immense collection of commodities". He establishes its dual character: it has a "use-value", satisfying some human want or need, and an "exchange-value", the quantitative proportion in which it exchanges for other commodities. This commensurability in exchange, Marx argues, points to an underlying common element: "value".

The "substance" of value is congealed "human labour in the abstract", a "social substance" that commodities possess not individually but "communally" through their relationship in exchange. Crucial to Marx's theory is the distinction between "concrete labour" (specific purposeful activities like weaving or tailoring) and "abstract labour" (labour as a general social mediation). Abstract labour is not a physiological expenditure but a historically specific social category unique to capitalism, where labour serves as the means by which individuals acquire the products of others. The magnitude of value is determined by "socially necessary labour time" – the average time required to produce a commodity under normal conditions of production with the average degree of skill and intensity prevalent in that society. For a commodity to have value, its labour must be useful, meaning it must produce a use-value that someone wants, needs, or desires.

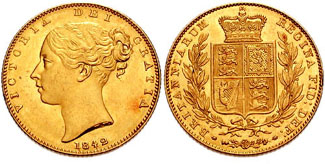
British gold sovereign featuring Queen Victoria, 1842. Marx discussed gold as the primary money commodity in his time, serving as a universal equivalent and measure of value.

The exchange process itself necessitates a universal equivalent, a "money commodity" (historically gold and silver). Marx traces the conceptual development of the form of value from the simple or accidental form, through the expanded and general forms, to the money form, arguing that this development is not historical but logical. Money serves as a measure of value (allowing commodities to express their values as price) and as a medium of circulation (facilitating the exchange of commodities, C-M-C). These two functions are contradictory: as a measure of value, money should be stable (like gold), but as a means of circulation, it needs to be efficient and adaptable, leading to the use of tokens and credit money. The circulation of commodities C-M-C (selling in order to buy) contains the formal possibility of crises, as the sale (C-M) and the purchase (M-C) are separated in time and space, meaning there is no automatic guarantee that a sale will be followed by a purchase. Money also functions as a hoard (a store of value), as a means of payment (for settling debts, introducing the creditor-debtor relation), and as "world money" in international trade.

This section introduces the concept of the "fetishism of commodities", where the social relations between producers "assume... the fantastic form of a relation between things". This "value-objectivity", which Marx describes as "spectral" or "phantom-like", is a "socio-natural property" that appears to belong to commodities themselves but is in fact the result of a specific social structure. The market system and money disguise these real social relations, making them appear as objective properties of the commodities.

==== Part II: The Transformation of Money into Capital ====
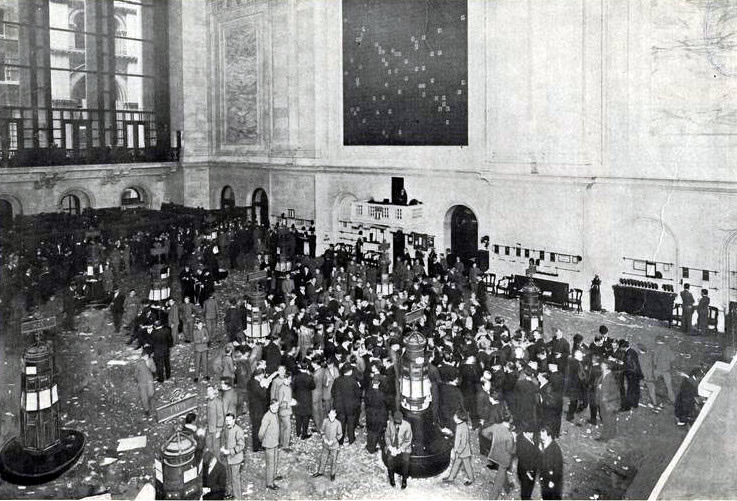
The floor of the New York Stock Exchange in 1908. The circulation M-C-M' (buying in order to sell dearer) is the general formula for capital, a process central to financial markets.

Marx then examines how money is transformed into capital. The simple circulation of commodities is C-M-C (selling in order to buy another commodity of equivalent value). Capital, however, circulates as M-C-M' (buying in order to sell dearer), where M' is M + ΔM, the increment ΔM being "surplus value". Capital is thus defined not as a thing (like money or machines) but as a process: "value in motion", specifically "self-valorising value" which becomes an "automatic subject". The capitalist, as the "conscious bearer" of this movement, is driven by the "unceasing movement of profit-making".

Marx argues that surplus value cannot arise from the sphere of circulation if equivalents are exchanged (M-C and C-M both adhering to value equivalence). While individual capitalists might cheat by buying cheap or selling dear, this merely redistributes existing value. The problem is to explain how the capitalist class as a whole can extract surplus value while adhering to the laws of commodity exchange. The solution lies in finding a unique commodity whose use-value is itself a source of more value than it costs. This commodity is "labour power", the capacity to labour. For labour-power to be available as a commodity, two conditions must be met: the labourer must be a "free proprietor" of their labour-power, able to sell it for a definite period; and the labourer must be "free" in the double sense of not possessing the means of production, thus having no other commodity to sell and being compelled to sell their labour-power to survive. This "double freedom" is the result of a historical process of "primitive accumulation" which divorces the producers from the means of production.

The value of labour-power is determined, like that of any other commodity, by the labour-time necessary for its reproduction. This includes the means of subsistence required to maintain the labourer in their normal state as a working individual and to reproduce the working class. Marx emphasises that this value contains a "historical and moral element", varying according to the level of civilisation, the habits and expectations of the working class, and the outcomes of class struggle. The capitalist purchases labour-power at its value, and then consumes its use-value in the labour process. The "secret of profit-making" is that the value created by the labourer in the production process is greater than the value of their own labour-power.

==== Part III: The Production of Absolute Surplus-Value ====
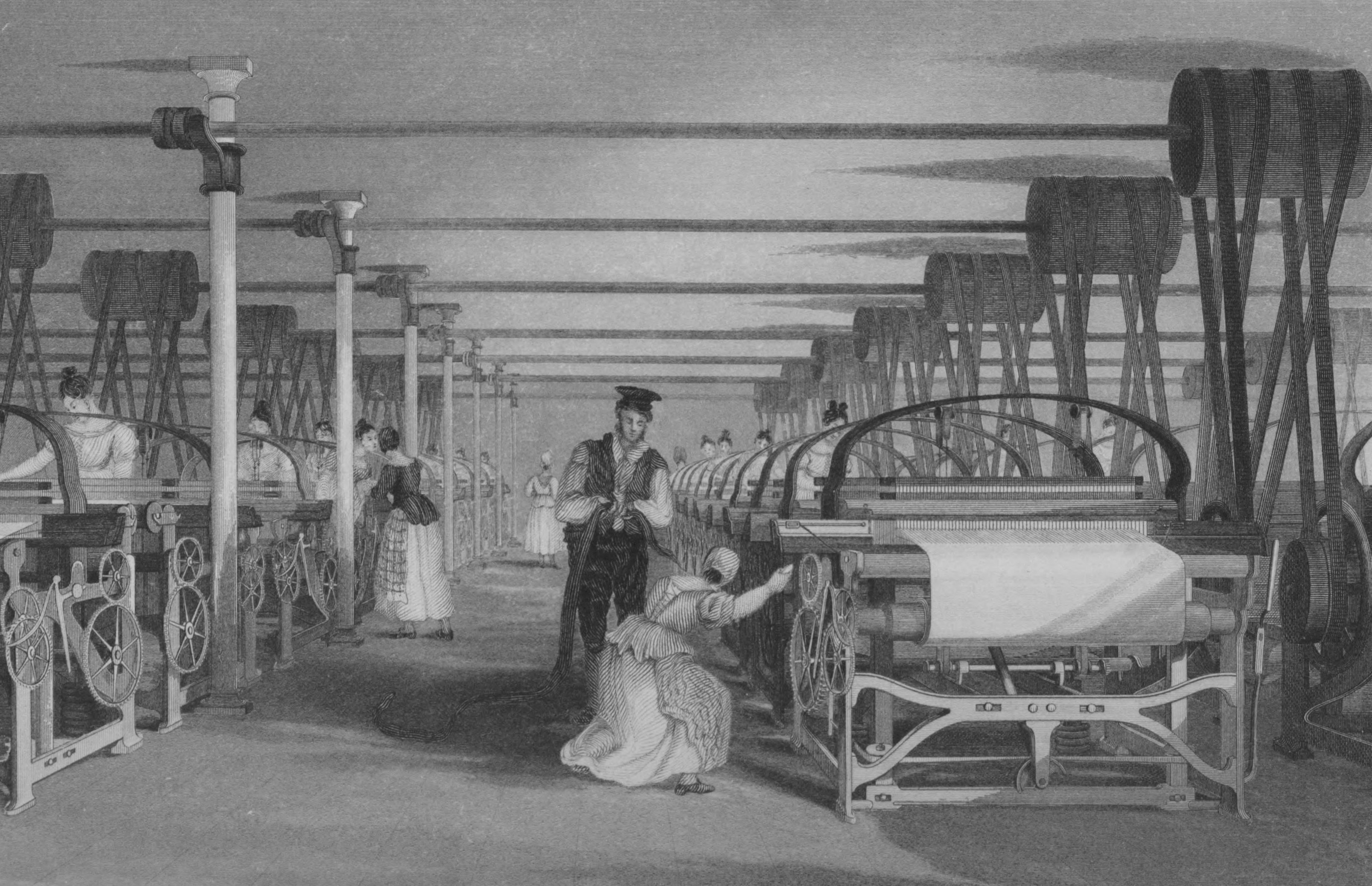
Depiction of power loom weaving in a British cotton mill, 1835. The textile industry, a key focus for Marx, exemplified the capitalist labour process where absolute surplus-value was extracted by prolonging the working day.

Marx moves from the sphere of circulation ("a very Eden of the innate rights of man") into the "hidden abode of production". The capitalist production process is a unity of the "labour process" (the purposeful activity of producing use-values) and the "valorisation process" (the process of creating value and surplus-value). In the labour process, the capitalist controls the work and owns the product. This generates a "rebellious attitude" in the worker, who is now subordinated to an external purpose.

Capital advanced is divided into "constant capital" (c) – the value of the means of production (raw materials, auxiliary materials, and instruments of labour) – and "variable capital" (v) – the value laid out in purchasing labour-power. Constant capital merely transfers its existing value to the new product, while variable capital, through the expenditure of living labour, creates new value. The new value created is greater than the value of the variable capital (v); this excess is surplus value (s). The total value of the commodity is thus c + v + s. The "rate of surplus value" (s/v) is the measure of the exploitation of labour-power. It expresses the ratio of "surplus labour-time" (the time the worker labours beyond what is necessary to reproduce the value of their labour-power) to "necessary labour-time" (the time required to reproduce the value of labour-power).

The working day is the site of a struggle between the capitalist class (seeking to maximise its length) and the working class (seeking to limit it). Capital, as "dead labour which, vampire-like, lives only by sucking living labour", has an inherent drive to extend the working day beyond its physical and social limits. This struggle is not resolvable by appeals to the "rights" of commodity exchange, as both capitalist and worker can claim their rights as buyer and seller respectively. "Between equal rights, force decides", leading to a historical struggle, exemplified by the fight for the Factory Acts in Britain. Marx details the often brutal conditions and excessive hours imposed on workers, particularly women and children, in various industries. The establishment of a "normal working day" is thus a product of protracted class struggle and state intervention, influenced by factors such as the need for a healthy workforce and military conscripts.

"Absolute surplus-value" is produced by prolonging the working day, thus extending surplus labour-time, given a constant necessary labour-time. The "mass of surplus-value" is the rate of surplus-value multiplied by the number of labourers employed.

==== Part IV: The Production of Relative Surplus-Value ====
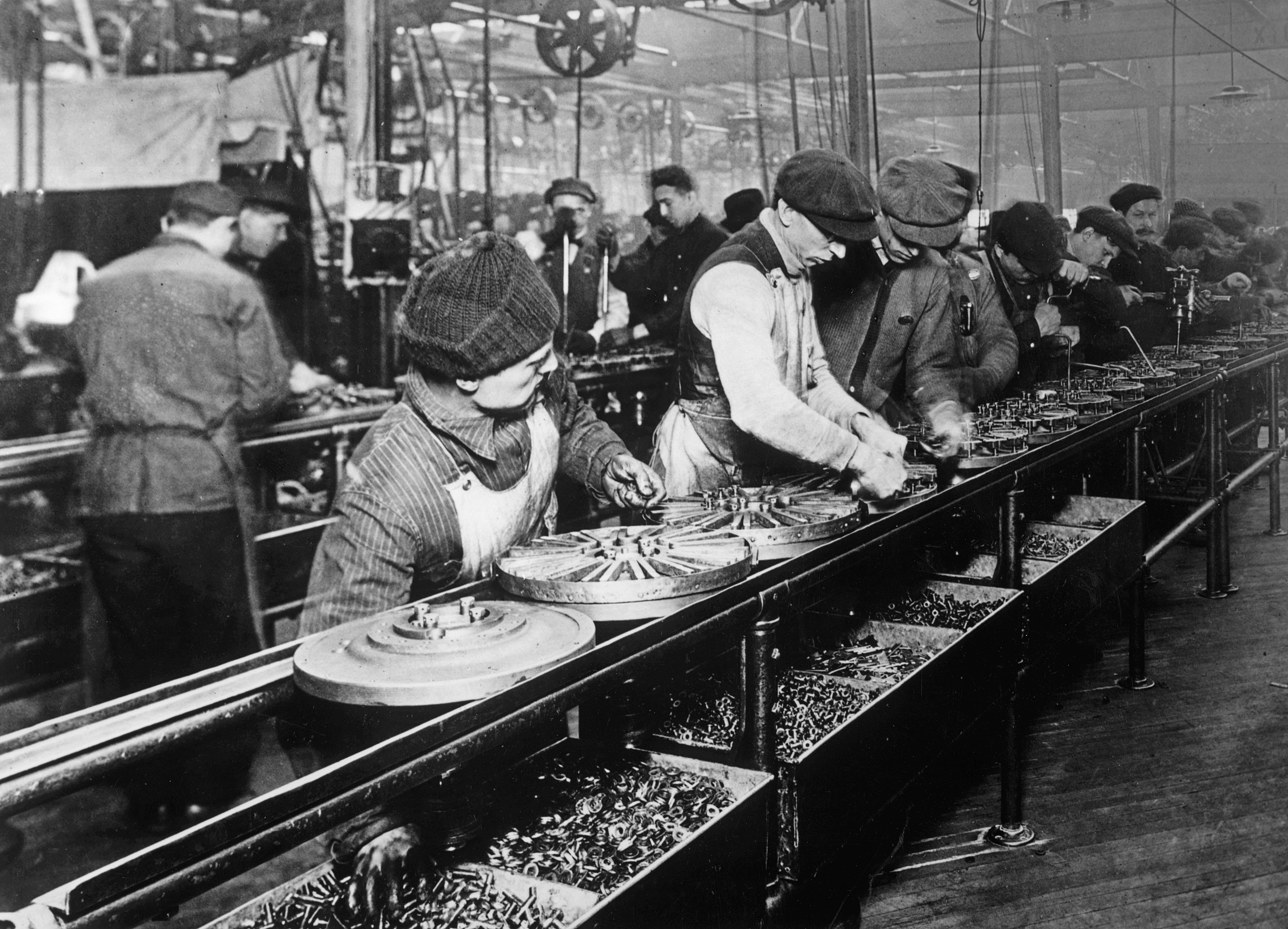
The Ford Motor Company assembly line, 1913. The factory system, with its advanced division of labour and machinery, is a key site for the production of relative surplus-value by increasing productivity.

"Relative surplus-value" is produced by shortening necessary labour-time, typically through increases in the productivity of labour in those industries that produce wage goods. If the value of the means of subsistence falls, the value of labour-power also falls, allowing the capitalist to appropriate a larger share of the working day as surplus labour-time, even if the length of the working day remains constant or is shortened.

Individual capitalists are driven by the coercive laws of competition to seek an "extra surplus-value" (or extra profit) by introducing new technologies or organisational methods that make their individual value of production lower than the social average. This extra surplus-value is ephemeral, disappearing once the new methods become generalised. This constant hunt for ephemeral extra surplus-value is the immanent drive within capitalism for perpetual technological and organisational dynamism. Marx notes that a rise in the physical standard of living of workers (more use-values) can be compatible with a rising rate of exploitation if productivity increases sufficiently.

Marx then examines the specific methods of producing relative surplus-value:

- Cooperation: The bringing together of many workers under the command of a single capitalist creates a new "social productive power of labour", a collective force greater than the sum of individual powers. This collective power appears as a productive power of capital itself. The capitalist's function of direction and supervision becomes necessary, but it is also a function of exploitation, a "despotic" command.
- Division of labour and manufacture: Manufacture, based on handicraft skills, involves breaking down the production process into specialised, partial operations performed by "detail labourers". This increases productivity but "converts the worker into a crippled monstrosity" by suppressing a "whole world of productive drives and inclinations". A hierarchical structure of labour-powers emerges, and the intellectual potentialities of production become concentrated in capital. Marx distinguishes the division of labour in the workshop (despotic and planned) from the division of labour in society (anarchic, mediated by market exchange).
- Machinery and large-scale industry: The introduction of machinery revolutionises the technical basis of production. The machine, as a tool taken out of the worker's hands and incorporated into a mechanism, confronts the worker as "capital, dead labour, that dominates, and pumps dry, living labour-power". The skill of the worker passes over to the machine, and the worker becomes a mere appendage to the "automatic system of machinery". Machinery cheapens commodities (and thus labour-power) and is a powerful weapon in the hands of capital for prolonging the working day (to recoup its value before obsolescence), intensifying labour, and suppressing worker resistance. Marx discusses the struggle between worker and machine, noting that workers eventually learn to distinguish between machinery itself and its capitalist employment. The Factory Acts, while limiting hours and regulating conditions, also accelerate the concentration of capital and the generalisation of the factory system. Large-scale industry creates the material conditions for a "new and higher synthesis" of agriculture and industry, but under capitalism, this often leads to the ruining of the soil and the worker. Marx notes the contradiction that capitalism requires an increasingly flexible, adaptable, and educated workforce ("the totally developed individual") while simultaneously degrading and stultifying labour.

==== Part V: The Production of Absolute and Relative Surplus-Value ====
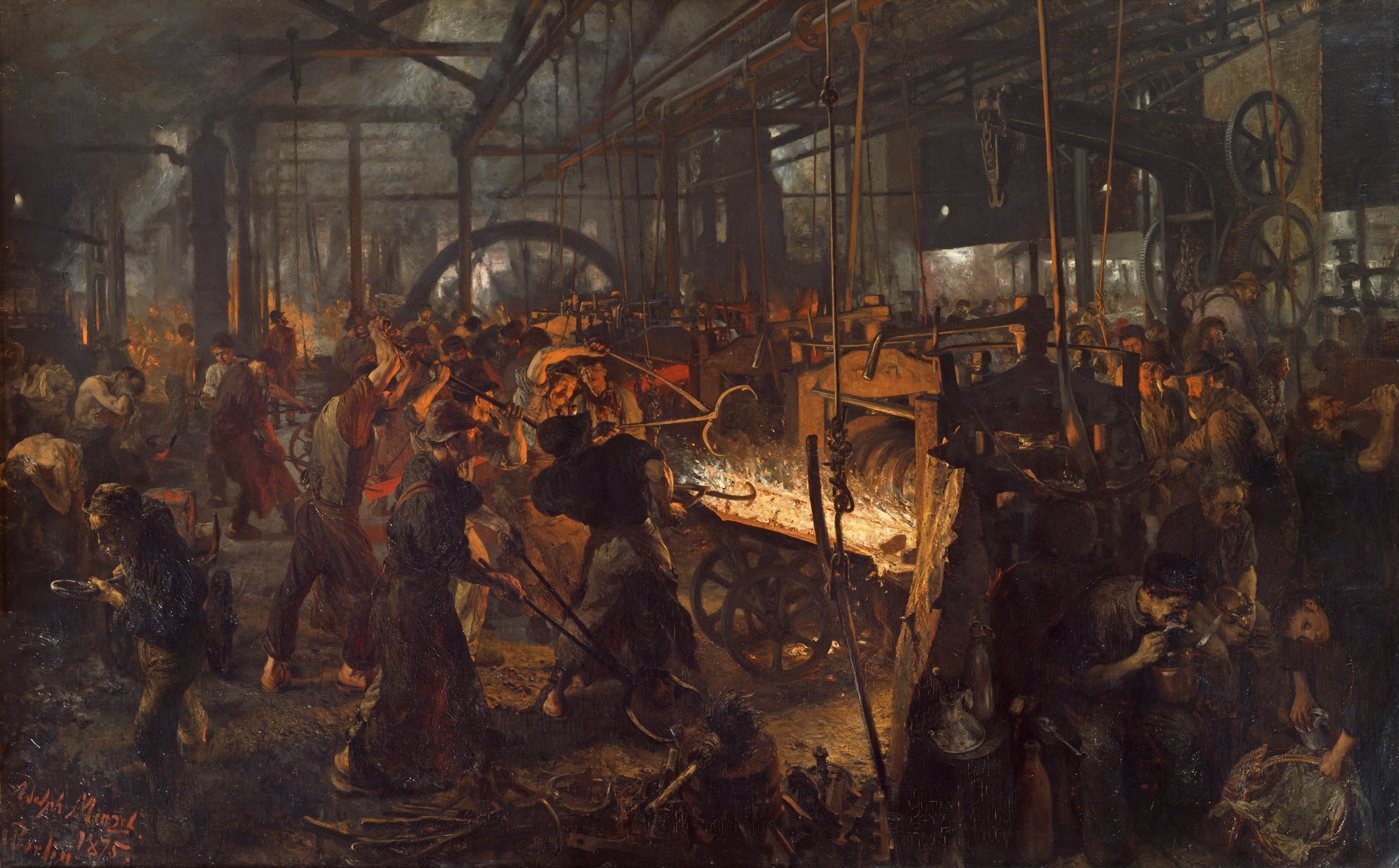
Adolph Menzel's Iron Rolling Mill (1875), depicting the intense labour process in 19th-century heavy industry, a site for the extraction of both absolute and relative surplus-value

In this part, Marx synthesises the discussions on absolute and relative surplus-value. Capitalists employ a variety of strategies to increase the rate and mass of surplus-value, often combining methods. For example, increases in productivity (relative surplus-value) can be used to intensify labour (a form of absolute surplus-value if the working day remains constant). The "form-giving fire" of living labour is the ultimate source of surplus-value, and capital's drive is to appropriate as much of this unpaid labour as possible. Marx revisits the idea of the "collective labourer", emphasising that as the scale and cooperation of production increase, the concept of productive labour expands to include not only those directly working on the material but also those involved in the general coordination and scientific application within the production process, such as engineers and managers. However, he narrows the definition from capital's perspective: "the only worker who is productive is one who produces surplus-value for the capitalist".

==== Part VI: Wages ====
Marx analyses the various forms of wages, arguing that they obscure the underlying reality of exploitation. He shows that the wage is the phenomenal form of the value, or price, of labour-power, yet it appears as the price of labour itself.

- Time wages: Wages appear as the price of labour for a certain period (e.g., per hour or day). This creates the illusion that all labour is paid labour, concealing the distinction between necessary and surplus labour-time.
- Piece wages: Wages are paid per piece produced. This form is well-suited to capitalist exploitation, as it intensifies labour and encourages workers to overwork themselves, while making supervision less necessary. It fosters competition among workers and obscures the fact that the price per piece is ultimately determined by what the average worker can produce in a given time.
- National differences in wages: Marx briefly considers how wage levels differ between countries, influenced by factors such as historical development, the cost of subsistence, the intensity of labour, and the value of money. He notes that higher wages in one country might correspond to a higher rate of surplus-value if productivity is also much higher.

==== Part VII: The Process of Accumulation of Capital ====
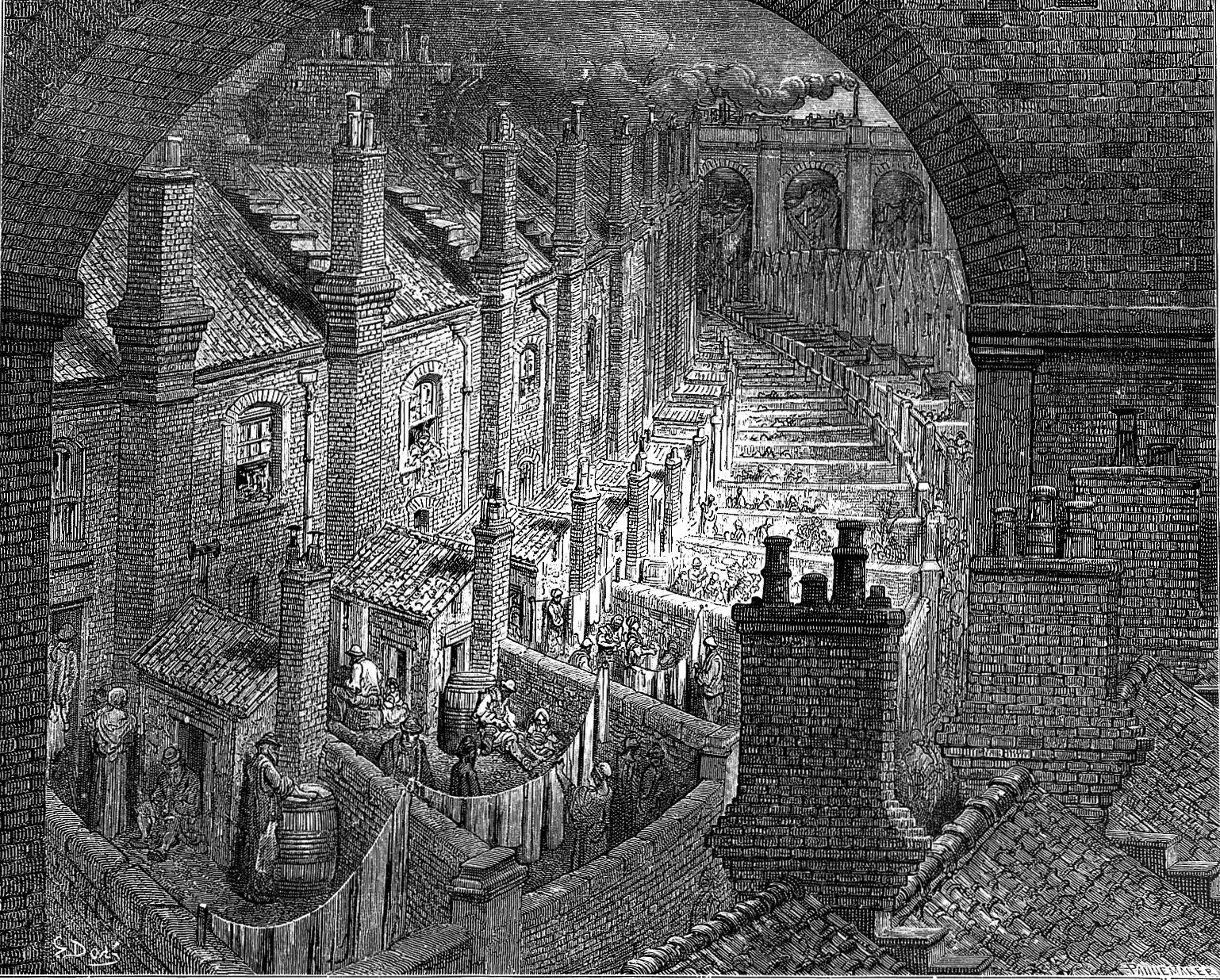
Gustave Doré's Over London by Rail (1872), illustrating the vast urban and industrial expansion characteristic of capitalist accumulation in Marx's era

This part examines how surplus-value is reconverted into capital, leading to capital accumulation on an ever-expanding scale. Marx's analysis here operates under specific assumptions: a closed system (no foreign trade), no problems of realising commodities at their values, and the exclusion of the division of surplus-value into rent, interest, and industrial profit.

- Simple reproduction: Marx first considers a hypothetical scenario where the entire surplus-value is consumed by the capitalist as revenue, meaning capital is merely reproduced on the same scale. Even under these conditions, he argues, the continuity of the production process means that all capital eventually becomes capitalised surplus-value. The worker constantly produces the capital that exploits them, and the capital relation itself is reproduced.
- Expanded reproduction (accumulation): Capitalists are driven by the "historical mission" of "accumulation for accumulation's sake, production for production's sake". Part of the surplus-value is capitalised, i.e., used to purchase additional means of production and labour-power, leading to production on an expanded scale. Marx critiques classical political economy's "erroneous conceptions" of accumulation, particularly its neglect of the need to produce additional means of production (constant capital) alongside additional means of subsistence for an expanded workforce. The capitalist's drive to accumulate is presented as an objective necessity imposed by competition, rather than mere subjective greed.
- The general law of capitalist accumulation: Accumulation affects the demand for labour. If the "organic composition of capital" (c/v, the ratio of constant to variable capital, reflecting productivity) remains constant, accumulation leads to increased demand for labour-power, potentially raising wages. However, the general tendency of capitalist accumulation is towards a rising organic composition of capital, as capitalists introduce labour-saving machinery in pursuit of relative surplus-value and to gain competitive advantage. This means that the demand for labour falls relative to the magnitude of the total capital.

Capitalist accumulation "constantly produces... a relatively redundant working population, i.e. a population which is superfluous to capital's average requirements for its own valorisation, and is therefore a surplus population". This "industrial reserve army" (or "relative surplus population") is a necessary product of accumulation and a condition for its existence, providing a readily available supply of labour for expansion and exerting downward pressure on wages. Marx identifies different forms of the reserve army: the "floating" (e.g., temporarily unemployed factory workers), the "latent" (e.g., agricultural populations being drawn into industry, or women and children entering the workforce), and the "stagnant" (e.g., irregularly employed workers, including those in the "sphere of pauperism" like vagabonds and criminals).

The "absolute general law of capitalist accumulation" is that "in proportion as capital accumulates, the situation of the worker, be his payment high or low, must grow worse". Marx's argument here concerns the relative impoverishment of the working class: workers receive a smaller part of the new value they produce, and their needs as human beings are increasingly denied by the alienating and dehumanising production process. This leads to an "accumulation of misery, the torment of labour, slavery, ignorance, brutalisation and moral degradation at the opposite pole" to the accumulation of wealth.

==== Part VIII: So-Called Primitive Accumulation ====
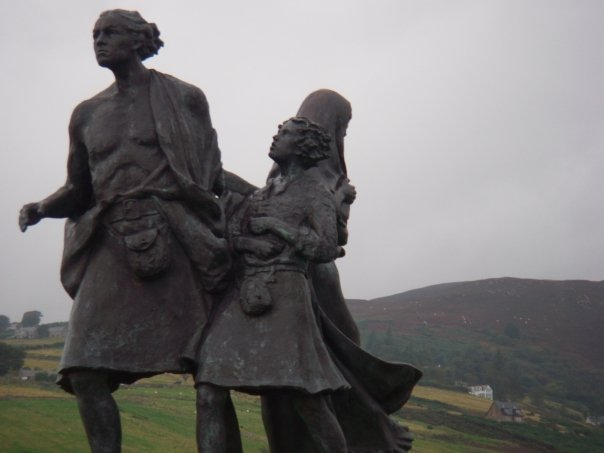
Statue in Helmsdale, Scotland, depicting emigrants from the Highland Clearances. The clearances are an example of the forcible expropriation of the agricultural population from the land, a key aspect of primitive accumulation described by Marx.

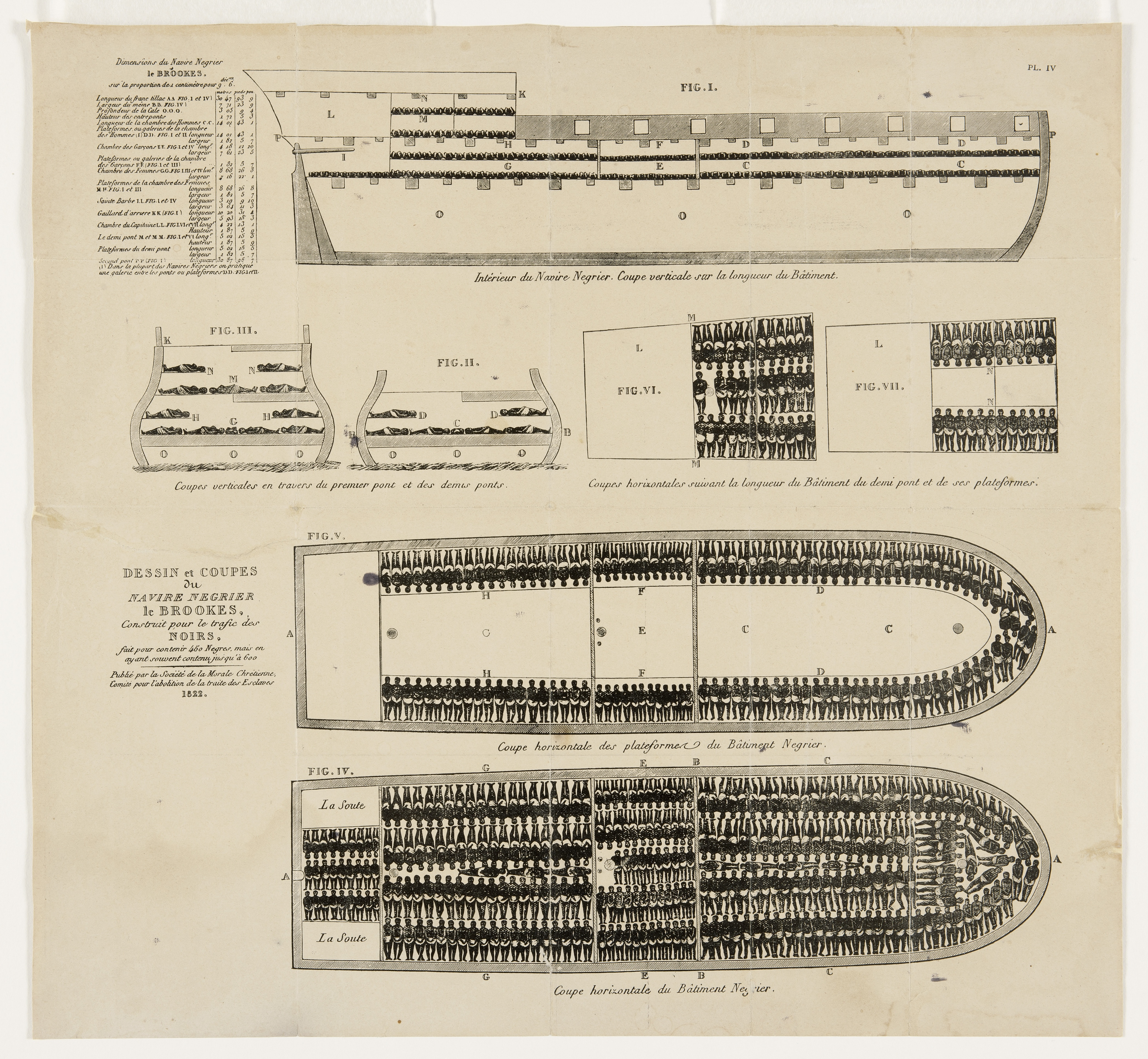
Diagram of the British slave ship Brookes, 1788. Marx identified the slave trade as a significant component of primitive accumulation, providing wealth for early capitalist development.

In the final part of Volume I, Marx addresses the historical origins of the capital relation, a process he terms "primitive accumulation". This process is "primitive" because it forms the pre-history of capital and the capitalist mode of production, establishing the fundamental conditions for capitalist accumulation to begin. Marx contrasts his historical account with the "idyllic methods" portrayed by classical political economy, which he dismisses as a "children's fable" that depicts the emergence of capital and wage-labour as a gradual and peaceful result of diligence and frugality. For Marx, "in actual history, it is notorious that conquest, enslavement, robbery, murder, in short, force, play the greatest part".

Primitive accumulation is fundamentally the historical process of "divorcing the producer from the means of production". This involves two transformations: the social means of subsistence and production are turned into capital, and the immediate producers are turned into wage-labourers. Key aspects of primitive accumulation include:

- Expropriation of the agricultural population from the land: Marx details the enclosure of common lands, the dissolution of feudal bands of retainers, and the forcible eviction of peasants, particularly in England from the late 15th to the 19th century. This created a "free and rightless" proletariat for urban industries. The "law itself now becomes the instrument by which the people's land is stolen".
- Bloody legislation against the expropriated: Those driven off the land were often criminalised as vagabonds and beggars, subjected to "grotesquely terroristic laws" that whipped, branded, and tortured them into accepting the discipline of the wage-labour system.
- Genesis of the capitalist farmer and the industrial capitalist: Marx traces the emergence of the capitalist tenant farmer and the rise of industrial capital, often aided by state power, colonialism, the public debt system, protectionist policies, and the slave trade. "Force is the midwife of every old society which is pregnant with a new one. It is itself an economic power."
- The "secret" of primitive accumulation and colonialism: Marx concludes with a discussion of Edward Gibbon Wakefield's theory of colonisation. Wakefield "discovered" that capital is not a thing but a social relation between persons mediated through things. In colonies like Australia, where land was cheap and labourers could easily become independent producers, capital could not function. The "great secret" was the necessity of the state to artificially raise the price of land or otherwise restrict access to it, to ensure a supply of wage-labourers for capital. This, for Marx, revealed the artificial and historically constructed nature of the capital relation, dependent on the expropriation of the worker.

Marx argues that the "expropriation of the great mass of the people" by a few usurpers is eventually superseded by the "expropriation of a few usurpers by the great mass of the people", as the contradictions of capitalism and the organisation of the working class lead to the "knell of capitalist private property".

=== Volume II: The Process of Circulation of Capital ===
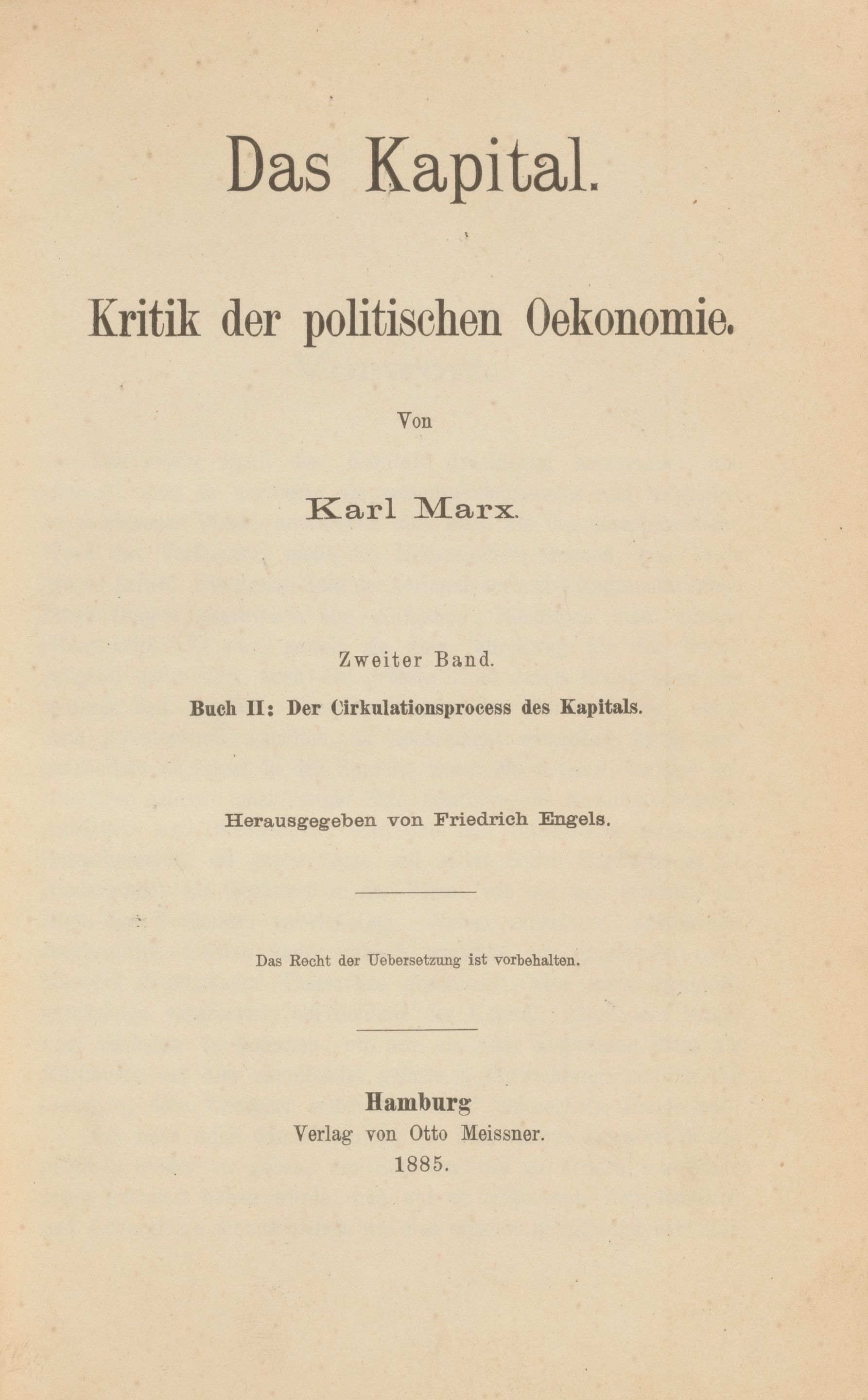
Title page of Volume II (1885)

Volume II, published by Engels in 1885, shifts the focus from the immediate production process to the process of circulation of capital. While Volume I assumed that commodities could be sold at their values without difficulty, Volume II examines the conditions and contradictions involved in realising the value and surplus-value produced. Marx's analysis here is highly abstract and technical, often abstracting from technological change and assuming commodities exchange at their values to isolate the specific problems of circulation.

==== Part I: The Metamorphoses of Capital and Their Circuits ====
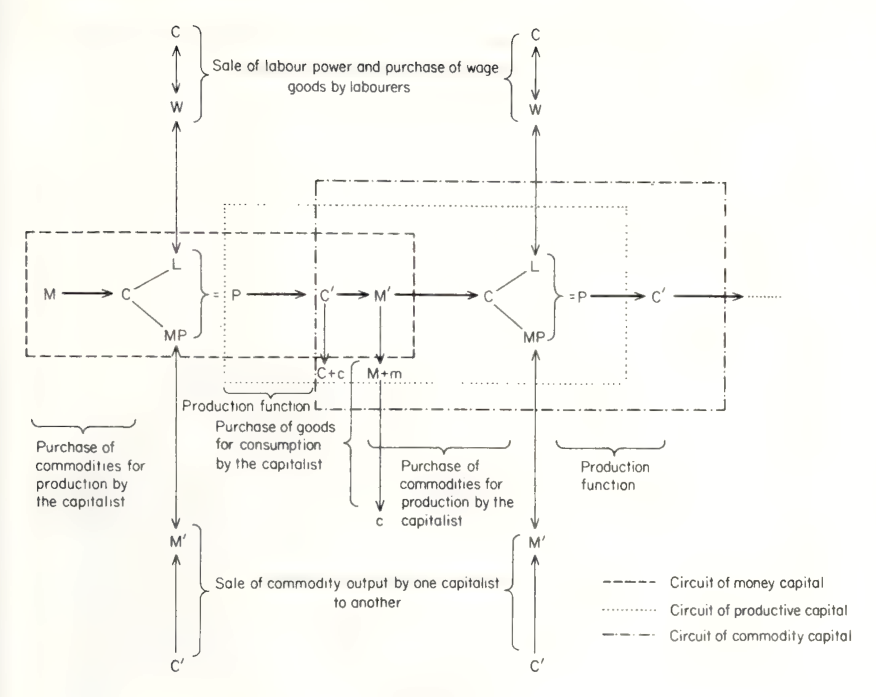
The three circuits of capital in Capital, Volume II, as charted by Meghnad Desai. L = labour-power; MP = means of production.

Marx analyses the circulation of industrial capital as a unity of three intertwined circuits, corresponding to the different forms capital takes:

- Circuit of money capital (M-C...P...C'-M'): Capital begins as money (M), is transformed into commodities (C) (labour-power and means of production), passes through the production process (P) to create new commodities (C') impregnated with surplus-value, which are then sold for more money (M'). This circuit emphasises the role of money as the starting and end point, highlighting capital's aim of "money making".
- Circuit of productive capital (P...C'-M'-C...P): This circuit begins and ends with capital in its productive form (P). It emphasises the necessity of continuous production and the reconversion of realised commodity capital (M') back into the elements of productive capital (C – labour-power and means of production).
- Circuit of commodity capital (C'-M'-C...P...C'): Starting and ending with commodity capital (C'), this circuit highlights the aggregate flow of commodities in the economy as a whole, including both means of production and means of consumption.

Marx stresses that these are not independent types of capital but functional forms that industrial capital successively assumes and sheds. The continuity of capital flow through these metamorphoses is crucial, and any interruption or blockage in one phase (e.g., unsaleable commodities, lack of money, or disruptions in production) affects the entire process. The time capital spends in the sphere of circulation (buying and selling) is "circulation time", and the time spent in production is "production time". Reducing circulation time is crucial for accelerating the "turnover of capital". This section also considers the costs of circulation (e.g., transport, storage, bookkeeping), which are necessary but unproductive of value.

==== Part II: The Turnover of Capital ====
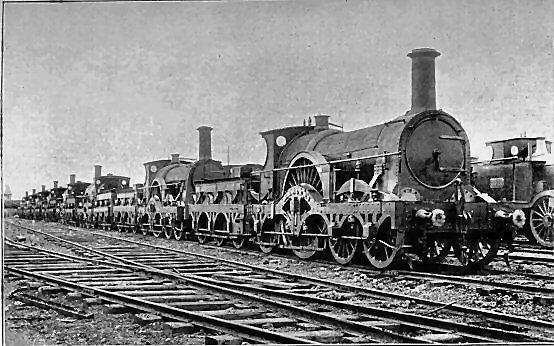
Great Western Railway steam locomotives, 1892. The development of railways drastically reduced turnover times for capital, a critical aspect of accumulation discussed in Volume II.

This part examines the turnover of capital, defined as the sum of its production time and circulation time. The speed of turnover influences the annual rate of surplus-value and the mass of surplus-value produced by a given capital.

Marx distinguishes between "fixed capital" and "circulating capital", a distinction of productive capital from the perspective of the circulation mode of value.

- Circulating capital includes raw materials, auxiliary materials, and the part of capital laid out in wages (variable capital). These components transfer their value entirely to the product in a single turnover period and must be constantly renewed.
- Fixed capital comprises the instruments of labour (machines, buildings, etc.) which transfer their value to the product gradually, bit by bit, over multiple turnover periods corresponding to their average lifetime. The circulation of fixed capital involves peculiar problems, such as the need to accumulate a sinking fund for its eventual replacement and the issue of "moral depreciation" (obsolescence due to new, more efficient machinery being introduced before the old is physically worn out).

Marx discusses how the development of transport and communications shortens circulation time and how the credit system can help to overcome the rigidities imposed by fixed capital and differential turnover times.

==== Part III: The Reproduction and Circulation of the Aggregate Social Capital ====
In the final part, Marx analyses the reproduction of the total social capital, using what he termed his "reproduction schemas". He divides the entire economy into two major departments:

- Department I: Produces means of production (things used to make other things, e.g., machines and steel).
- Department II: Produces means of consumption (things people buy and use to live, e.g., bread and clothing).

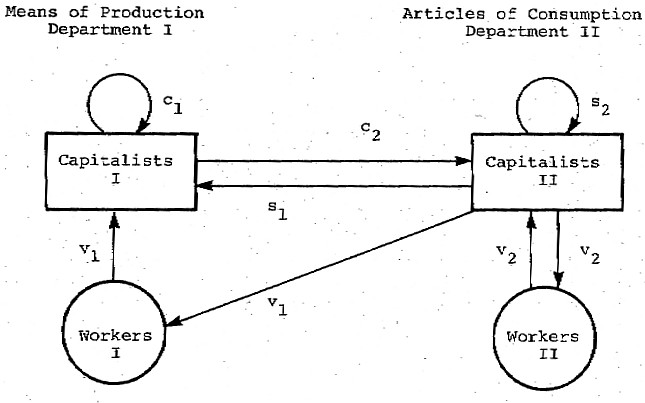
Marx's two-department model of simple reproduction. Each arrow represents a commodity exchange from seller to buyer, with money flowing in the opposite direction.

For "simple reproduction" (where all surplus-value is consumed as revenue and there is no net accumulation), an equilibrium condition must be met: the constant capital of Department II (c2) must be equal to the sum of the variable capital and surplus-value of Department I (v1 + s1). This means that the demand for means of production from Department II must match the demand for means of consumption from the workers and capitalists in Department I.

For "expanded reproduction" (accumulation), a portion of the surplus-value in both departments must be capitalised, i.e., reinvested to purchase additional means of production and labour-power. This requires a different set of equilibrium conditions. Marx demonstrates arithmetically how such balanced growth is theoretically possible, but also highlights the numerous points at which disproportionalities and crises can arise due to the "anarchic" nature of capitalist production and the complexities of interdepartmental exchanges, particularly concerning the replacement of fixed capital. He emphasises the crucial role of money capital and the "virtual money capital" (hoarded savings) in mediating these exchanges and facilitating accumulation, hinting at the necessity of a credit system which is largely abstracted from in Volume II.

The "ultimate reason for all real crises", Marx notes, "always remains the poverty and restricted consumption of the masses, in the face of the drive of capitalist production to develop the productive forces as if only the absolute consumption capacity of society set a limit to them".

=== Volume III: The Process of Capitalist Production as a Whole ===
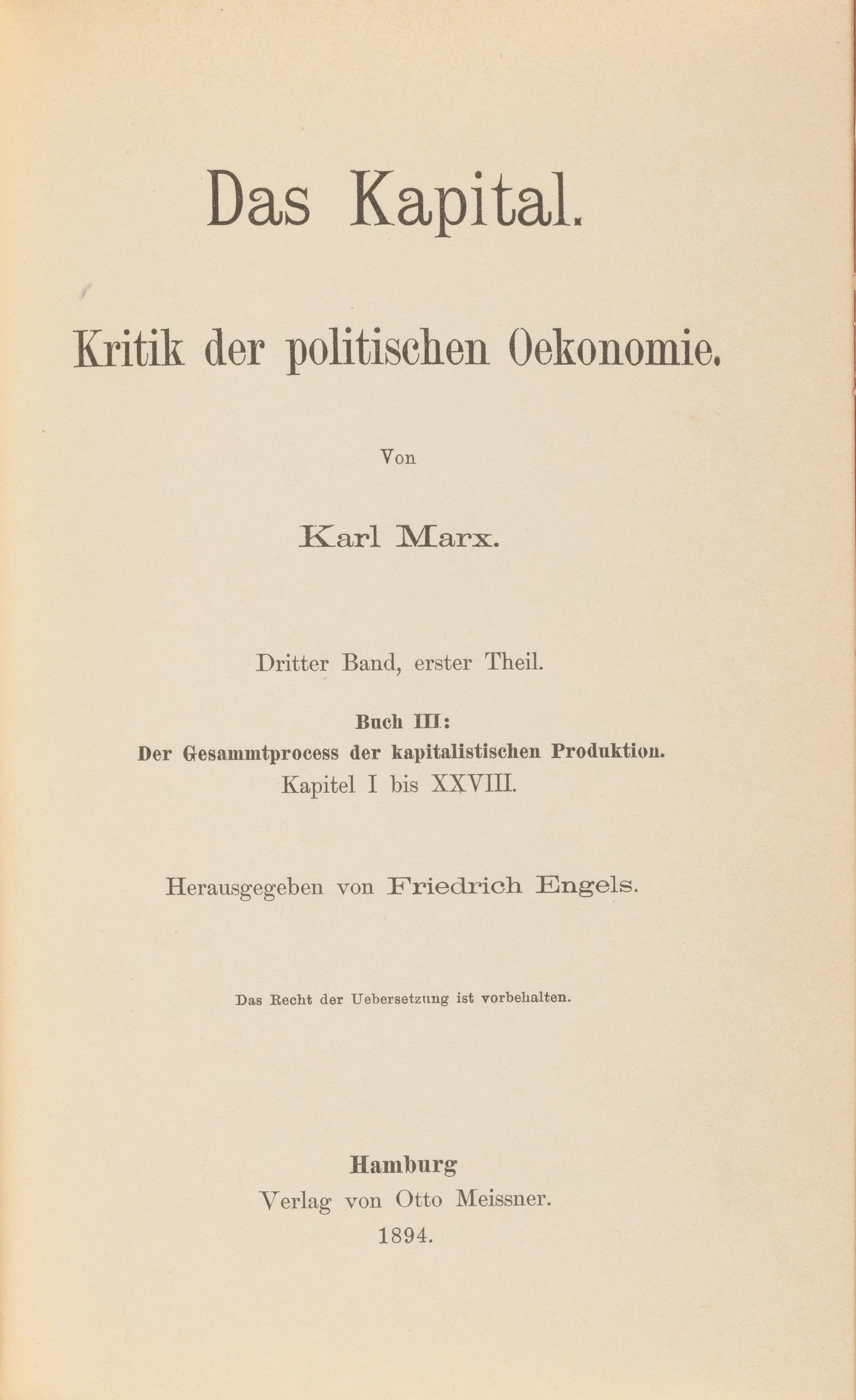
Title page of Volume III (1894)

Volume III, published by Engels in 1894, aims to depict the capitalist mode of production in its totality, as it appears on the surface of society, involving competition between capitals and the distribution of surplus-value into various forms of revenue. It integrates the analyses of production (Volume I) and circulation (Volume II) to explain the "concrete forms which grow out of the process of capital's movement considered as a whole".

==== Part I: The Transformation of Surplus-Value into Profit and of the Rate of Surplus-Value into the Rate of Profit ====
Marx begins by examining how surplus-value appears to the individual capitalist as profit. While surplus-value is calculated on variable capital alone (s/v), profit is calculated on the total capital advanced (constant + variable capital, or C = c + v). The rate of profit is therefore s/C or s/(c+v). This form of appearance mystifies the origin of surplus-value in the exploitation of labour, making it seem as if profit arises from the total capital advanced. The capitalist is primarily concerned with the rate of profit, not the rate of surplus-value. Marx discusses various factors that can affect the rate of profit, including the economisation in the use of constant capital and the acceleration of capital turnover.

==== Part II: The Transformation of Profit into Average Profit ====
Competition between capitals in different spheres of production, with varying organic compositions (c/v), leads to the formation of a "general rate of profit" or "average profit". Capitals tend to flow from spheres with lower rates of profit to those with higher rates, leading to an equalisation of profit rates across the economy. This means that individual capitals do not appropriate the surplus-value produced directly within their own sphere but rather a share of the total social surplus-value proportional to their share of the total social capital.

Consequently, commodities do not exchange at their individual values (c+v+s) but at "prices of production", which are equal to their cost-price (c+v) plus the average profit. This transformation of values into prices of production represents a further mystification of the source of profit and the nature of exploitation. Marx's quantitative method for this transformation has been a subject of extensive debate (the "transformation problem").

==== Part III: The Law of the Tendency of the Rate of Profit to Fall ====
Rates of profit in six core countries from 1850 to 2010, as charted by Esteban Maito. The introduction of labour-saving machinery increases the organic composition of capital, which, according to Marx, contributes to a tendency of the rate of profit to fall.

Marx argues that there is an inherent tendency for the general rate of profit to fall in the long run. This tendency arises from the typically capitalist method of increasing productivity, which involves a rising organic composition of capital (c/v) – meaning more constant capital (machinery, raw materials) is used relative to variable capital (labour-power). Since only variable capital produces surplus-value, a rising c/v (even with an increasing rate of surplus-value s/v) will tend to depress the rate of profit s/(c+v).

Marx presents this "law" as "the most important law of modern political economy". However, he also outlines several "counteracting tendencies" that can offset or temporarily reverse the fall in the rate of profit. These include: increasing the intensity of exploitation, depression of wages below the value of labour-power, cheapening of the elements of constant capital, relative overpopulation, foreign trade, and the increase of stock capital. The law operates as a tendency, subject to these countervailing forces, and its actual manifestation is complex and can lead to crises. The validity and precise formulation of this law have been among the most debated aspects of Marx's theory.

==== Part IV: The Transformation of Commodity-Capital and Money-Capital into Commercial-Capital and Financial-Capital ====
This part, which Marx also refers to as dealing with "merchant's capital" or "trading capital", examines forms of capital that operate exclusively within the sphere of circulation.

- Commercial capital (commodity-dealing capital) undertakes the functions of buying and selling commodities (C-M and M-C). While it creates no value or surplus-value itself, it helps to reduce the circulation time of industrial capital and facilitate the realisation of surplus-value. Commercial capital obtains a share of the total surplus-value in the form of commercial profit, which is equalised with the average rate of profit. The labour employed by commercial capitalists (e.g., clerks) is unproductive of surplus-value, though it is exploited.
- Money-dealing capital specialises in the technical operations of handling money (payments, collections, bookkeeping, etc.) for the capitalist class as a whole.

==== Part V: The Division of Profit into Interest and Profit of Enterprise. Interest-Bearing Capital ====
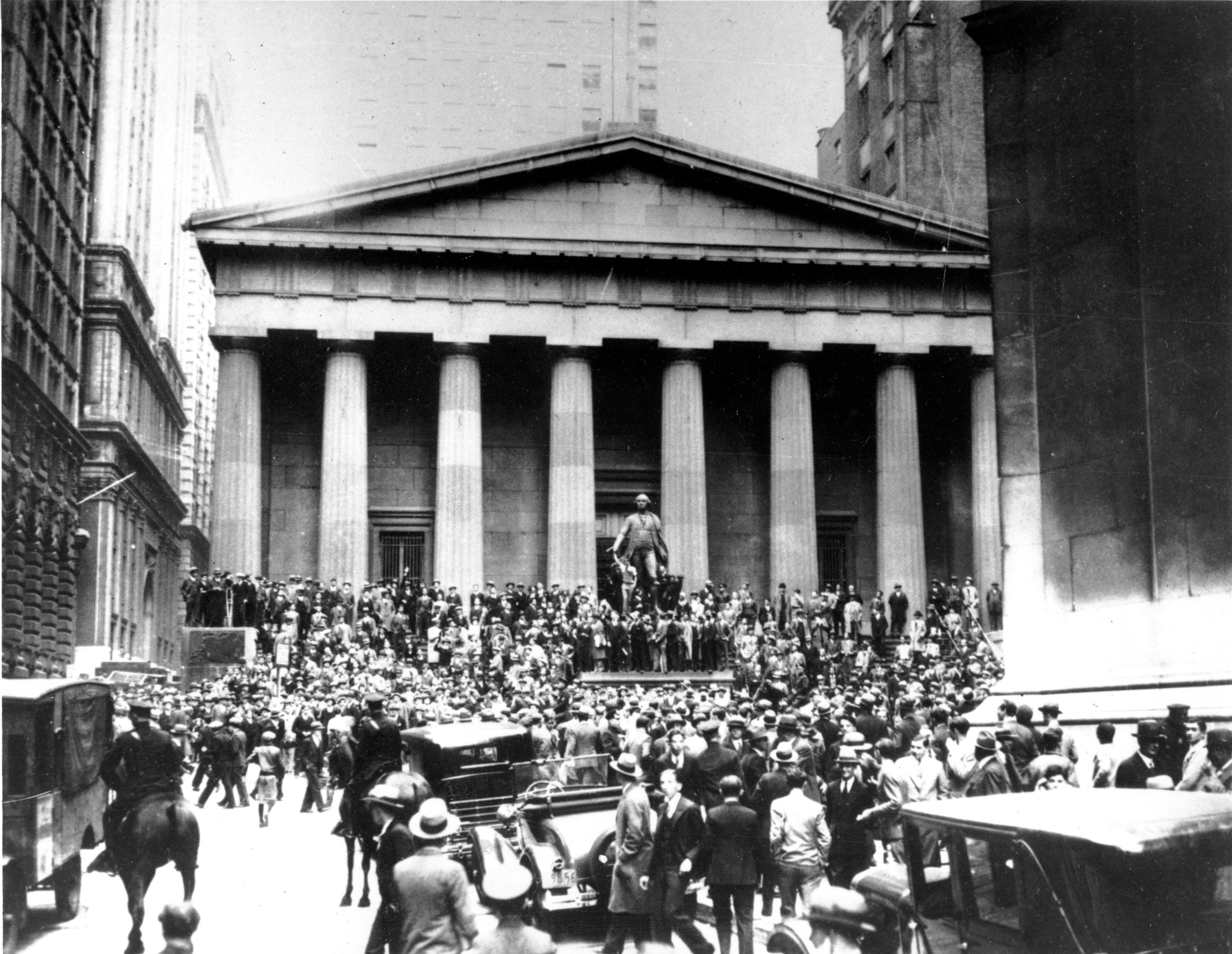
Crowd outside the New York Stock Exchange during the crash of 1929. Volume III analyses the role of credit, interest, and fictitious capital, which are central to understanding financial markets and crises.

Here, Marx analyses "interest-bearing capital", where money itself appears to beget more money (M-M'). The owner of money capital (the "money-capitalist" or financier) lends it to a functioning capitalist (industrial or commercial), who employs it to produce surplus-value. The surplus-value (gross profit) is then divided between the functioning capitalist, who receives "profit of enterprise", and the money-capitalist, who receives interest.

Interest is the price paid for the use-value of money capital – its capacity to function as capital and produce profit. The rate of interest is determined by supply and demand for money capital and by competition between lenders and borrowers; there is no "natural" rate of interest. This division makes profit of enterprise appear as the "wages of superintendence" for the functioning capitalist, while interest appears as the fruit of mere ownership of capital. This is the "most superficial and fetishised form" of the capital relation, where capital appears as an automatic, self-valorising source, "money breeding money".

The development of the credit system and banking centralises money capital and transforms it into social capital, available to all capitalists. This accelerates accumulation but also intensifies contradictions and crises. Marx discusses the role of banks in concentrating loanable capital and creating credit money (e.g., banknotes, bills of exchange).

"Fictitious capital" arises with the development of tradable securities like government bonds and company shares. These represent titles to a stream of future revenue (interest or dividends) and their market price (capitalised value) can fluctuate independently of the real capital they supposedly represent, leading to speculation and financial crises. Marx examines the dynamics of the industrial cycle (boom, crisis, stagnation, recovery), highlighting the role of credit and fictitious capital in both fuelling speculation and precipitating crashes. He critiques the "currency principle" and the Bank Act of 1844 in Britain, arguing that such legislation cannot abolish crises, which are inherent in the capitalist mode of production.

==== Part VI: The Transformation of Surplus-Profit into Ground-Rent ====
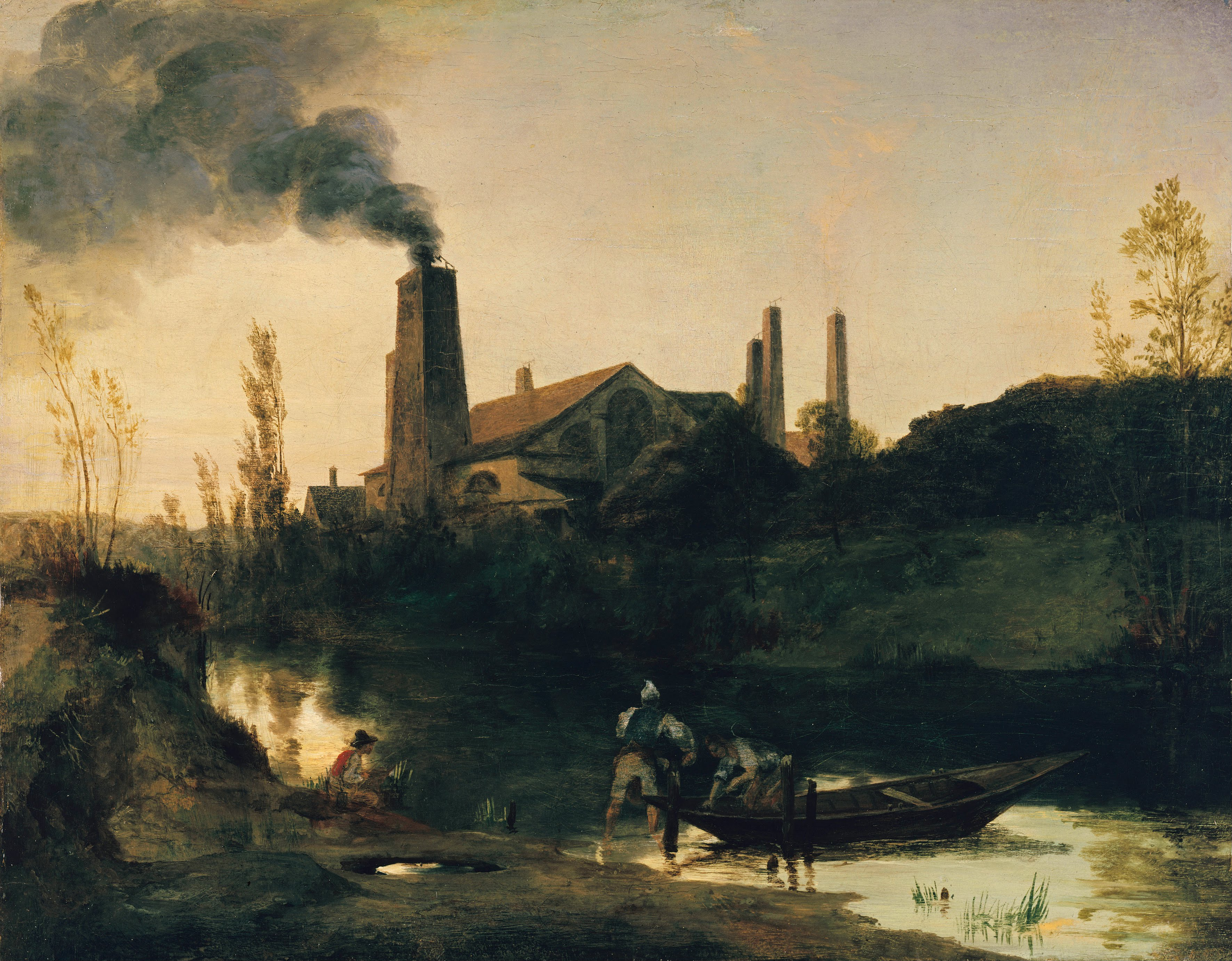
Carl Blechen's The Neustadt-Eberswalde Rolling Mill (1830). Marx's analysis of ground rent in Volume III examines how surplus-value is appropriated through the private ownership of land.

This part examines "ground rent", the portion of surplus-value paid to landowners for the use of land. It represents a form of "surplus profit", i.e., profit over and above the average rate of profit, which arises due to monopolies. Marx distinguishes between different forms of rent:

- "Differential rent" arises from differences in the fertility or location of land (a form of "natural monopoly"). More fertile or better-located land yields a surplus profit for the capitalists cultivating it, which is then appropriated by the landowner as differential rent.
- "Absolute rent" arises from the private monopoly of landownership, which allows landowners to extract a rent even from the least fertile land, independent of its productive qualities. This is possible because capital invested in agriculture typically has a lower organic composition than the social average, thus producing more surplus-value, a part of which can be siphoned off as absolute rent by landowners without violating the general tendency towards the equalisation of profit rates.

Marx also discusses the price of land, which is the capitalised ground rent, and the historical development of capitalist relations in agriculture.

==== Part VII: The Revenues and Their Sources ====
In the final part, Marx critiques the "trinity formula" (Capital–Profit/Interest, Land–Rent, Labour–Wages), which represents the three main classes of bourgeois society and their respective sources of revenue as naturally arising from three independent factors of production. This formula, Marx argues, is the consummate expression of the mystification inherent in the capitalist mode of production. It presents capital, land, and labour as coequal, independent sources of wealth, obscuring the fact that profit and rent are derived from the surplus-value created by labour. It reifies social relations, making it appear as if things (capital, land) have the inherent power to produce value, while labour is merely one factor among others. This "bewitched, distorted and upside-down world" is the basis of everyday consciousness and the categories of vulgar political economy.

Volume III, and effectively Capital as a whole (as Marx left it), is concluded with a very brief, unfinished chapter on "Classes", where Marx begins to define classes based on their ownership of the means of production and their sources of revenue before the manuscript breaks off.

== Themes ==
Capital explores a wide range of themes central to the critique of political economy. These themes are interwoven throughout the three volumes, often introduced in one context and then further developed or re-examined in others.

=== Commodity, value, and money ===
Diagram illustrating Marx's theory of value

Marx's analysis begins with the commodity as the "elementary form" of wealth in capitalist societies. A commodity possesses a dual character: it has a use-value, satisfying a human need or want, and an exchange-value, the quantitative proportion in which it exchanges for other commodities. Marx argues that underlying exchange-value is "value", an immaterial social substance representing "congealed" abstract human labour. The magnitude of value is determined by the socially necessary labour time required for a commodity's production under average social conditions of skill and intensity. This labour theory of value is foundational to Marx's critique, though it differs significantly from classical formulations in his insistence that labour is not just the measure but the only source of value, and that exchange-value itself is a transient, historical phenomenon, not a natural one. Labour itself, as the expenditure of human labour-power, creates value but does not itself possess value.

The exchange of commodities necessitates a money commodity (historically gold or silver) to serve as a universal equivalent, expressing the values of all other commodities. Money functions as a measure of value (allowing values to be expressed as prices), a medium of circulation (facilitating C-M-C), a hoard (store of value), a means of payment (settling debts), and world money. Marx's theory of value is thus a monetary theory of value; value cannot be expressed or realised without money. The development of the money form, including credit money, is crucial for the circulation of capital.

=== Capital and surplus-value ===
Diagram illustrating Marx's theory of surplus value

Capital is not a thing (like money or machines) but a process: "value in motion", specifically "self-valorising value" that becomes an "automatic subject". It follows the circuit M-C-M', where money (M) is advanced to purchase commodities (C – labour-power and means of production) in order to produce new commodities which are sold for a greater sum of money (M'). The increment (ΔM) is surplus value. The capitalist, as the "conscious bearer" of this movement, is driven by the relentless pursuit of surplus-value and accumulation.

Surplus-value originates from the exploitation of labour power, the unique commodity whose use-value is the capacity to create more value than it itself costs. The capitalist purchases labour-power at its value (determined by the socially necessary labour-time required for its reproduction) and, in the production process, compels the labourer to work for a longer period than is necessary to reproduce the value of their labour-power. This unpaid surplus labour is the source of surplus-value. The rate of surplus-value (s/v, the ratio of surplus labour to necessary labour) is the measure of this exploitation. Marx distinguishes between absolute surplus-value (produced by prolonging the working day) and relative surplus-value (produced by shortening necessary labour-time, typically through increases in productivity that cheapen wage goods).

In this sense, capital is a historically specific form of social relations—an alienated, self-moving totality with an immanent temporal dynamic that confronts individuals as a quasi-objective power. Moishe Postone describes this dynamic as a "treadmill effect": higher productivity increases the amount of material wealth produced per hour, but because the value of the total product remains tied to the abstract labour time expended (which does not change), the value per unit falls. This compels capitalists to constantly increase productivity just to maintain the same value creation, leading to an ever-accelerating "treadmill" of production. In the words of Wendy Brown, this drive makes capital an "almighty shredder of all life forms and practices", creating what Marx and Friedrich Engels described in The Communist Manifesto as a social order in which "all that is solid melts into air".

=== Fetishism and mystification ===
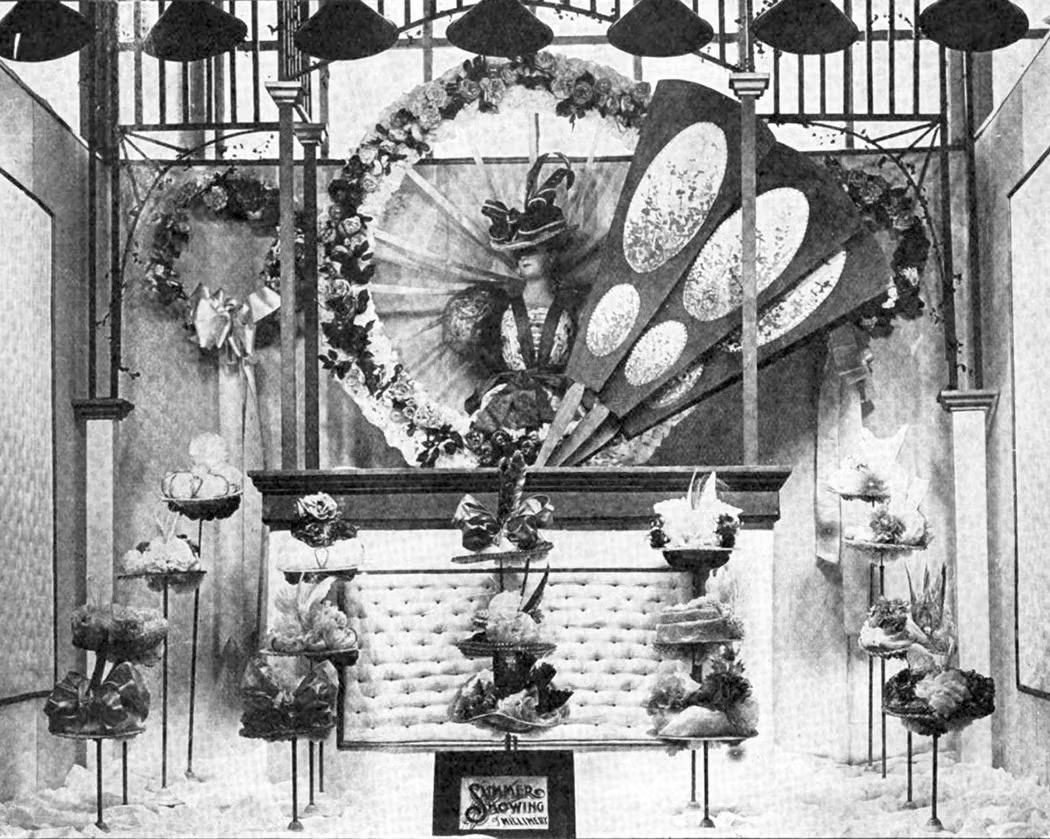
A hat shop window, c. 1900, illustrating Marx's concept of commodity fetishism. The products appear to have inherent value and desirability, a mystification that conceals the social relations of the workers who produced them.

A pervasive theme in Capital is the concept of fetishism, which describes how, under capitalism, social relations between people appear as relations between things. The products of labour, as commodities, seem to possess intrinsic value, and market exchanges appear to be governed by objective properties of these things, rather than by the underlying social relations of production between private producers. According to Leszek Kołakowski, fetishism represents the "inability of human beings to see their own products for what they are", a direct continuation of Marx's earlier theory of alienation and his analogy with the religious alienation described by Ludwig Feuerbach. This "enchanted, distorted and upside-down world" is not merely a subjective illusion or "false consciousness" but an objective appearance that arises from the very structure of commodity production and exchange, which occurs under the "sign of freedom" but obscures the underlying power dynamics. Postone interprets this as a system of "abstract domination," where impersonal, objective social forms like value and capital dominate the very people who create them.

This fetishism extends to money (the "money fetish", where money appears to have its own inherent power to create more money) and to capital itself (the "capital fetish", where capital appears as an automatic, self-expanding entity, and machines seem to be productive of value). The wage form, for example, mystifies exploitation by making it appear that the worker is paid for all their labour, concealing the distinction between paid (necessary) and unpaid (surplus) labour. The trinity formula (Capital–Profit, Land–Rent, Labour–Wages) represents the ultimate mystification, presenting the sources of revenue as naturally arising from independent factors of production, obscuring their common origin in surplus-value extracted from labour. Marx's critique aims to penetrate these fetishised appearances to reveal the underlying social relations and contradictions of capitalism. The literary scholar Francis Wheen argues that the book's complex, multilayered style—which can be read as a Gothic novel, a picaresque journey, or a satire—is a deliberate strategy to do justice to the "deranged logic" and "metaphysical subtleties and theological niceties" of a system where human relations are disguised.

=== Process of accumulation and its contradictions ===
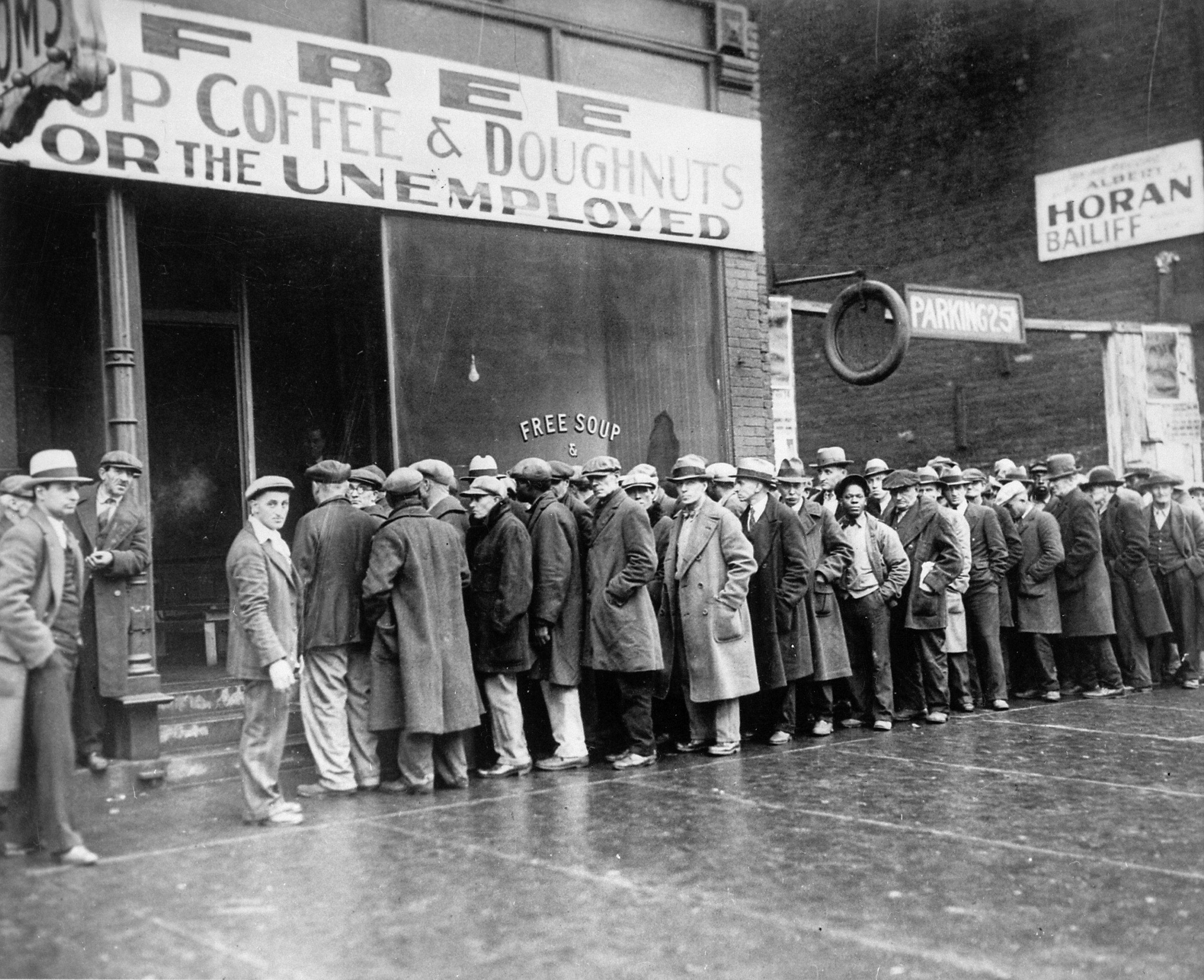
Unemployed men outside a soup kitchen in Chicago during the Great Depression, 1931. Marx's "general law of capitalist accumulation" posits that the accumulation of wealth at one pole is accompanied by the accumulation of misery and the creation of a reserve army of labour at the other.

Capitalism is driven by the "historical mission" of accumulation for accumulation's sake, production for production's sake. Surplus-value is reconverted into new capital, leading to production on an ever-expanding scale. This process, however, is fraught with contradictions.

The "general law of capitalist accumulation" posits that accumulation, by fostering a rising organic composition of capital (more machinery relative to labour), tends to create a relative surplus population (unemployment). This reserve army serves to depress wages and discipline the employed working class, but it also leads to the "accumulation of misery" at one pole corresponding to the accumulation of wealth at the other. Marx also identifies a tendency of the rate of profit to fall (TRPF) in Volume III. As the organic composition of capital rises with technological progress, and since only living labour (variable capital) produces surplus-value, the rate of profit (s/[c+v]) tends to decline, even if the rate of surplus-value (s/v) increases. Marx outlines several counteracting tendencies, making the law's actual manifestation complex and a source of crises.

The reproduction of the total social capital, examined through Marx's reproduction schemas in Volume II, reveals the complex interdependencies between Department I (producing means of production) and Department II (producing means of consumption). Maintaining equilibrium (proportionality) between these departments is crucial for smooth accumulation, but the "anarchic" nature of capitalist production and the separation of sale and purchase mean that crises of disproportionality (overproduction or underconsumption) are constant possibilities. The credit system becomes essential to mediate these flows and overcome temporal and spatial gaps in circulation, but it also introduces new forms of instability and the potential for financial crises. Marx developed a multi-causal theory of crisis, integrating the falling rate of profit, disproportionality, and the contradiction between production's drive to expand limitlessly and the restricted consumption of the masses.

=== Class struggle and historical transformation ===
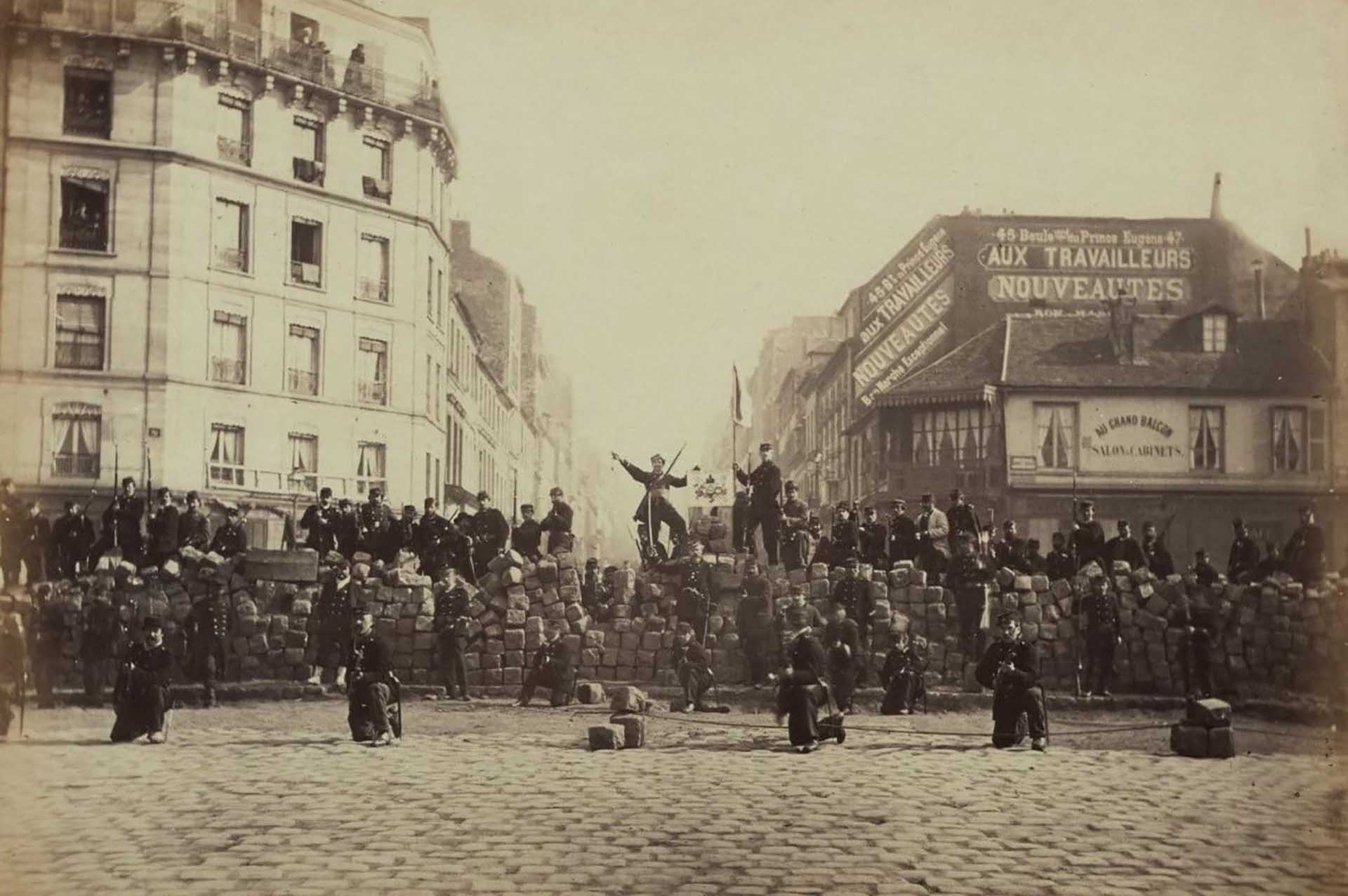
A barricade during the Paris Commune of 1871. Marx analysed the Commune as a historical example of the proletariat attempting to create a new form of social organisation, a potential "historical transformation."

While Capital is primarily a theoretical analysis of the economic laws of motion of capitalism, class struggle is an immanent and recurring theme. The capital-labour relation is inherently antagonistic, centred on the extraction of surplus-value. The length of the working day, the intensity of labour, the level of wages (value of labour-power), and the introduction of machinery are all sites of ongoing struggle between the capitalist class and the working class. While the text does not focus extensively on trade unions or workers' organisations, it analyses them as necessary centres of resistance against the "encroachments of capital". The reproduction of capitalist relations of distribution (wages, profits, rents) constantly reproduces the material preconditions for this class struggle and for class solidarity on both sides.

Marx views capitalism as a historically specific and transitory mode of production. Its internal contradictions – between the social character of production and private appropriation, between the development of productive forces and existing relations of production, between use-value and exchange-value – create the conditions for its eventual supersession. The process of accumulation itself, by concentrating capital and socialising labour, creates the material prerequisites and the social agent (the proletariat) for a revolutionary transformation towards a "higher form of society", an "association of free men" where production is consciously regulated by the associated producers. The theory of capitalism's collapse is not one of automatic economic breakdown but of conscious revolutionary overthrow, enabled by growing economic contradictions but requiring the organised action of the proletariat—what later Marxists termed the "subjective factor". For Marx, the proletariat is not merely the revolutionary subject but is integral to the structure of capital itself; thus, the abolition of capital must also mean the "self-abolition" of the proletariat, rather than its realisation or glorification.

While Marx offers few details about the nature of communist society, he emphasises the abolition of private property in the means of production, commodity exchange, money, and value production itself, in favour of a system of production based on freely associated labour and the satisfaction of human needs. For Marx, socialism was not merely a welfare society, but "the abolition of the estrangement between man and the world, the assimilation of the world by the human subject."

== Publication and translation ==
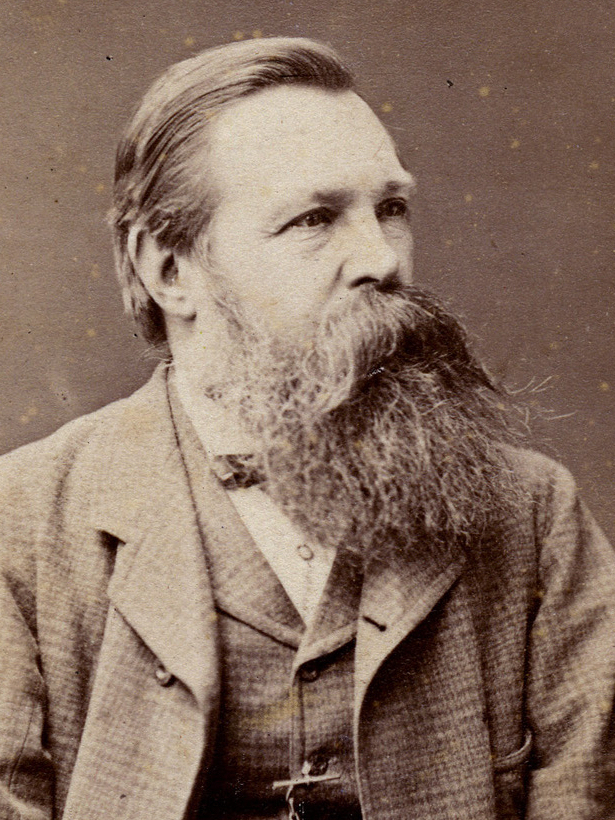
Friedrich Engels (in 1877), Marx's collaborator who edited and published Volumes II and III of Capital after his death

Marx delivered the German manuscript for Volume I to his publisher Otto Meissner in Hamburg in April 1867, and it was published in September. Meissner expected the next two volumes before the end of that year, a timeline Marx was initially optimistic about, though his meticulous approach often led to delays that frustrated his associates, including his lifelong collaborator and friend Friedrich Engels, who had been urging him for decades to finish the work. The initial reception to the first volume in Germany was muted, much to Marx's frustration. Engels attempted to generate publicity by submitting hostile pseudonymous reviews to German newspapers, and urged Marx's friends to discuss the book "over and over again, in any way whatsoever". It took four years for the first edition of 1,000 copies to sell out. A revised second German edition of Volume I was published in instalments from 1872 to 1873. This was the last version published in the original German that Marx personally revised and authorised.

Marx continued to work on the manuscripts for the subsequent volumes until his death in 1883, but he did not complete them for publication. Engels took on the immense task of editing and preparing these manuscripts. Volume II was published by Engels in 1885, and Volume III in 1894. Engels faced significant challenges in this endeavour, as Marx's manuscripts were often fragmentary, disorganised, and in various stages of completion. For Volume II, Engels had to work from multiple drafts and construct a coherent text. The task was even more formidable for Volume III, where, for some crucial parts, particularly on credit and finance, Marx had left behind little more than "a disordered jumble of notes, comments and extract material". Engels's editorial interventions, while aimed at faithfully presenting Marx's thought, have been a subject of scholarly discussion, particularly concerning the structure and in some cases the content of Volumes II and III. Theories of Surplus Value, often considered the fourth volume of Capital, was edited by Karl Kautsky from Marx's manuscripts of the 1860s and published between 1905 and 1910.

The first translation of Volume I into another language was the Russian edition, which appeared in the spring of 1872. Despite Tsarist censors passing it on the grounds that its complex arguments had "no application to Russia" and thus "couldn't be subversive", most of the 3,000-copy print run sold out within a year. Marx, who had "fought for twenty-five years" against Russian influence, found it an "irony of fate" that "the Russians... always want to be my patrons". This led Marx, who had previously paid little attention to Russia, to reconsider its revolutionary potential and engage with Narodnik thinkers like his translator Nikolai Danielson. In correspondence with Vera Zasulich in 1881, Marx clarified that his theory of the historical inevitability of the bourgeois phase was "expressly limited to the countries of Western Europe", suggesting Russia's rural commune might follow a different path. The architects of the 1917 Russian Revolution, including Vladimir Lenin and Leon Trotsky, would later cite Capital as a key theoretical foundation.

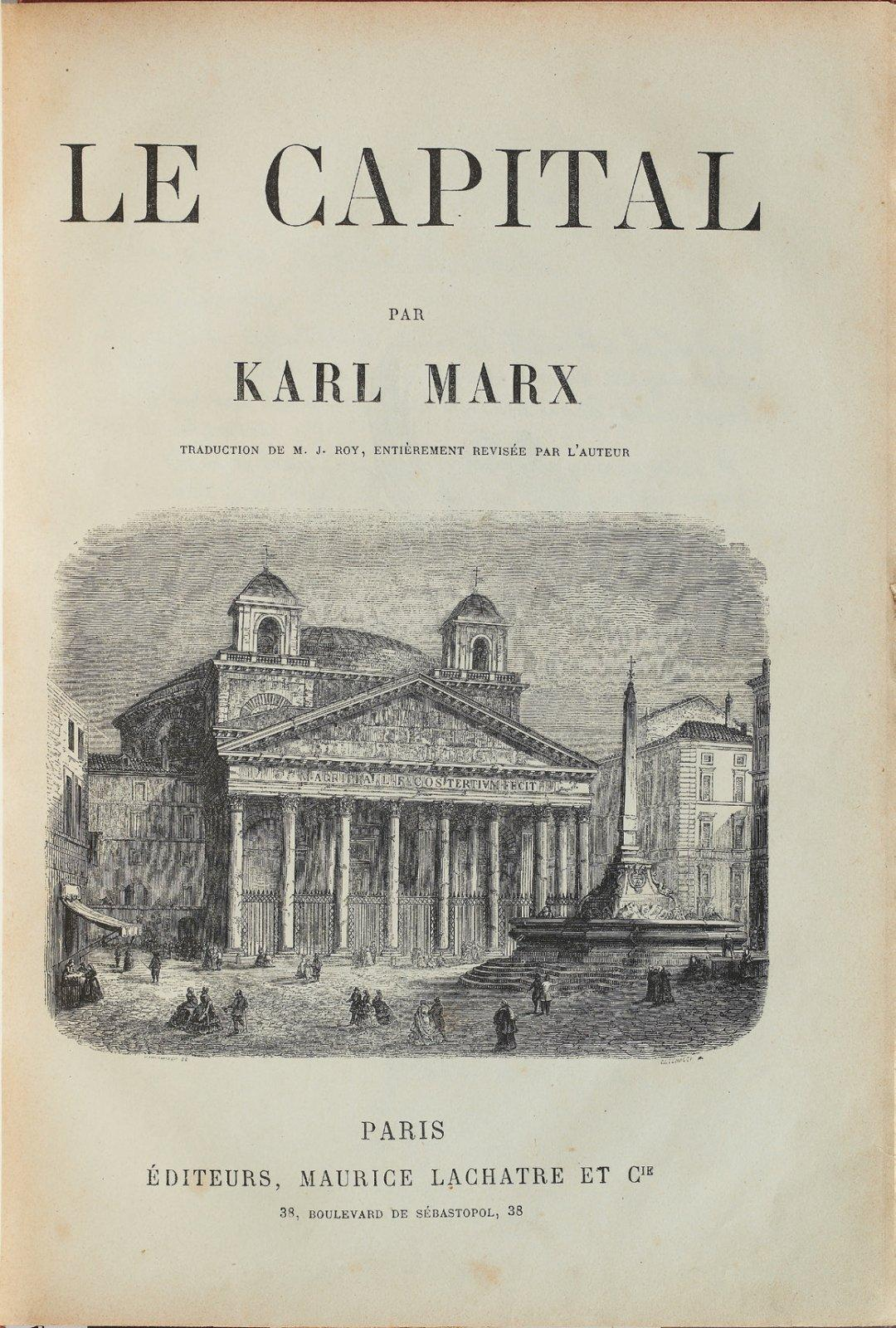
Title page of the 1875 French edition of Capital

The French edition of Volume I, published in instalments between 1872 and 1875, was the last version revised by Marx and the one he regarded as definitive. After work began in 1867, five translators were tried and rejected before Marx approved Joseph Roy, a Bordeaux schoolteacher. Marx found his translation often too literal and was "compelled to rewrite whole passages in French, to make them palatable". The extensive rewriting and revisions produced a work which Marx stated possessed "a scientific value independent of the original and should be consulted even by readers familiar with German". He intended this version to serve as the basis for all future translations, including a planned revision of the German text. However, Engels held reservations about the French text, believing the language lacked the "depth" and "vigor" of the German original. Consequently, after Marx's death, Engels based his third (1883) and fourth (1890) German editions primarily on the second German edition, incorporating only some of the changes from the French version.

The first English translation of Volume I, by Samuel Moore and Edward Aveling (Marx's son-in-law) and edited by Engels, was published in Britain in 1887, four years after Marx's death. It was based on Engels's third German edition of 1883. The publisher Macmillan & Co. had previously declined to publish an English translation during Marx's lifetime. Subsequent English translations of all three volumes have appeared, most notably the Ben Fowkes translation of Volume I (1976) and the David Fernbach translations of Volume II (1978) and Volume III (1981), published by Penguin Books in association with New Left Review. Fowkes's translation was based on the fourth German edition of 1890, also edited by Engels. These translations are widely used in English-speaking academia. In 2024, Princeton University Press published a new translation of Volume I by Paul Reitter, the first in English to be based on the second German edition (1872).

As of 2025, Capital has been translated into 72 languages, often multiple times. The Marx-Engels-Gesamtausgabe (MEGA), an ongoing scholarly project, aims to publish all of Marx's and Engels's writings in their original languages, including the various manuscript versions of Capital, providing an invaluable resource for detailed textual analysis.

== Reception and influence ==
Capital has had a profound and far-reaching influence on subsequent intellectual, political, and social history. Its impact extends across numerous disciplines, including economics, sociology, political science, philosophy, history, literary criticism, and cultural studies. Over time, different political movements—from social democrats and communists to anti-colonialists—have developed distinct interpretations of the work to analyse their contemporary conditions and legitimise their political strategies.

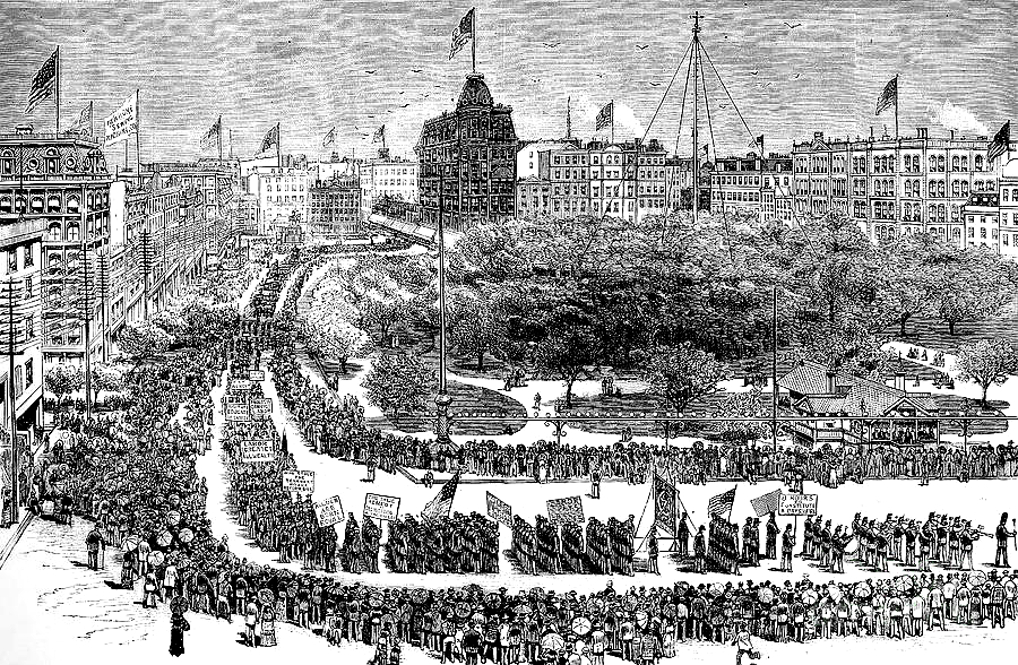
Labor Day demonstration in New York City, 1882. Capital became a foundational text for socialist and workers' movements.

Within the workers' movement and socialist political parties of the late 19th and early 20th centuries, Capital (often in simplified or popularised forms) became a foundational text, providing a theoretical basis for the critique of capitalism and the struggle for socialism. In Britain, the explicitly Marxist Social Democratic Federation (SDF) was founded in 1881 by Henry Hyndman, drawing members such as William Morris and Marx's daughter Eleanor Marx. The SDF's influence prompted a young George Bernard Shaw to study the work in 1883, an experience he described as a "revelation" that "gave me an entirely fresh conception of the universe, provided me with a purpose and a mission in life." However, Shaw had little success in converting fellow members of the Fabian Society to his enthusiasm, and the Fabians, under Sidney Webb, largely steered British socialism away from Marxist ideas of class war. The British Labour Party, formed in 1900, was often said to owe more to Methodism than to Marx, although it did acknowledge a debt to him in a 1947 reprint of The Communist Manifesto.

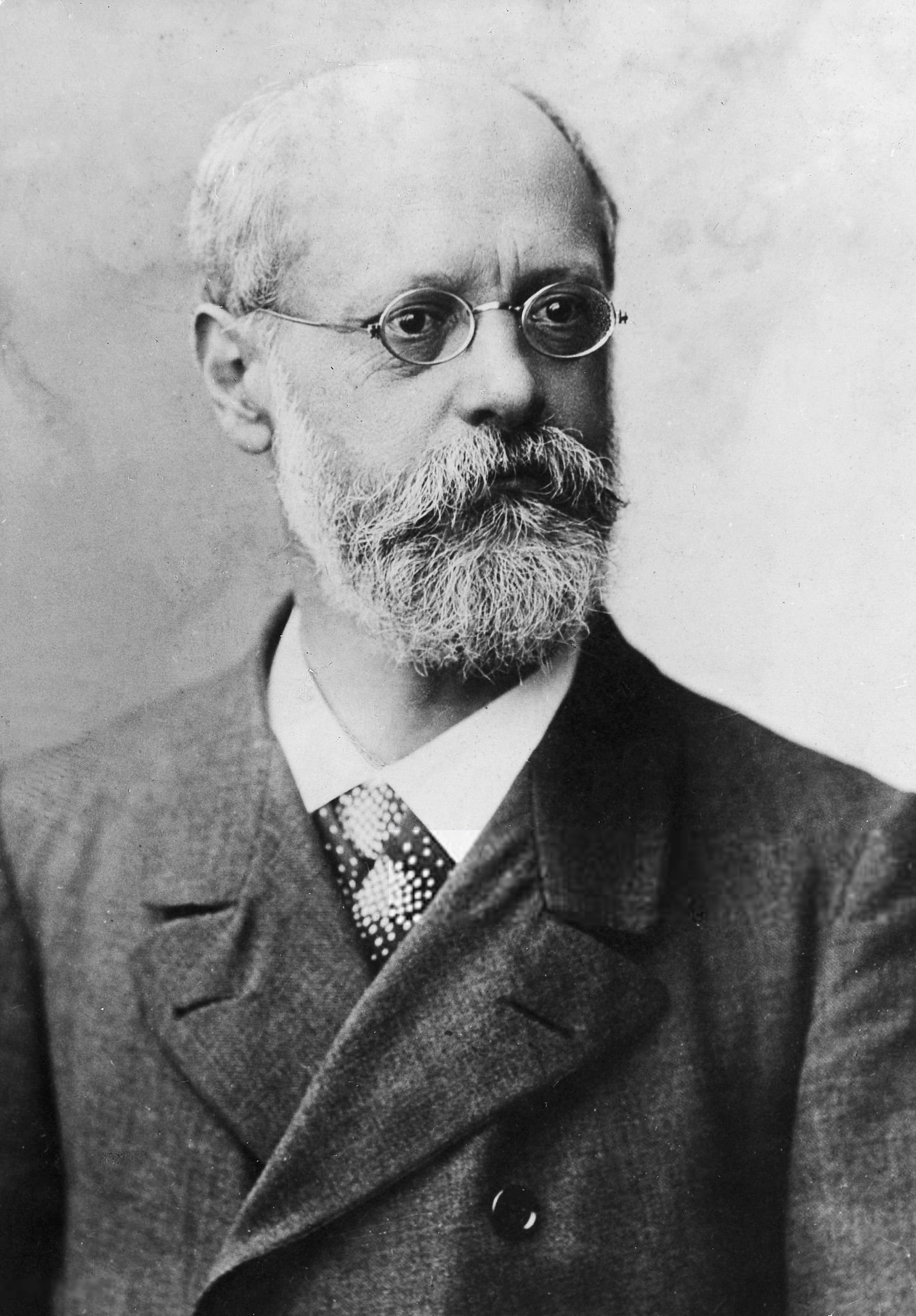
Karl Kautsky, who shaped orthodox Marxism

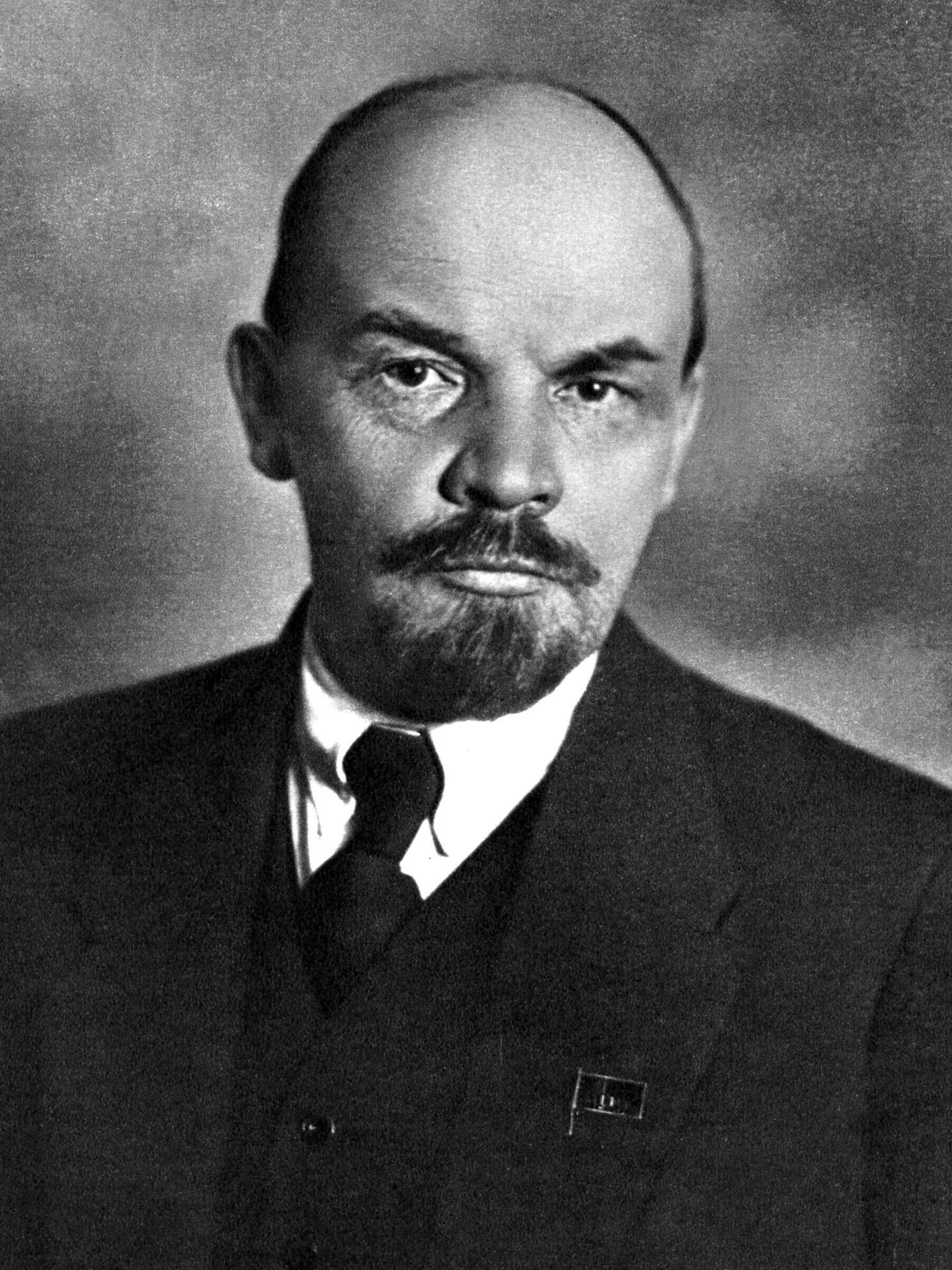
Vladimir Lenin, who shaped Marxism–Leninism

In Germany, Marx's ideas became the official ideology of the Social Democratic Party (SPD) at its 1891 Erfurt Congress. However, the Erfurt Programme itself reflected a tension: one section, drafted by Marx's disciple Karl Kautsky, restated theories from Capital, while another, by Eduard Bernstein (influenced by Fabianism), focused on immediate, reformist political objectives. Bernstein later openly repudiated much of Marx's legacy, arguing that capitalism could endure and bring increased prosperity if properly regulated. Kautsky played a significant role in disseminating what became known as "orthodox Marxism" within the Second International, heavily influenced by Engels's interpretations and his later works like Anti-Dühring. In this view, Capital was part of a comprehensive, scientific system that included a philosophy of nature (dialectical materialism) and a deterministic theory of history (historical materialism), culminating in the inevitable collapse of capitalism and the triumph of the proletariat.

The next generation of "orthodox" Marxists, including Rosa Luxemburg, Rudolf Hilferding, and Vladimir Lenin, sought to build on and develop Capital. Luxemburg's The Accumulation of Capital (1913) was an attempt to rethink its categorial system on a world scale, while Hilferding's Finance Capital (1910) was a full-scale "up-dating" of the work to account for the rise of trusts and monopolies. Lenin's interpretation, particularly his theory of imperialism as the "highest stage of capitalism", further shaped the development of Marxism–Leninism, which became the official ideology of the Soviet Union and many communist parties worldwide following the October Revolution of 1917. The revolution itself was famously described by Antonio Gramsci as a "revolution against Capital", in that it occurred in agrarian Russia rather than an advanced industrial nation, seemingly defying the historical stages outlined in Marx's work. In the Soviet context, Marx's critique of political economy was often repurposed as a "guidebook for industrialisation" and served to legitimise the political domination of the party in a dogmatic system that discouraged critical inquiry.

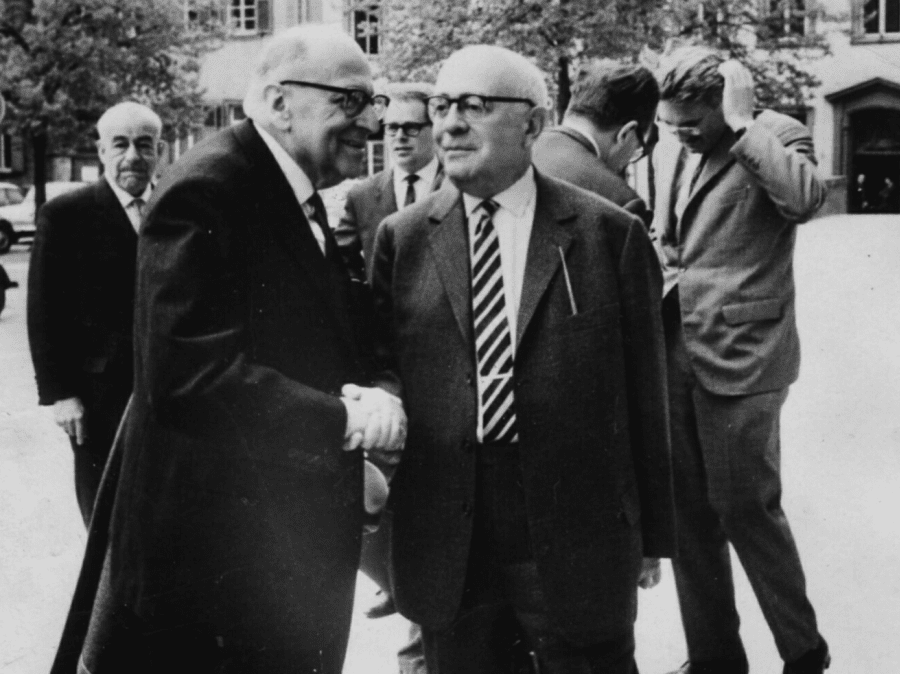
Max Horkheimer (front left) and Theodor W. Adorno (front right), key members of the Frankfurt School that developed critical theory by drawing heavily on Marxian concepts

Following the failure of proletarian revolutions in Western Europe after World War I and the rise of Stalinism, a new intellectual tradition of Western Marxism emerged. This tradition was characterised by a structural divorce from political practice and a shift in the centre of gravity of Marxist theory from economics and politics towards philosophy, methodology, and culture. Thinkers such as Georg Lukács, Karl Korsch, Gramsci, and the members of the Frankfurt School (e.g., Theodor W. Adorno, Max Horkheimer, Herbert Marcuse) often emphasised the philosophical and critical-cultural dimensions of Marx's thought, focusing on themes like reification, alienation, ideology, and the critique of instrumental reason. In post-war France, this critical tradition took a humanist and existentialist turn with thinkers like Jean-Paul Sartre. In response to the theoretical rigidity of Stalinism, he rejected the "scientistic" interpretation and the idea of "iron laws" of history, emphasising instead the role of human consciousness, subjectivity, and creative practice.

A major counter-movement to this humanist interpretation emerged in the 1960s with the "structural Marxism" of Louis Althusser. Althusser and his followers argued that Marx's work contained a radical "epistemological break", positing a sharp division between the "ideological" and humanist works of the young Marx and the mature, "scientific" theory of Capital. Through a "symptomatic reading" of the text to uncover its underlying theoretical structures, Althusser's project aimed to re-establish Capital as a work of science, distinct from and opposed to bourgeois ideologies such as humanism, empiricism, and Hegelian historicism. In contrast to the philosophical turn of much of Western Marxism, other traditions continued to engage directly with the economic analysis of Capital. The tradition associated with Leon Trotsky, for example, concentrated on political and economic questions; a key later work in this lineage, Ernest Mandel's Late Capitalism (1972), was the first major theoretical analysis of the post-war capitalist mode of production within the Marxist framework.

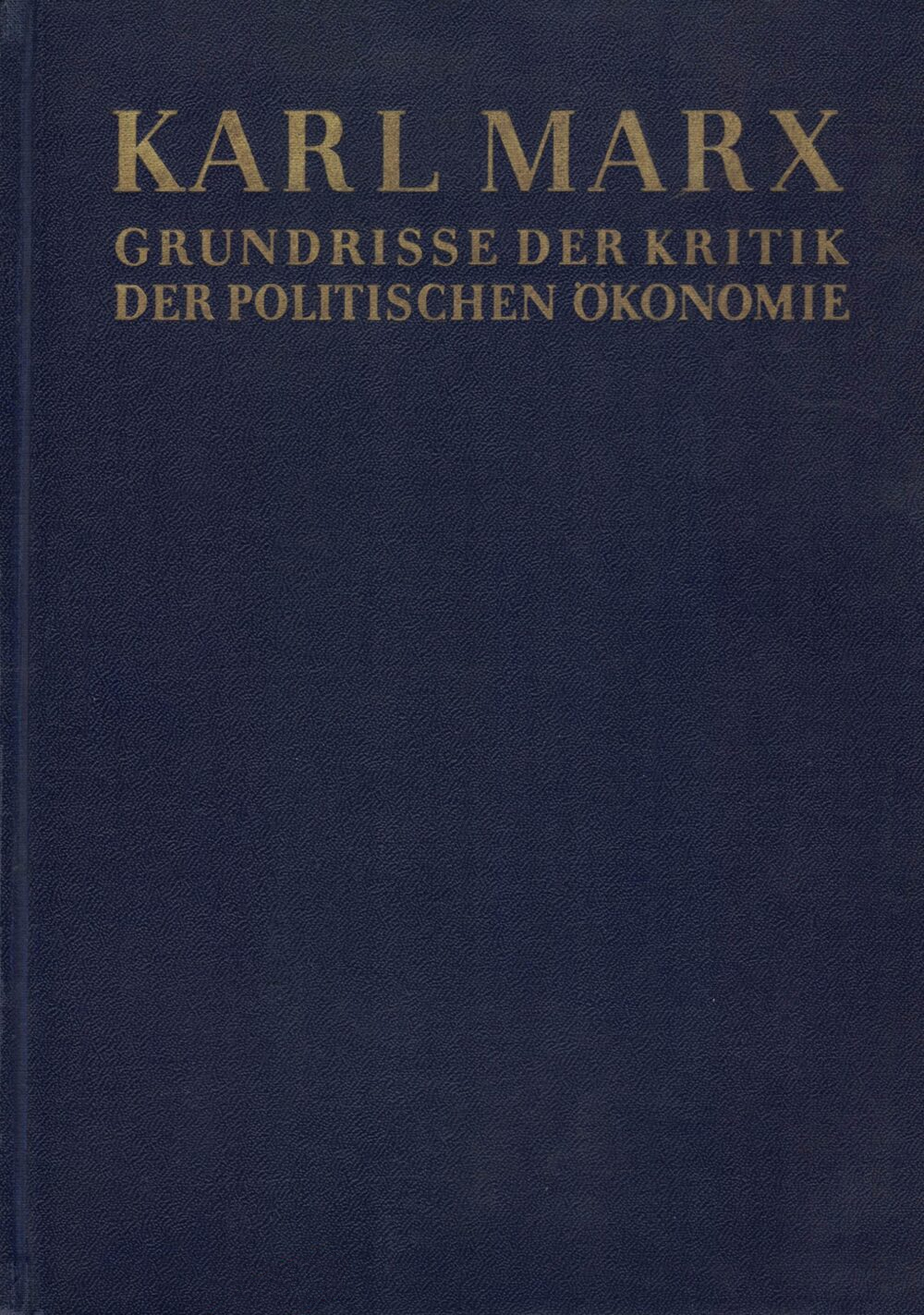
Cover of the 1953 German edition of the Grundrisse, Marx's preparatory notebooks for Capital. Not widely published until the mid-20th century, their appearance spurred new critical readings of his magnum opus.

In the latter half of the 20th century, the rediscovery and publication of Marx's unpublished manuscripts, particularly the Grundrisse, spurred new interpretive traditions that challenged the orthodoxies of both Marxism–Leninism and social democracy. An early, foundational commentary on the Grundrisse by Roman Rosdolsky (first published in 1968) was influential in this turn, re-emphasising the importance of Hegel's dialectic for understanding Marx's method. In West Germany, the Neue Marx-Lektüre ("New Reading of Marx") developed from the 1960s, initiated by students of Adorno such as Hans-Georg Backhaus and Helmut Reichelt. This school sought to reconstruct Marx's critique by emphasising its esoteric content—the monetary character of his value theory and the critique of the value-form and commodity fetishism—over the exoteric content that presented him as a superior classical economist.

In Italy, the operaismo ("workerist") movement also turned to the Grundrisse, but for a "militant" political reading that privileged it over Capital. Thinkers like Mario Tronti and Antonio Negri inverted the traditional Marxist focus, arguing that working-class struggle is the primary motor of capitalist development, to which capital must constantly react and adapt. This "political reading" of Capital and other texts sought to understand them as weapons in the class struggle, revealing the dynamics of capital from the perspective of workers' autonomy. This tradition evolved into autonomist Marxism, which critiques "one-sided" Marxist schools for treating the working class as a passive victim of capital's objective "laws of motion" and redefines the working class to include the unwaged.

A further major interpretive shift came with Moishe Postone's Time, Labor, and Social Domination (1993), which builds on these critical traditions to offer a fundamental reinterpretation of Capital. Postone, and the related German school of Wertkritik (value-critique), argue that "traditional Marxism"—which he defines broadly as interpretations that focus on class exploitation and private property—misreads the core of Marx's critique. He distinguishes this traditional "critique of capitalism from the standpoint of labour" from what he sees as Marx's more profound "critique of labour in capitalism", in which the fundamental problem is not simply the market or private ownership, but the historically unique, socially mediating role of labour itself. This form of labour (abstract labour) constitutes an impersonal, quasi-objective system of abstract domination, embodied in the category of capital as a self-moving, alienated "Subject". From this perspective, the goal of a post-capitalist society is not the "realisation" of labour or the proletariat, but the abolition of proletarian labour, the value-form of wealth, and the abstract, treadmill-like historical dynamic that labour as a social mediation generates.

In academic economics, Marx's work has had a more ambivalent reception. While mainstream neoclassical economics largely dismissed or ignored Marx, his theories have been influential in heterodox economics, particularly in Marxian economics. Debates surrounding the labour theory of value, the transformation problem, crisis theory (particularly the tendency of the rate of profit to fall), and the nature of capitalist accumulation have been central to Marxian economic thought. In sociology, Capital has been a key source for theories of social class, class conflict, and the historical development of capitalism. While some sociological traditions have sought to refute or revise Marx's class analysis, his work remains a fundamental reference point for understanding social stratification and the dynamics of capitalist societies. The influence of Capital has also extended to post-structuralist and post-modernist thought, with thinkers like Michel Foucault and Jacques Derrida engaging with Marx's concepts, albeit often critically and in ways that depart significantly from traditional Marxist interpretations. Concepts such as fetishism and the critique of power have resonated in these traditions.

Despite the collapse of the Soviet Union in 1991 and the decline of traditional communist parties, Marx's critique of capitalism as articulated in Capital has experienced periodic revivals, particularly during times of economic crisis. The 2008 financial crisis, for instance, led to a renewed interest in Marx's analysis of the inherent contradictions and crisis tendencies of capitalism. Contemporary discussions on globalisation, inequality, financialisation, and environmental crisis often draw upon or engage with the themes and categories developed in Capital.

== Criticism ==
Capital has been subject to extensive criticism from various perspectives since its publication. These criticisms target its foundational concepts, methods, empirical claims, and political implications.

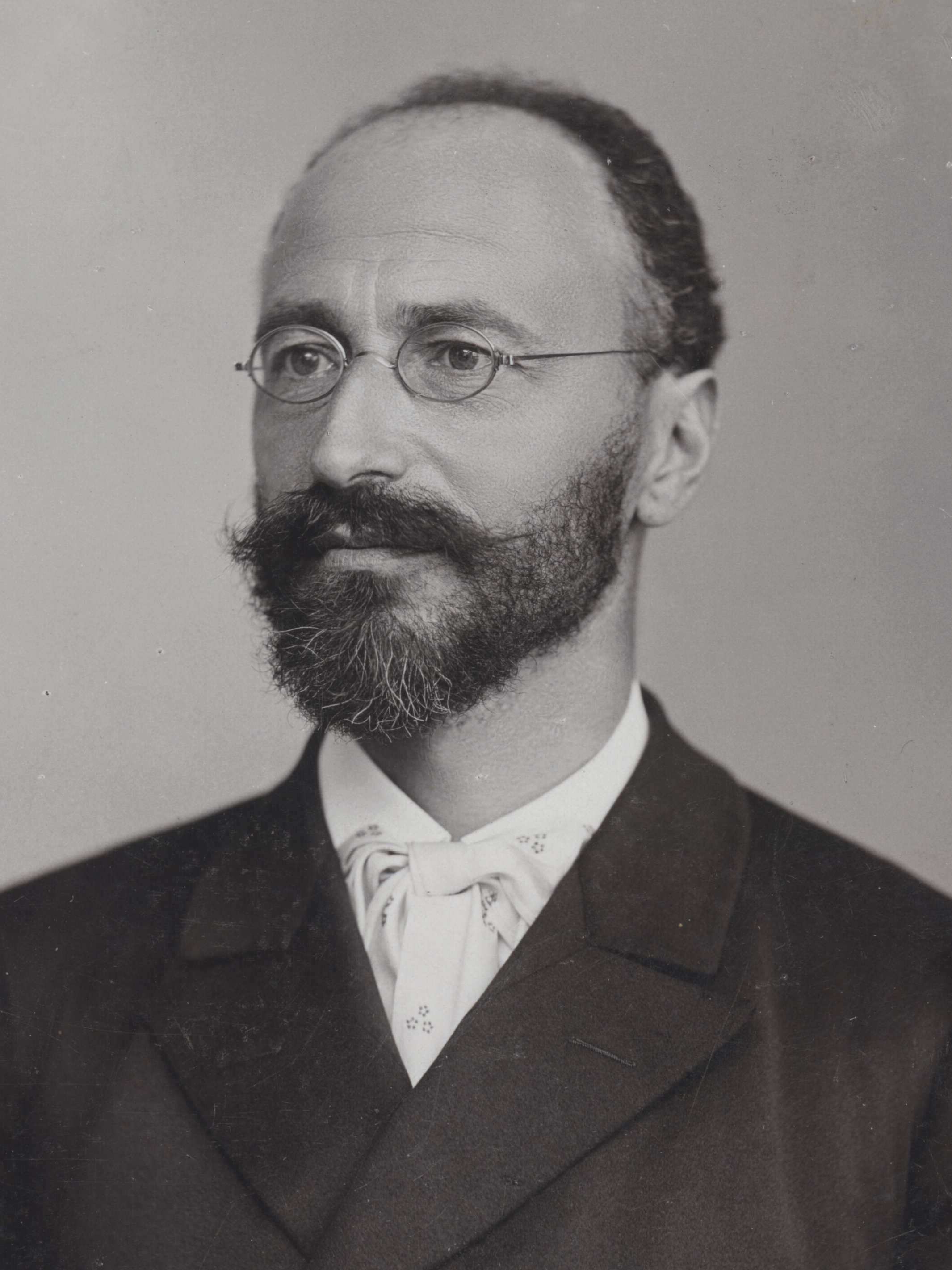
Eugen von Böhm-Bawerk, an early critic of Marxist theory and key member of the Austrian school of economics who wrote Karl Marx and the Close of His System (1896)

One of the most persistent and fundamental criticisms concerns the labour theory of value (LTV). Mainstream neoclassical economics, which emerged in the late 19th century, rejected the LTV in favour of a subjective theory of value based on marginal utility. Critics argue that value is determined by individual preferences and scarcity, not by the socially necessary labour-time embodied in commodities. They point to the difficulty of empirically measuring value as defined by Marx and argue that the LTV fails to adequately explain relative prices in a complex market economy. The "transformation problem"—the issue of how abstract labour values are transformed into concrete market prices of production—has been a central focus of this critique, with many economists arguing that Marx failed to provide a logically consistent solution. Other interpreters counter these criticisms by arguing that Marx's theory is not a "labour theory of wealth" (which would be vulnerable to such empirical critiques) but a critical social theory of value as a historically specific form of mediation. For them, the "transformation problem" is not a mathematical error but a necessary mystification arising from the contradictory nature of value itself. From another perspective, Leszek Kołakowski argued that the LTV is not a testable scientific hypothesis but should be understood as a "philosophic anthropology" or a form of "social metaphysics", intended as a critique of the dehumanisation inherent in a market society.

The tendency of the rate of profit to fall (TRPF) has been another major area of criticism. Economists have questioned both the theoretical derivation of the law and its empirical validity. Critics argue that Marx underestimated the strength and variety of counteracting tendencies, such as technological innovations that cheapen constant capital, increases in the rate of surplus-value, or the expansion of new, more profitable sectors. Empirical studies on long-term movements in the rate of profit have yielded mixed and often contradictory results, making it difficult to definitively confirm or refute Marx's "law". The Sraffian economist Nobuo Okishio famously developed a theorem purporting to show that, under conditions of competitive innovation, the rate of profit must rise. Kołakowski suggested that the alleged law was "no more than an expression of Marx's hope that capitalism would be destroyed by its own inconsistencies".

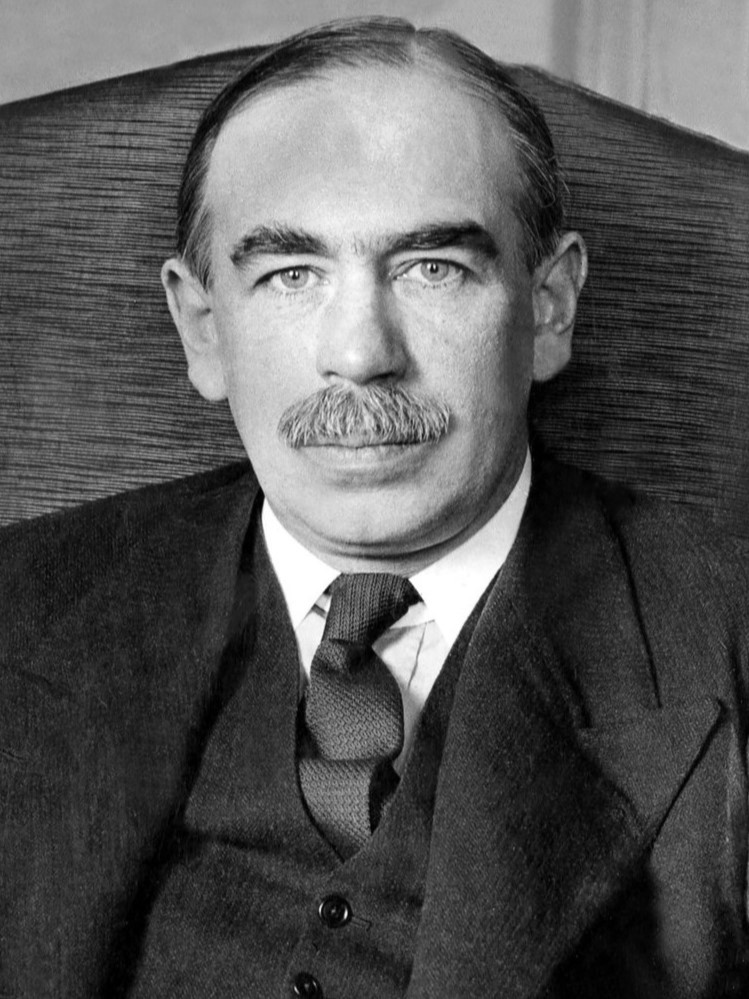
John Maynard Keynes. While not a Marxist, Keynes engaged with problems Marx identified, such as crises of overproduction and the role of effective demand.

Marx's theory of crisis has also been challenged. While he identified several potential sources of crisis (overproduction, underconsumption, falling rate of profit, financial instability), critics argue that he did not provide a single, coherent theory of why crises are inevitable under capitalism. Some, like John Maynard Keynes, while acknowledging capitalism's inherent instability, proposed solutions within a reformed capitalist framework, contrasting with Marx's revolutionary conclusions. The historical experience of post-war capitalism, particularly the long boom of the 1950s and 1960s, was seen by some as a refutation of Marx's predictions of ever-deepening crises, while the significant rise in the material standard of living of the working class in many advanced capitalist countries was offered as evidence against the immiseration of the proletariat. While many Marxists have reinterpreted immiseration in relative rather than absolute terms (i.e., a declining share of wealth for labour even if absolute living standards rise), the predictive power of Marx's historical trajectory has been questioned. The resilience and adaptability of capitalism, its capacity to overcome crises and reinvent itself, are often cited as undermining Marx's revolutionary prognosis.

Marx's methodology has also faced criticism. His use of dialectics is often dismissed by analytical philosophers and mainstream social scientists as obscure, unscientific, or unfalsifiable. The high level of abstraction in Capital, while intended by Marx to reveal underlying structures, is seen by some critics as detached from empirical reality and leading to overly general or untestable propositions. The unfinished nature of the work, particularly Volumes II and III, and the editorial role of Engels, have also led to debates about the consistency and coherence of Marx's overall argument.

A significant line of feminist critique has focused on what Capital leaves out. Critics like Silvia Federici have argued that Marx's analysis of capitalism is conducted from a masculine viewpoint, focusing on the industrial waged worker while largely ignoring the crucial role of women's unpaid domestic and reproductive labour in producing and maintaining labour-power. By naturalising domestic work and placing the reproduction of the worker in the sphere of private consumption rather than production, Marx's work, according to this critique, fails to see the strategic importance of this sphere for both capitalist development and anti-capitalist struggle. While acknowledging that his method provided powerful tools for later feminist theory, these critics contend that a feminist anti-capitalist perspective must go beyond Marx's theoretical framework.

The ecological implications of Marx's work have also been a source of criticism. Some early environmental thinkers and ecosocialists criticised Capital for its apparent "Prometheanism"—an uncritical celebration of industrialisation and the "subjection of Nature's forces to man" that seemed to ignore ecological limits. These critics argue that Marx's focus on the development of productive forces reflects a productivist bias that is insensitive to the environmental consequences of large-scale industry. However, a second wave of ecosocialist scholarship, drawing on a more detailed reading of the text and Marx's notebooks, has challenged this interpretation. These scholars argue that Marx's concept of the "metabolic rift" provides a sophisticated ecological critique of capitalism, demonstrating how the drive for accumulation necessarily disrupts the fundamental relationship between humanity and nature. This reading suggests that far from ignoring ecological limits, Marx's later work increasingly recognised them as a central contradiction of the capitalist mode of production.

Finally, the political implications of Capital and its association with 20th-century communist states have been a major source of criticism. The failures and atrocities of these regimes are often used to discredit Marx's theories, arguing that his ideas inevitably lead to totalitarianism and economic inefficiency. While many Marxists distinguish between Marx's own thought and the practices of "actually existing socialism", the historical legacy of Marxism–Leninism has undeniably affected the reception and critique of Capital. Some argue that the Soviet Union and other communist states represented a form of state capitalism rather than socialism because they retained the essential structures of value, commodity production, and abstract labour, merely replacing market mechanisms with state planning.

== Legacy ==
Capital stands as one of the most influential and controversial books ever written. Its legacy is multifaceted, shaping intellectual discourse, political movements, and the historical trajectory of the 20th and 21st centuries.

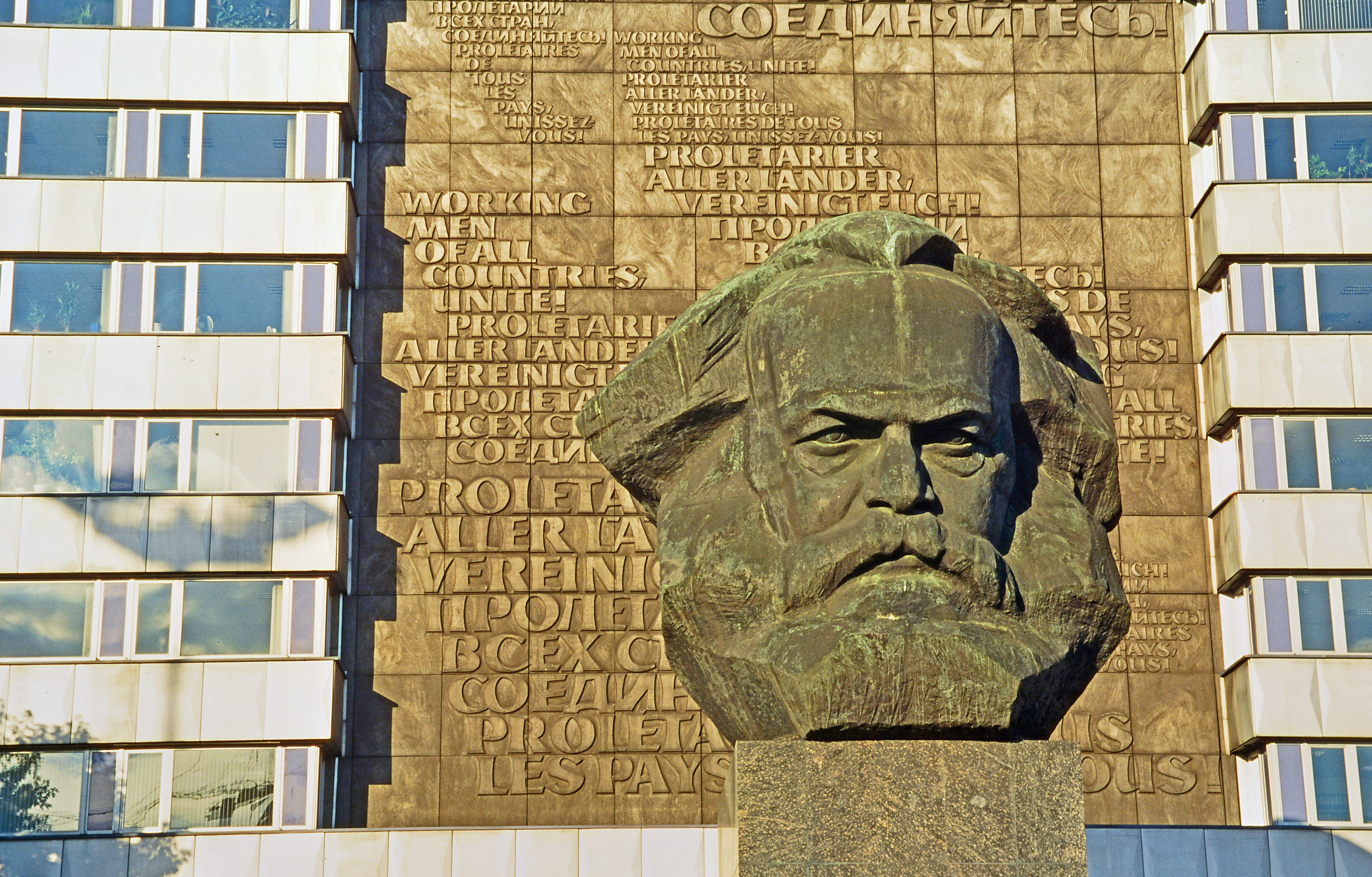
The Karl Marx Monument in Chemnitz, erected in East Germany in 1971

Its most direct impact has been on socialist and communist movements worldwide. Capital provided a powerful theoretical framework for critiquing capitalism, explaining exploitation, and advocating for a revolutionary overthrow of the bourgeois order. It became a canonical text for numerous political parties and revolutionary leaders, inspiring struggles for workers' rights, national liberation, and the establishment of socialist states. The interpretation and application of Marx's ideas, however, varied widely and often became subjects of intense debate and sectarian division within these movements.

In academia, Capital has had a profound and lasting influence on the social sciences and humanities. Marxian economics emerged as a distinct school of thought, engaging with and developing Marx's categories to analyse capitalist dynamics, crises, and long-term development. In sociology, Marx's work is foundational to conflict theory, class analysis, and the study of social stratification and historical change. Political science, history, philosophy, literary criticism, and cultural studies have all been significantly impacted by Marxist concepts such as ideology, hegemony, alienation, reification, and the critique of power. The Frankfurt School, Western Marxism, post-structuralism, and post-colonial theory are among the many intellectual currents that have engaged deeply with Marx's legacy.

Capital has also shaped the understanding of capitalism itself, even among its defenders. Marx's analysis of the inherent dynamism, contradictions, and crisis tendencies of the capitalist mode of production has forced subsequent economic and social thought to grapple with these issues. Concepts he pioneered, such as the reserve army of labour, the concentration and centralisation of capital, and the role of technological change, remain relevant for understanding contemporary capitalism. His work highlighted the social and historical specificity of capitalism, challenging notions of its eternal or natural character.

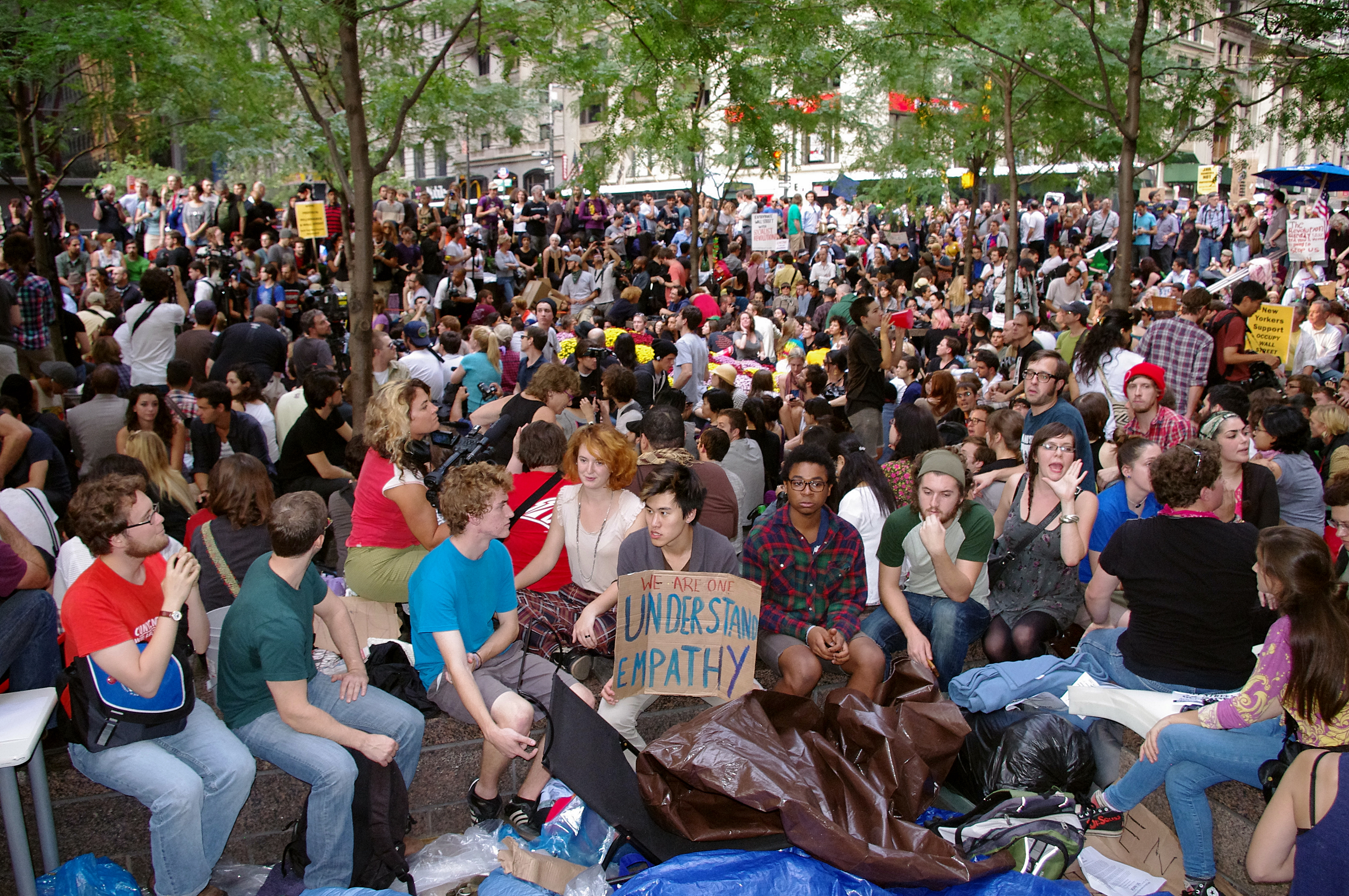
The Occupy Wall Street encampment in Zuccotti Park, New York City, 2011. Marx's critique of capitalism and its inherent inequalities continues to find resonance in contemporary social movements.

The historical experience of the 20th century, particularly the rise and fall of Soviet-style communist states and the evolution of welfare-state capitalism, has led to ongoing reinterpretations and revisions of Marx's theories. The collapse of the Soviet Union in 1991 was widely seen by some as the definitive failure of Marxism. However, subsequent economic crises, growing global inequality, and the challenges of globalisation have led to periodic revivals of interest in Capital as a tool for understanding the contemporary world. As Francis Wheen notes, even in the post–Cold War era, journalists for The Economist and financial speculators like George Soros have acknowledged the "startlingly relevant" insights of Marx's analysis of globalisation and its inherent instability. Contemporary defences of the relevance of Marx's critique often focus on the persistence of the capital-labour antagonism in the production process, in opposition to theories of a "post-industrial" or "cognitive" capitalism where value creation has supposedly moved beyond the factory.

The unfinished nature of Marx's project, particularly the incomplete state of Volumes II and III and the vast scope of his intended critique, has left a legacy of ongoing scholarly work to reconstruct, interpret, and extend his analysis. Debates continue over the precise meaning and contemporary relevance of key concepts, the internal consistency of his arguments, and the applicability of his 19th-century analysis to 21st-century capitalism. Despite these ongoing debates and criticisms, Capital remains a vital and indispensable resource for anyone seeking to understand the historical dynamics, social consequences, and inherent contradictions of the capitalist mode of production. Its central message—that capitalism is a historically specific, exploitative, and crisis-prone system—continues to resonate with those critical of existing social and economic orders.

In 2013, UNESCO admitted Marx's annotated first edition of Capital Volume I to its Memory of the World International Register, along with a manuscript page from The Communist Manifesto. These papers are held at the International Institute of Social History in Amsterdam.

== See also ==
- Base and superstructure
- Capital in the Twenty-First Century
- Criticism of capitalism
- Economic determinism
- The General Theory of Employment, Interest and Money
- The German Ideology
- History of economic thought
- Human Action
- Marginalism
- On the Principles of Political Economy and Taxation
- The Poverty of Philosophy
- The Protestant Ethic and the Spirit of Capitalism
- The Wealth of Nations
- Progress and Poverty
- Wage Labour and Capital
- World-systems theory
