= Abbiategrasso (Italian Chamber of Deputies constituency) =

Defunct electoral district in Italy

- Former constituency for the Chamber of Deputies
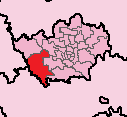
- Abbiategrasso constituency in the Province of Milan (1994–2001)
- District: Metropolitan City of Milan
- Region: Lombardy
- Major settlements: Abbiategrasso

Former constituency
- Created: 1993
- Abolished: 2005
- Seats: 1

Abbiategrasso was a single-member constituency of the Italian Republic which was used for the election of the Chamber of Deputies, the lower house of the Italian Parliament. It belonged to the Lombardy 1 multi-member district and was used in the 1994, 1996 and 2001 general elections. It was used to elect a deputy (MP) in the XII, XIII and XIV legislatures.

== History ==
The constituency was established in 1993 with the so-called Mattarella Law (Law no. 277, New Rules for the Election of the Chamber of Deputies), implemented following the 1993 abrogative referendum. The law established a mixed electoral system for the Chamber of Deputies and the Senate of the Republic, partly majoritarian and partly proportional. Seventy-five percent of the assembly's members were elected in single-member constituencies through first-past-the-post voting with the remaining 25% of the Chamber of Deputies being elected through a proportional system using party lists.

The constituency was abolished, along with all the others that constituted the Chamber, with the promulgation of the subsequent electoral law, the so-called Calderoli Law. This provided for a proportional system with a majority bonus, which was awarded to the Chamber at the national level.

== Boundaries ==
The Abbiategrasso constituency was one of the 74 single-member constituencies into which Lombardy was divided and, as provided for by the Legislative Decree of 20 December 1993 n. 536. It was entirely contained in the province of Milan and included the following municipalities: Abbiategrasso, Albairate, Bareggio, Besate, Cassinetta di Lugagnano, Corbetta, Gudo Visconti, Magenta, Morimondo, Motta Visconti, Ozzero, Robecco sul Naviglio, Rosate, Sedriano, Vermezzo, Vittuone and Zelo Surrigone.

== Deputies ==
Election	Member of Parliament	Party	Alliance	Ref.
1994	Franca Valenti	Lega Nord	Pole of Freedoms	
1996	Giovanni Deodato	Forza Italia	Pole for Freedoms	
2001	Giovanni Deodato	Forza Italia	House of Freedoms	

== Elections ==
=== 1994 ===
==== Proportional results ====
Coalitions	Lists	Votes	%
Pole of Freedoms	Forza Italia	24,883	27.33
Pole of Freedoms	Lega Nord	18,100	19.88
Pole of Freedoms	Total Coalition	42,983	47.21
Alliance of Progressives	Democratic Party of the Left	12,359	13.57
Alliance of Progressives	Communist Refoundation Party	5,178	5.69
Alliance of Progressives	Federation of the Greens	2,369	2.60
Alliance of Progressives	Italian Socialist Party	1,394	1.53
Alliance of Progressives	Democratic Alliance	1,048	1.15
Alliance of Progressives	The Network	1,045	1.15
Alliance of Progressives	Total Coalition	23,393	25.69
Pact for Italy	Italian People's Party	9,794	10.76
Pact for Italy	Segni Pact	3,470	3.81
Pact for Italy	Total Coalition	13,264	14.57
National Alliance		5,232	5.75
Pannella List		4,141	4.55
Lega Alpina Lumbarda		1,332	1.46
Lega Angela Bossi		711	0.78
Total		91,056	

==== Single-member constituency results ====
Coalitions	Parties	Votes	%
Franca Valenti	Pole of Freedoms (FI - LN - CCD - UDC)	50,003	55.59
Maria Luisa Sangiorgio	Alliance of Progressives	22,436	24.94
Loredana Pianta	Pact for Italy	11,523	12.81
Piercarlo Cattaneo	National Alliance	5,992	6.66
Total		89,954	100
Source: Ministry of the Interior

=== 1996 Italian general election ===
==== Proportional results ====
Coalitions	Lists	Votes	%
Pole for Freedoms	Forza Italia	23,147	25.98
Pole for Freedoms	National Alliance	8,067	9.05
Pole for Freedoms	CCD-CDU	4,638	5.21
Pole for Freedoms	Total Coalition	35,852	40.24
The Olive Tree	Democratic Party of the Left	14,127	15.85
The Olive Tree	Populars for Prodi (PPI-SVP-PRI-UD-Prodi)	5,347	6.00
The Olive Tree	Italian Renewal	3,323	3.73
The Olive Tree	Federation of the Greens	1,997	2.24
The Olive Tree	Total Coalition	24.794	27.82
Lega Nord		18,851	21.16
Alliance of Progressives	Communist Refoundation Party	6,787	7.62
Pannella List		2,155	2.42
Tricolour Flame		532	0.60
Humanist Movement		132	0.15
Total		89,103	100

==== Single-member constituency results ====
Coalitions	Parties	Votes	%
Giovanni Deodato	Pole of Freedoms	35,574	40.09
Pierluigi Pasi	The Olive Tree	32,703	36.85
Ivaldo Carini	Lega Nord	20,462	23.06
Total		88,739	100
Source: Ministry of the Interior

=== 2001 Italian general election ===
==== Proportional results ====
Coalitions	Lists	Votes	%
House of Freedoms	Forza Italia	31,349	34.78
House of Freedoms	National Alliance	8,365	9.28
House of Freedoms	Lega Nord	8,263	9.17
House of Freedoms	CCD-CDU	1,703	1.89
House of Freedoms	Total coalition	49,680	55.12
The Olive Tree	The Daisy (Dem - PPI - RI - UDEUR)	14,408	15.98
The Olive Tree	Democrats of the Left	9,839	10.91
The Olive Tree	The Sunflower (FdV - SDI)	1,744	1.93
The Olive Tree	Party of Italian Communists	1,577	1.75
The Olive Tree	Total coalition	27,568	30.57
Communist Refoundation Party		5.190	5.76
Italy of Values		3,394	3.77
Pannella List		2,400	2.66
Pensioners' Party		959	1.06
European Democracy		876	0.97
Abolizione scorporo		76	0.08
Total		90,143	100%

==== Single-member constituency results ====
Candidates	Parties	Votes	%
Giovanni Deodato	House of Freedoms	47,531	53.47
Sergio Tremolada	The Olive Tree	35,207	39.60
Agostina Castiglioni	Italy of Values	4,193	4.72
Diego Vinicio Lifonti	European Democracy	1,965	2.21
Total		88,896	100%
Source: Ministry of the Interior

== See also ==
- List of Italian Chamber of Deputies single-member constituencies (1994–2006)
- Abbiategrasso (Italian Senate constituency)
- Abbiategrasso (Kingdom of Italy constituency)
- Abbiategrasso (Kingdom of Sardinia constituency)
