= Ober-Ramstadt =

- Town
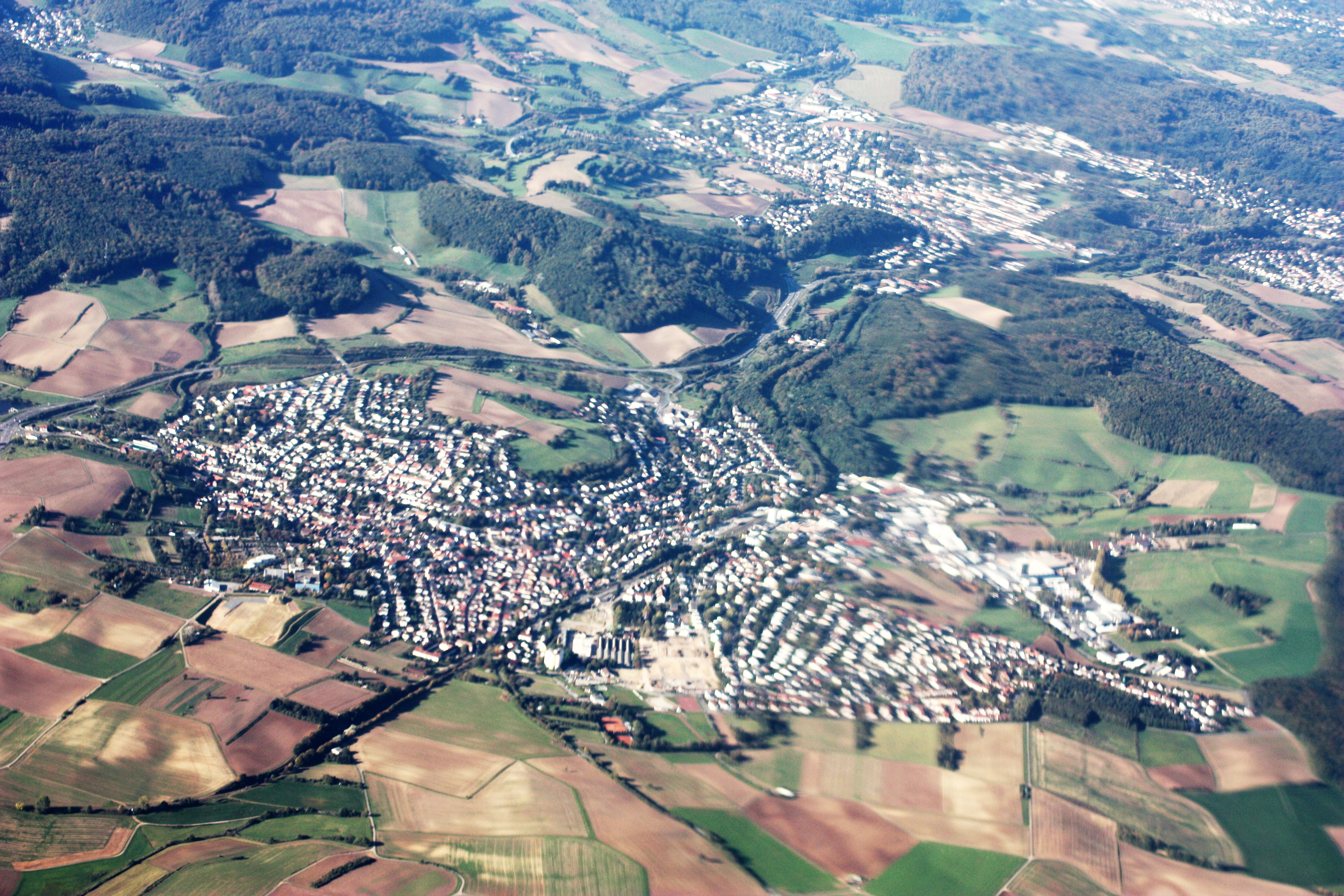

- Coat of arms

- Location of Ober-Ramstadt within Darmstadt-Dieburg district
- Interactive map of Ober-Ramstadt
- Location within Germany Location within Hesse
- Coordinates: 49°50′N 08°45′E
- Country: Germany
- State: Hesse
- Admin. region: Darmstadt
- District: Darmstadt-Dieburg
- Subdivisions: 3 Stadtteile

Government
  - Mayor (2022–28): Tobias Silbereis

Area
  - Total: 41.88 km^{2} (16.17 sq mi)
- Elevation: 200–338 m (656–1,109 ft)

Population (2025-12-31)
  - Total: 15,039
  - Density: 359.1/km^{2} (930.1/sq mi)
- Time zone: UTC+01:00 (CET)
  - Summer (DST): UTC+02:00 (CEST)
- Postal codes: 64368–64372
- Dialling codes: 06154
- Vehicle registration: DA, DI
- Website: www.ober-ramstadt.de

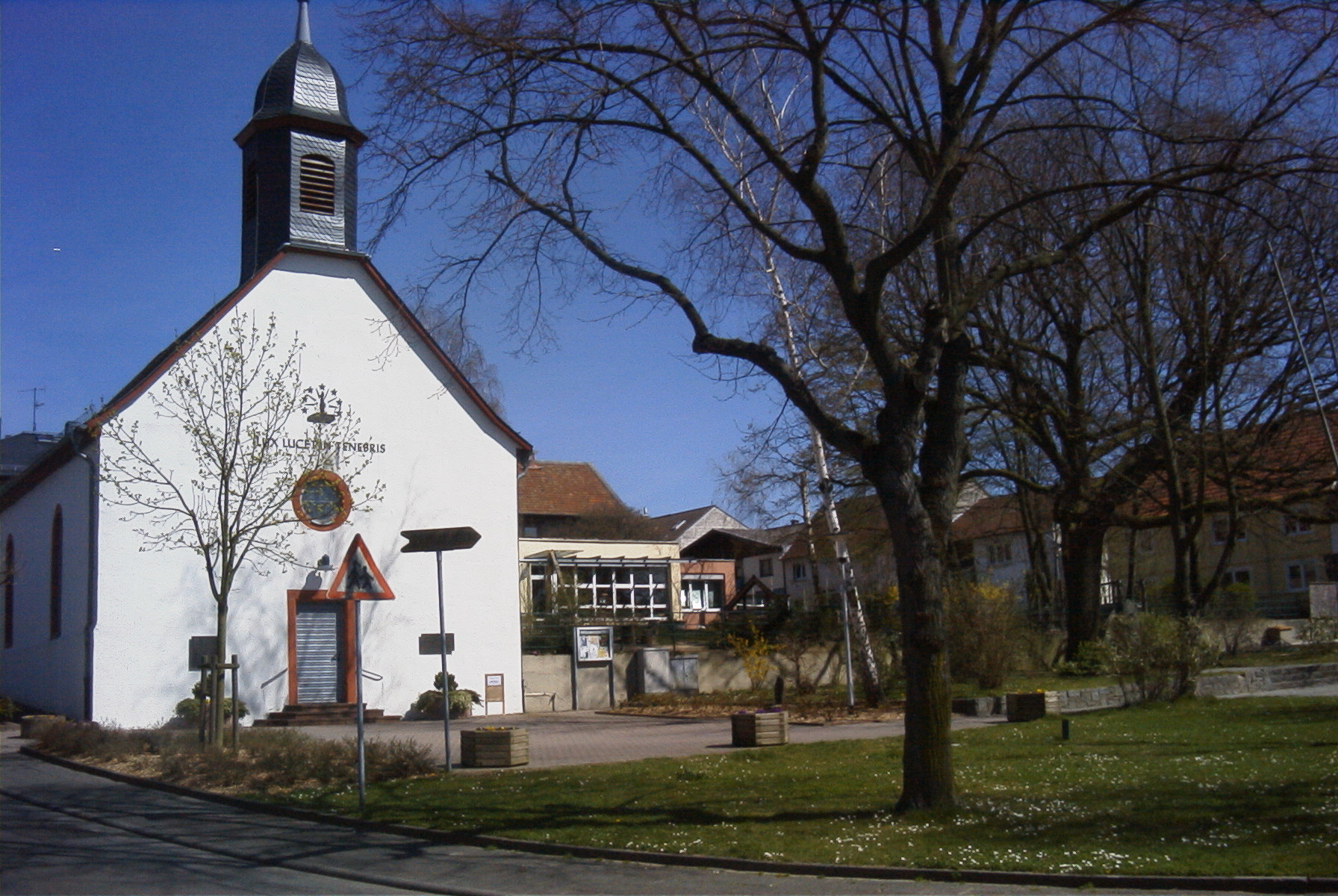
Church in Rohrbach, with the Waldensian Motto "Lux lucet in tenebris" above the entrance

Ober-Ramstadt (German pronunciation: [ˈoːbɐ ˈʁamʃtat], lit. 'Upper Ramstadt', in contrast to "Lower Ramstadt") is a town in the Darmstadt-Dieburg district, in Hessen, Germany. It is situated 9 km southeast of Darmstadt. As of 2020, its population was 15,127.

== Geography ==
=== Location ===
Ober-Ramstadt is situated 9 km away from Darmstadt on the Bundesstrasse 426 (National Route 426) at the foot of the Odenwald. The small river Modau flows through Ober-Ramstadt, forming a little artificial lake south of the city.

=== Neighbouring communities and areas ===
Ober-Ramstadt borders Roßdorf to the north, to the east the city of Reinheim, Groß-Bieberau to the southeast, the community of Modautal in the south, to the west Mühltal, and to the northwest the city of Darmstadt.

=== Divisions and districts ===
Since 1977, Ober-Ramstadt is formed by the town itself plus three more Stadtteile: Modau, (2.877 citizens 30 June 2005), Wembach-Hahn, (1.004 citizens 30 June 2005), and Rohrbach, (1.534 citizens 30 June 2005), which joined in voluntarily in 1972.

== History ==
Traces of first settlement have been found which date from the later Stone Age. Written evidence derives from 1310, when Eberhardt, Count of Katzenelnbogen received the same freedoms and rights as the city of Frankfurt for his town Ramstadt. This included the right to hold a market and to build fortifications around the town. During and after the Thirty Years' War, the bigger part of population died, mainly through pestilence.

In 1699, Ernest Louis, Landgrave of Hesse-Darmstadt allowed the Waldensians from the Piedmont valley of Pragelato to settle on his property in Rohrbach, Wembach and Hahn, which were left deserted as a result of the preceding war and pestilence. The Waldensians had to flee from their hometowns because of religious pursuits. Waldensians still have a vital religious community in Rohrbach-Wembach-Hahn. Until the end of the 19th century, waldensian school lessons were taught in French language.

Since the 19th century, Ober-Ramstadt began to industrialize. In 1895, Eduard Murjahn founded the „Deutsche Amphibolin-Werke“ (German Amphibolite Works), which today is market leader in the paints and enamels branch in Germany and other countries. In 1901, a centralized watersupply was set up, followed by electricity in 1907.

The town history can be seen in the town museum, located in the former town hall built in 1732.

== International relations ==
Ober-Ramstadt is twinned with:

- Cogoleto, Italy, since 1959
- Pragelato, Italy, since 1974
- Vermezzo, Italy, since 2003
- Zelo Surrigone, Italy, since 2003
- Saint-André-les-Vergers, France, since 1970
- Thurm (today part of Mülsen), Germany, since 1990
- Fethiye (Malatya), Turkey, since 2004

== Famous people ==
- Georg Christoph Lichtenberg (1742–1799), born in Ober-Ramstadt, 18th-century scientist and satirist.
- Friedrich Alefeld (1820–1872) lived and died in Ober-Ramstadt, was a botanist, author and medical practitioner.
- Arnulf Zitelmann (born 1929) is a freelance author.
- Gerhard Kleppinger (born 1958) former footballer.
