= Time, Labor and Social Domination =

Book by Moishe Postone

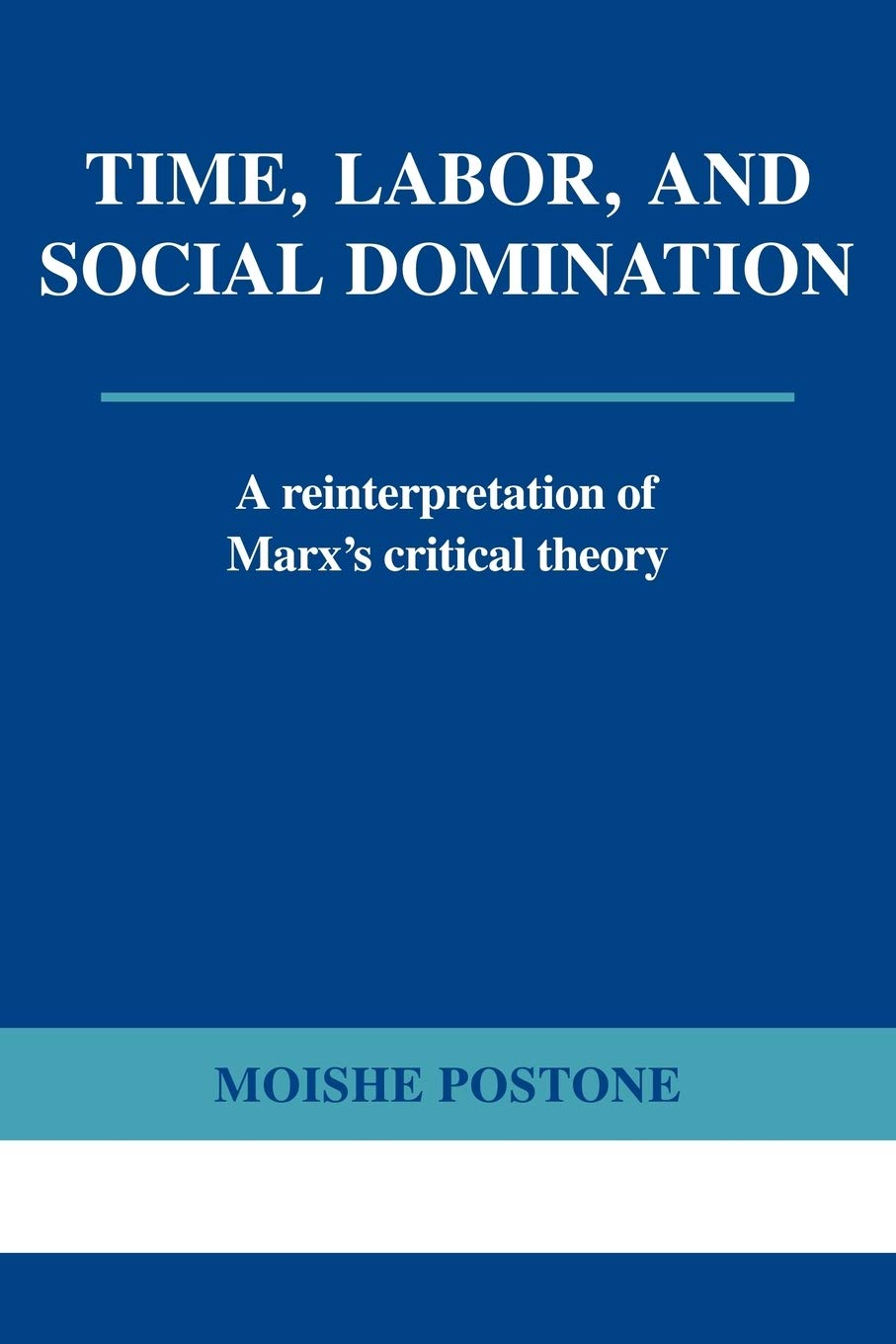
Cover of Time, Labor, and Social Domination (1993)

Time, Labor and Social Domination: A Reinterpretation of Marx's Critical Theory is a 1993 book by the scholar Moishe Postone released by Cambridge University Press. In the book Postone presents a reinterpretation of Marx's critical theory. The book provides a reexamination of the core categories in Marx's critique of political economy.

== Key themes ==
Postone states that Marx's later theories demonstrate that the core categories of modernity, such as commodity and capital, are temporally dynamic categories that are historically specific to modernity and its social form. Postone interprets these categories as both generating and obstructing the possibility of a liberated way of life and community. The origin of this historical dynamic lies in the peculiar form of wealth that is specific to capitalist modernity, namely value, which is also a form of social mediation that Marx distinguishes clearly from material wealth.

Furthermore, Postone states that the transformations undergone by the global capitalist order reveal a profound structural historical dynamic, which is what Marx analyzed. Postone asserts that, in contrast to the conventional view of the Soviet Union as a communist society, the differences between "West and East" are in fact part of a more complex whole, where the Soviet Union was a (failed) variant of the same capital accumulation regime rather than an alternative to capitalism. This is not only because the Soviet Union exploited the working class, but also because it was part of a global, temporal structuring and restructuring of capitalism.

=== Abstract labor and value: a new social form ===
Postone provides an in-depth analysis of Marx's category of the commodity, which is the most basic form of social relations in capitalism, and which is also the basis for the category of capital. Postone points out that Marx's categories are historically specific. On the basis of this understanding, Postone states that he can show that modernity and its categories that appear to be transhistorical are in fact reified appearances. This makes it possible to systematically differentiate the core of modernity from its various historical configurations.

Marx's analysis of the commodity shows that labor in capitalist society has a dual nature: it is concrete labor on the one hand and Abstract labor on the other. Postone examines the fact that abstract labor is not (concrete) labor in general but has a unique social dimension that cannot be derived from (concrete) labor as such: it mediates a new, quasi-objective form of social interdependence. Abstract labor is a historically specific mediating function; it is the content or 'substance' of value. Labor in capitalism, according to Marx, is not only labor understood transhistorically but a historically specific socially mediating activity. Therefore, the objectification of labor—in the commodity, capital, etc.—is both concrete products of labor and objectified forms of social mediation. Basically, capitalist society is structured by a new underlying level of social relations constituted by this historically specific form of labor. These social relations have a special quasi-objective character and are dualistic in that they are characterized by the opposition between an abstract, general, homogeneous dimension and a concrete, particular, material dimension. The relations of capitalist society therefore appear to be 'natural' rather than social.

The abstract nature of this social relation is also expressed in the form of wealth that is dominant in capitalist society. Abstract labor creates value, which is different from the material wealth (in the form of use values) created by concrete labor. Marx analyzed value as a historically specific form of wealth that is tied to the historically unique role of labor in capitalism, and as a form of wealth, it is also a form of social mediation. Material wealth is measured by the quantity of products while value is only constituted by the acquisition of labor time.

=== Abstract and historical time ===
The temporal dynamic of value is at the root of the historical logic of capital, according to the argument put forth by Postone. While Marx's theory of surplus value is often interpreted as a theory of exploitation, Postone rather examines the value in this temporal dynamic. Postone argues that Marx's distinction between the production of use values and the creation of surplus value in the valorization process is critical to understanding this dynamic. Marx distinguished between absolute and relative surplus value, with the latter characterized by temporal acceleration. The higher the level of social productivity, the higher productivity must continue to increase to generate an increase in surplus value. However, this increase in material wealth does not reduce the need for labor. The sale of labor remains a necessary means of subsistence and a basic necessity for the production process, regardless of the level of productivity. In short, Postone's argument suggests that the commodity form structures and subjugates society through a historically specific and abstract form of temporality.

=== Capital and Labor ===
Postone argues that Marx's introduction of the category of capital is not meant to describe a mystified power that controls workers, but rather to describe a real form of existence that has been historically constituted in an alienated form. According to Postones reinterpretation, capital is both dimensions of social labor, i.e., abstract and concrete labor, in alienated form.

Marx initially introduced the category of capital as a dimension of value-creating labor, i.e., self-propagating value. However, as Marx continued his analysis, he argued that the concrete aspect of labor, i.e., use-value-creating labor, also becomes an attribute of capital. In the case of cooperation and manufacture, capital's appropriation of concrete labor appears to be a question of ownership. However, in large-scale industries, the productive forces of concrete labor are no longer those of the workers, and labor is already constituted in an alienated form, separated and opposed to the workers.

Postone's analysis further suggests that capital is not a unitary totality and that the Marxist conception of the dialectical opposition between relations of production and forces of production is not an opposition between relations that are capitalist and forces of production that are external to the totality. Rather, the dialectical contradiction is a contradiction between two dimensions of capital. In other words, capitalist society generates a complex historical dynamic, a directed movement without external telos, as a dialectical and open totality.

== See also ==
- Critique of political economy
- Critique of Economic Reason
- Who Cooked Adam Smith's Dinner?
