= Zitelmann =

Zitelmann is a German surname. Notable people with the surname include:

- Arnulf Zitelmann (1929–2023), German writer
- Ernst Zitelmann (1852–1923), German jurist
- Rainer Zitelmann (born 1957), German historian, journalist, and management consultant
