= Arnulf Zitelmann =

German writer (1929–2023)

Arnulf Zitelmann (9 March 1929 – 8 July 2023) was a German writer.

== Biography ==
Arnulf Zitelmann was born in Oberhausen-Sterkrade on 9 March 1929.

Zitelmann taught religion and was a freelance author in Ober-Ramstadt. He published numerous adventure novels and biographies with Beltz & Gelberg. He received the Friedrich-Bödecker-Prize and the Grand Prize of the German Academy for Children's and Youth Literature for his work as a whole. In 1978, he wrote and published a children's book called Small Trail, which is illustrated by Willi Glasauer, and published by Beltz & Gelberg.

Zitelmann died on 8 July 2023, at the age of 94.

== Bibliography ==
- Small Trail (1978), written by Arnulf Zitelmann, illustrated by Willi Glasauer, published by Beltz & Gelberg
- Twelve Stones for Judea (1979), written by Arnulf Zitelmann, illustrated by Willi Glasauer, published by Beltz & Gelberg
- Among Jugglers (1980), written by Arnulf Zitelmann, illustrated by Willi Glasauer, published by Beltz & Gelberg
- After the Big Glitch (1987), written by Arnulf Zitelmann, illustrated by Klaus Steffens, published by Beltz & Gelberg
- Small Trail (1991), written by Arnulf Zitelmann, illustrated by Gertrude Blohm, published by Beltz & Gelberg
