= Iring Fetscher =

German political scientist (1922–2014)

- Born: 4 March 1922; Marbach am Neckar, Free People's State of Württemberg, Weimar Republic
- Died: 19 July 2014 (aged 92); Dresden, Saxony, Germany
- Political party: Nazi Party (c. 1940 – ?); Social Democratic Party of Germany (1946–?)
- Spouse: Elisabeth Fetscher

Academic background
- Education: University of Paris; University of Tübingen
- Thesis: Hegels Lehre vom Menschen (1950)
- Doctoral advisor: Eduard Spranger
- Other advisor: Lucien Goldmann
- Influences: Jean Hyppolite; Alexandre Kojève; György Lukács

Academic work
- Discipline: Political science
- School or tradition: Frankfurt School; Marxist humanism
- Institutions: Goethe University Frankfurt
- Doctoral students: Wolfgang Kraushaar; Moishe Postone
- Military career
- Service: Wehrmacht
- Service years: 1940–1945
- Rank: Officer aspirant
- Unit: 4th Army
- Conflicts: World War II

Iring Fetscher (1922–2014) was a German political scientist and researcher on Hegel and Marxism.

== Biography ==
Fetscher was born on 4 March 1922 at Marbach am Neckar as the son of social hygienist Rainer Fetscher and Claire née Müller, and was brought up in Dresden. He attended a Volksschule there from 1928 to 1932, took his Abitur at the König-Georg-Gymnasium, and graduated from an interpreter school (Dolmetscherschule) during the World War II in 1940. He applied to join the Nazi Party in May 1940 and was admitted in September of the same year. When the archival record of his membership emerged in 2011, he denied having joined the party of his own initiative.

Later in 1940, he enlisted as an officer candidate in a field artillery regiment of the Wehrmacht in Altenburg. Except for occupation duty breaks in Belgium and the Netherlands, he fought as an Unteroffizier in the Eastern Front against the Soviet Union for the rest of the war, including with the 4th Army in the Heiligenbeil Pocket during the Red Army's East Prussian offensive until the end of March 1945. In late April 1945, he was evacuated from the Vistula Spit on the steamer Ubena of the Hamburg–Africa Line to Copenhagen. Held as a British prisoner-of-war, he attempted to enlist as a soldier in British Asia. Following his release, he made his way to Braunschweig and reached Dresden in December 1945.

After the Second World War he initially studied medicine, then philosophy, German studies, French and history at the University of Tübingen, with a stay in Paris in 1948–1949, where by his own account he met Lucien Goldmann and became influenced by the French Hegel scholars Jean Hyppolite, Alexandre Kojève, Gaston Fessard and Jean Wahl. In September 1947, he converted to Catholicism in the Beuron Archabbey. He received a doctorate from Tübingen in 1950 under the supervision of Eduard Spranger. He belatedly published his thesis Hegels Lehre vom Menschen in 1970. In 1950, he joined the Evangelical Study Group's Commission on Marxism launched in Heidelberg by Erwin Metzke on behalf of the World Council of Churches. He achieved habilitation in 1959 with a dissertation on the political philosophy of Jean-Jacques Rousseau.

Fetscher taught political science at Tübingen from 1960 to 1963. From 1963 to 1988, he was a professor of political science and social philosophy at the Goethe University Frankfurt. He is identified with the "second generation" of the Frankfurt School, along with Jürgen Habermas, and Alfred Schmidt. Leszek Kołakowski, while taking Fetscher to be a distinguished historian of Marxism with a critical but positive attitude, did not see him as of the Frankfurt School more than notionally.

In 1976, he published his own version of The Wolf and the Seven Young Goats by the Brothers Grimm, Die Geiß und die sieben Wölflein ('The Goat and the Seven Young Wolves'), as part of the children's book Update on Rumpelstiltskin and other Fairy Tales by 43 Authors compiled by Hans-Joachim Gelberg, illustrated by Willi Glasauer, and published by Beltz & Gelberg. In 1993, Fetscher was honored with induction into the French Ordre des Palmes académiques. Fetscher died on 19 July 2014.

== Major works ==
- Von Marx zur Sowjetideologie. Wiesbaden 1956. (22 editions until 1987.)
- Rousseaus politische Philosophie. Zur Geschichte des demokratischen Freiheitsbegriffs. Neuwied, Berlin 1960.
- Der Marxismus. Seine Geschichte in Dokumenten, 3 vols., München 1963–1965.
- Marx and Marxism. New York: Herder & Herder, 1971. (Translation of Karl Marx und der Marxismus, 1967.)
- Die Geiß und die sieben Wölflein (The Goat and the Seven Young Wolves) in Update on Rumpelstiltskin and other Fairy Tales by 43 Authors, compiled by Hans-Joachim Gelberg, illustrated by Willi Glasauer, published by Beltz & Gelberg, Weinheim 1976.
- Neugier und Furcht. Versuch, mein Leben zu verstehen. Hamburg: Hoffmann und Campe, 1995, ISBN 3-455-11079-7. (Autobiography)

== See also ==
- Goethe Plaque of the City of Frankfurt

== Bibliography ==
- Anderson, Kevin (1998), "On Marx, Hegel, and Critical Theory in Postwar Germany: A Conversation with Iring Fetscher" (PDF), Studies in East European Thought, 50: 1–18, doi:10.1023/A:1008626805846, ISSN 1573-0948, JSTOR 20099661, S2CID 141508542
