= Vermezzo con Zelo =

- Comune
- Comune di Vermezzo con Zelo
- Location within Italy Location within Lombardy
- Coordinates: 45°23′33.81″N 8°58′55.24″E
- Country: Italy
- Region: Lombardy
- Province: Milan (MI)

Government
  - Mayor: Andrea Cipullo

Area
  - Total: 10.74 km^{2} (4.15 sq mi)

Population (31 December 2018)
  - Total: 5,805
  - Density: 540.5/km^{2} (1,400/sq mi)
- Time zone: UTC+1 (CET)
  - Summer (DST): UTC+2 (CEST)
- Postal code: 20071
- Dialing code: 02

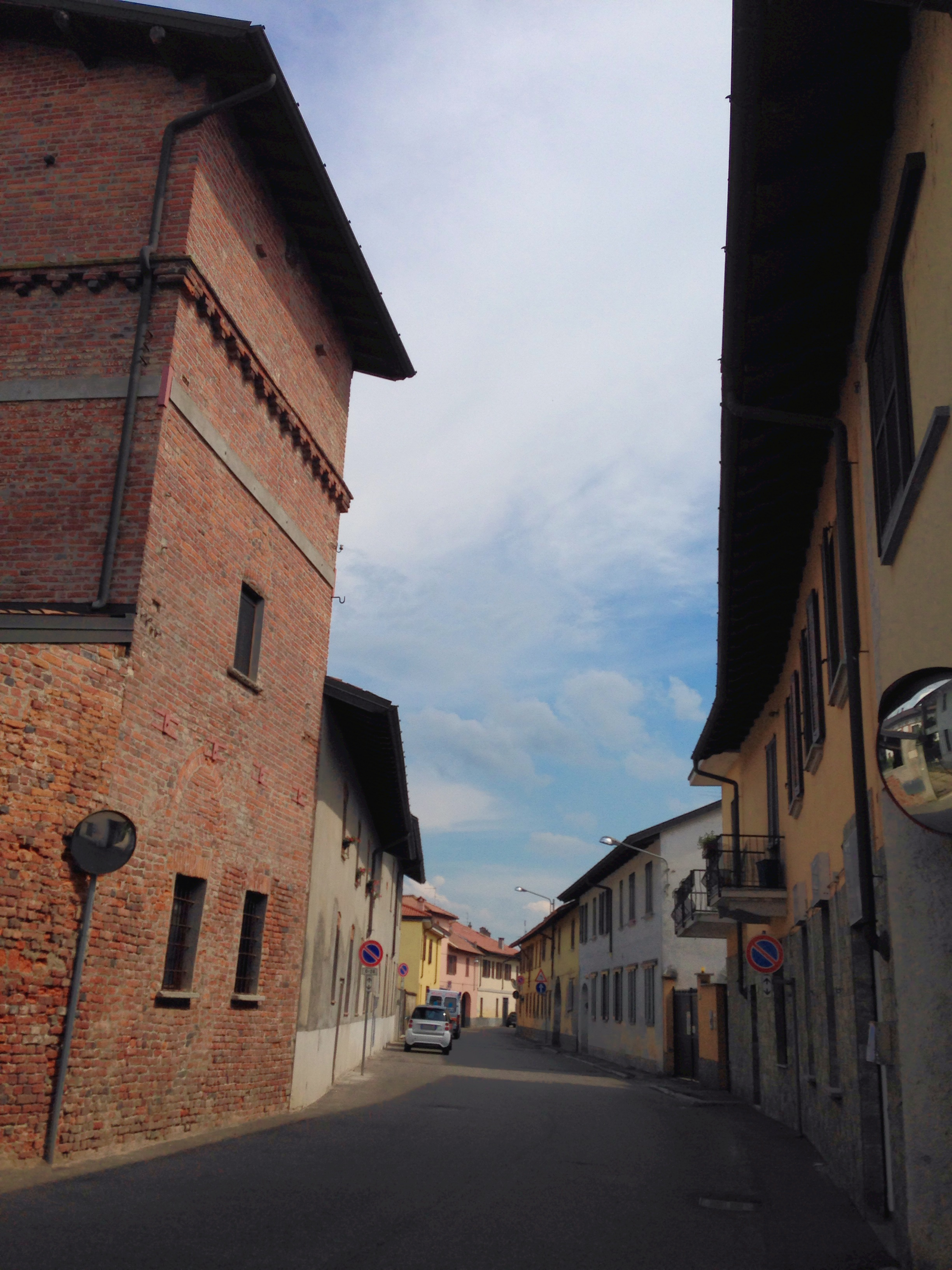
Via Ponti Carmine (street) in Vermezzo

Vermezzo con Zelo is a comune (municipality) in the Metropolitan City of Milan in the Italian region Lombardy.

It was established on 8 February 2019 by the merger of the municipalities of Vermezzo and Zelo Surrigone.
