= List of Italian Chamber of Deputies single-member constituencies (1994–2006) =

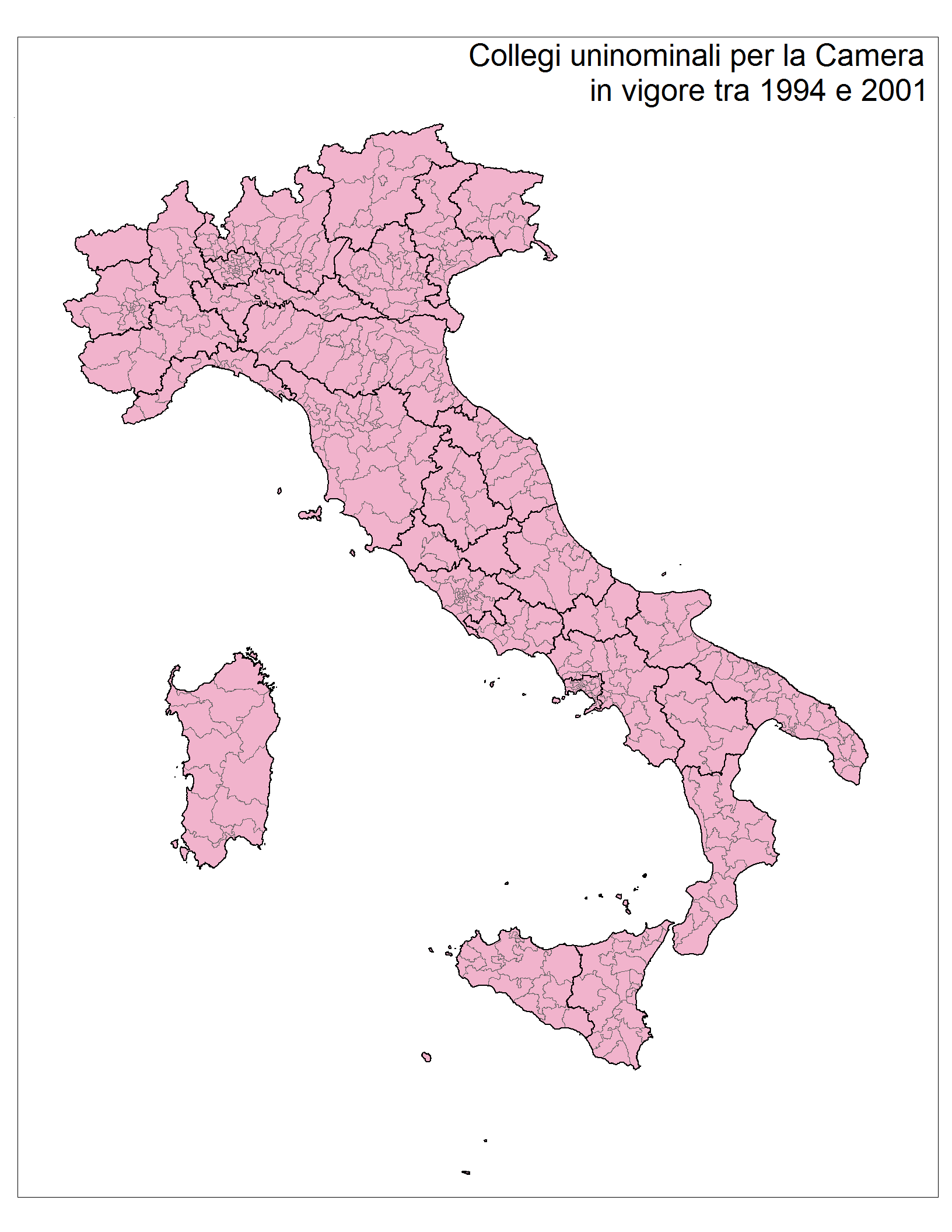
Map of constituencies.

This is a list of single-member constituencies used for elections to the Italian Chamber of Deputies which were used for the 1994, 1996 and 2001 Italian general elections.

These constituencies were established by the Italian electoral law of 1993, the so-called Mattarella Law (Law no. 277, New Rules for the Election of the Chamber of Deputies). The changes to the electoral system were implemented following the result of the 1993 Italian referendum. The law established a mixed electoral system for the Chamber of Deputies and the Senate of the Republic, partly majoritarian and partly proportional. Under the law 75% percent of the members of each house would be elected in single-member constituencies through first-past-the-post voting, with the remaining 25% were elected through a proportional system with party lists.

The creation of single-member constituencies was accompanied by the redefinition of the constituency map, for the proportional section.

== List of constituencies ==
Regions	Elected deputies	Multi-member constituencies		Single-member constituencies	
Regions	Elected deputies	Name	Location	Name	Most populous municipality
Piedmont	36 single-member constituencies 12 proportional seats	Piedmont 1		1. Turin 1	Turin
Piedmont	36 single-member constituencies 12 proportional seats	Piedmont 1		2. Turin 2	Turin
Piedmont	36 single-member constituencies 12 proportional seats	Piedmont 1		3. Turin 3	Turin
Piedmont	36 single-member constituencies 12 proportional seats	Piedmont 1		4. Turin 4	Turin
Piedmont	36 single-member constituencies 12 proportional seats	Piedmont 1		5. Turin 5	Turin
Piedmont	36 single-member constituencies 12 proportional seats	Piedmont 1		6. Turin 6	Turin
Piedmont	36 single-member constituencies 12 proportional seats	Piedmont 1		7. Turin 7	Turin
Piedmont	36 single-member constituencies 12 proportional seats	Piedmont 1		8. Turin 8	Turin
Piedmont	36 single-member constituencies 12 proportional seats	Piedmont 1		9. Ivrea	Ivrea
Piedmont	36 single-member constituencies 12 proportional seats	Piedmont 1		10. Chivasso	Chivasso
Piedmont	36 single-member constituencies 12 proportional seats	Piedmont 1		11. Settimo Torinese	Settimo Torinese
Piedmont	36 single-member constituencies 12 proportional seats	Piedmont 1		12. Moncalieri	Moncalieri
Piedmont	36 single-member constituencies 12 proportional seats	Piedmont 1		13. Nichelino	Nichelino
Piedmont	36 single-member constituencies 12 proportional seats	Piedmont 1		14. Rivoli	Rivoli
Piedmont	36 single-member constituencies 12 proportional seats	Piedmont 1		15. Collegno	Collegno
Piedmont	36 single-member constituencies 12 proportional seats	Piedmont 1		16. Venaria Reale	Venaria Reale
Piedmont	36 single-member constituencies 12 proportional seats	Piedmont 1		17. Rivarolo Canavese	Rivarolo Canavese
Piedmont	36 single-member constituencies 12 proportional seats	Piedmont 1		18. Giaveno	Giaveno
Piedmont	36 single-member constituencies 12 proportional seats	Piedmont 1		19. Pinerolo	Pinerolo
Piedmont	36 single-member constituencies 12 proportional seats	Piedmont 2		1. Alba	Alba
Piedmont	36 single-member constituencies 12 proportional seats	Piedmont 2		2. Savigliano	Savigliano
Piedmont	36 single-member constituencies 12 proportional seats	Piedmont 2		3. Fossano	Fossano
Piedmont	36 single-member constituencies 12 proportional seats	Piedmont 2		4. Cuneo	Cuneo
Piedmont	36 single-member constituencies 12 proportional seats	Piedmont 2		5. Canelli	Canelli
Piedmont	36 single-member constituencies 12 proportional seats	Piedmont 2		6. Asti	Asti
Piedmont	36 single-member constituencies 12 proportional seats	Piedmont 2		7. Casale Monferrato	Casale Monferrato
Piedmont	36 single-member constituencies 12 proportional seats	Piedmont 2		8. Alessandria	Alessandria
Piedmont	36 single-member constituencies 12 proportional seats	Piedmont 2		9. Novi Ligure	Novi Ligure
Piedmont	36 single-member constituencies 12 proportional seats	Piedmont 2		10. Acqui Terme	Acqui Terme
Piedmont	36 single-member constituencies 12 proportional seats	Piedmont 2		11. Vercelli	Vercelli
Piedmont	36 single-member constituencies 12 proportional seats	Piedmont 2		12. Cossato	Cossato
Piedmont	36 single-member constituencies 12 proportional seats	Piedmont 2		13. Biella	Biella
Piedmont	36 single-member constituencies 12 proportional seats	Piedmont 2		14. Novara	Novara
Piedmont	36 single-member constituencies 12 proportional seats	Piedmont 2		15. Trecate	Trecate
Piedmont	36 single-member constituencies 12 proportional seats	Piedmont 2		16. Borgomanero	Borgomanero
Piedmont	36 single-member constituencies 12 proportional seats	Piedmont 2		17. Verbania	Verbania
Aosta Valley	1 single-member constituency	Aosta Valley		1. Aosta	Aosta
Lombardy	74 single-member constituencies 24 proportional seats	Lombardy 1		1. Milan 1	Milan
Lombardy	74 single-member constituencies 24 proportional seats	Lombardy 1		2. Milan 2	Milan
Lombardy	74 single-member constituencies 24 proportional seats	Lombardy 1		3. Milan 3	Milan
Lombardy	74 single-member constituencies 24 proportional seats	Lombardy 1		4. Milan 4	Milan
Lombardy	74 single-member constituencies 24 proportional seats	Lombardy 1		5. Milan 5	Milan
Lombardy	74 single-member constituencies 24 proportional seats	Lombardy 1		6. Milan 6	Milan
Lombardy	74 single-member constituencies 24 proportional seats	Lombardy 1		7. Milan 7	Milan
Lombardy	74 single-member constituencies 24 proportional seats	Lombardy 1		8. Milan 8	Milan
Lombardy	74 single-member constituencies 24 proportional seats	Lombardy 1		9. Milan 9	Milan
Lombardy	74 single-member constituencies 24 proportional seats	Lombardy 1		10. Milan 10	Milan
Lombardy	74 single-member constituencies 24 proportional seats	Lombardy 1		11. Milan 11	Milan
Lombardy	74 single-member constituencies 24 proportional seats	Lombardy 1		12. Rozzano	Rozzano
Lombardy	74 single-member constituencies 24 proportional seats	Lombardy 1		13. Corsico	Corsico
Lombardy	74 single-member constituencies 24 proportional seats	Lombardy 1		14. Abbiategrasso	Abbiategrasso
Lombardy	74 single-member constituencies 24 proportional seats	Lombardy 1		15. Rozzano	Busto Garolfo
Lombardy	74 single-member constituencies 24 proportional seats	Lombardy 1		16. Legnano	Legnano
Lombardy	74 single-member constituencies 24 proportional seats	Lombardy 1		17. Rho	Rho
Lombardy	74 single-member constituencies 24 proportional seats	Lombardy 1		18. Bollate	Bollate
Lombardy	74 single-member constituencies 24 proportional seats	Lombardy 1		19. Limbiate	Limbiate
Lombardy	74 single-member constituencies 24 proportional seats	Lombardy 1		20. Paderno Dugnano	Paderno Dugnano
Lombardy	74 single-member constituencies 24 proportional seats	Lombardy 1		21. Sesto San Giovanni	Sesto San Giovanni
Lombardy	74 single-member constituencies 24 proportional seats	Lombardy 1		22. Cinisello Balsamo	Cinisello Balsamo
Lombardy	74 single-member constituencies 24 proportional seats	Lombardy 1		23. Desio	Desio
Lombardy	74 single-member constituencies 24 proportional seats	Lombardy 1		24. Seregno	Seregno
Lombardy	74 single-member constituencies 24 proportional seats	Lombardy 1		25. Monza	Monza
Lombardy	74 single-member constituencies 24 proportional seats	Lombardy 1		26. Vimercate	Vimercate
Lombardy	74 single-member constituencies 24 proportional seats	Lombardy 1		27. Agrate Brianza	Agrate Brianza
Lombardy	74 single-member constituencies 24 proportional seats	Lombardy 1		28. Cologno Monzese	Cologno Monzese
Lombardy	74 single-member constituencies 24 proportional seats	Lombardy 1		29. Melzo	Melzo
Lombardy	74 single-member constituencies 24 proportional seats	Lombardy 1		30. Pioltello	Pioltello
Lombardy	74 single-member constituencies 24 proportional seats	Lombardy 1		31. San Giuliano Milanese	San Giuliano Milanese
Lombardy	74 single-member constituencies 24 proportional seats	Lombardy 2		1. Varese	Varese
Lombardy	74 single-member constituencies 24 proportional seats	Lombardy 2		2. Luino	Luino
Lombardy	74 single-member constituencies 24 proportional seats	Lombardy 2		3. Tradate	Tradate
Lombardy	74 single-member constituencies 24 proportional seats	Lombardy 2		4. Sesto Calende	Sesto Calende
Lombardy	74 single-member constituencies 24 proportional seats	Lombardy 2		5. Gallarate	Gallarate
Lombardy	74 single-member constituencies 24 proportional seats	Lombardy 2		6. Busto Arsizio	Busto Arsizio
Lombardy	74 single-member constituencies 24 proportional seats	Lombardy 2		7. Saronno	Saronno
Lombardy	74 single-member constituencies 24 proportional seats	Lombardy 2		8. Como	Como
Lombardy	74 single-member constituencies 24 proportional seats	Lombardy 2		9. Cantù	Cantù
Lombardy	74 single-member constituencies 24 proportional seats	Lombardy 2		10. Erba	Erba
Lombardy	74 single-member constituencies 24 proportional seats	Lombardy 2		11. Olgiate Comasco	Olgiate Comasco
Lombardy	74 single-member constituencies 24 proportional seats	Lombardy 2		12. Morbegno	Morbegno
Lombardy	74 single-member constituencies 24 proportional seats	Lombardy 2		13. Sondrio	Sondrio
Lombardy	74 single-member constituencies 24 proportional seats	Lombardy 2		14. Lecco	Lecco
Lombardy	74 single-member constituencies 24 proportional seats	Lombardy 2		15. Merate	Merate
Lombardy	74 single-member constituencies 24 proportional seats	Lombardy 2		16. Bergamo	Bergamo
Lombardy	74 single-member constituencies 24 proportional seats	Lombardy 2		17. Seriate	Seriate
Lombardy	74 single-member constituencies 24 proportional seats	Lombardy 2		18. Ponte San Pietro	Ponte San Pietro
Lombardy	74 single-member constituencies 24 proportional seats	Lombardy 2		19. Treviglio	Treviglio
Lombardy	74 single-member constituencies 24 proportional seats	Lombardy 2		20. Albino	Albino
Lombardy	74 single-member constituencies 24 proportional seats	Lombardy 2		21. Costa Volpino	Costa Volpino
Lombardy	74 single-member constituencies 24 proportional seats	Lombardy 2		22. Dalmine	Dalmine
Lombardy	74 single-member constituencies 24 proportional seats	Lombardy 2		23. Zogno	Zogno
Lombardy	74 single-member constituencies 24 proportional seats	Lombardy 2		24. Brescia - Flero	Brescia
Lombardy	74 single-member constituencies 24 proportional seats	Lombardy 2		25. Brescia - Roncadelle	Brescia
Lombardy	74 single-member constituencies 24 proportional seats	Lombardy 2		26. Rezzato	Rezzato
Lombardy	74 single-member constituencies 24 proportional seats	Lombardy 2		27. Desenzano del Garda	Desenzano del Garda
Lombardy	74 single-member constituencies 24 proportional seats	Lombardy 2		28. Ghedi	Ghedi
Lombardy	74 single-member constituencies 24 proportional seats	Lombardy 2		29. Orzinuovi	Orzinuovi
Lombardy	74 single-member constituencies 24 proportional seats	Lombardy 2		30. Chiari	Chiari
Lombardy	74 single-member constituencies 24 proportional seats	Lombardy 2		31. Lumezzane	Lumezzane
Lombardy	74 single-member constituencies 24 proportional seats	Lombardy 2		32. Darfo Boario Terme	Darfo Boario Terme
Lombardy	74 single-member constituencies 24 proportional seats	Lombardy 3		1. Pavia	Pavia
Lombardy	74 single-member constituencies 24 proportional seats	Lombardy 3		2. Vigevano	Vigevano
Lombardy	74 single-member constituencies 24 proportional seats	Lombardy 3		3. Mortara	Mortara
Lombardy	74 single-member constituencies 24 proportional seats	Lombardy 3		4. Voghera	Voghera
Lombardy	74 single-member constituencies 24 proportional seats	Lombardy 3		5. Lodi	Lodi
Lombardy	74 single-member constituencies 24 proportional seats	Lombardy 3		6. Crema	Crema
Lombardy	74 single-member constituencies 24 proportional seats	Lombardy 3		7. Soresina	Soresina
Lombardy	74 single-member constituencies 24 proportional seats	Lombardy 3		8. Cremona	Cremona
Lombardy	74 single-member constituencies 24 proportional seats	Lombardy 3		9. Castiglione delle Stiviere	Castiglione delle Stiviere
Lombardy	74 single-member constituencies 24 proportional seats	Lombardy 3		10. Mantova	Mantova
Lombardy	74 single-member constituencies 24 proportional seats	Lombardy 3		11. Suzzara	Suzzara
Trentino-Alto Adige	8 single-member constituencies 2 proportional seats	Trentino-Alto Adige		1. Bolzano	Bolzano
Trentino-Alto Adige	8 single-member constituencies 2 proportional seats	Trentino-Alto Adige		2. Appiano sulla Strada del Vino	Appiano sulla Strada del Vino
Trentino-Alto Adige	8 single-member constituencies 2 proportional seats	Trentino-Alto Adige		3. Merano	Merano
Trentino-Alto Adige	8 single-member constituencies 2 proportional seats	Trentino-Alto Adige		4. Bressanone	Bressanone
Trentino-Alto Adige	8 single-member constituencies 2 proportional seats	Trentino-Alto Adige		5. Trento	Trento
Trentino-Alto Adige	8 single-member constituencies 2 proportional seats	Trentino-Alto Adige		6. Rovereto	Rovereto
Trentino-Alto Adige	8 single-member constituencies 2 proportional seats	Trentino-Alto Adige		7. Lavis	Lavis
Trentino-Alto Adige	8 single-member constituencies 2 proportional seats	Trentino-Alto Adige		8. Pergine Valsugana	Pergine Valsugana
Veneto	37 collegi uninominali 12 seggi proporzionali	Veneto 1		1. Verona West	Verona
Veneto	37 collegi uninominali 12 seggi proporzionali	Veneto 1		2. Verona East	Verona
Veneto	37 collegi uninominali 12 seggi proporzionali	Veneto 1		3. Bussolengo	Bussolengo
Veneto	37 collegi uninominali 12 seggi proporzionali	Veneto 1		4. San Martino Buon Albergo	San Martino Buon Albergo
Veneto	37 collegi uninominali 12 seggi proporzionali	Veneto 1		5. San Giovanni Lupatoto	San Giovanni Lupatoto
Veneto	37 collegi uninominali 12 seggi proporzionali	Veneto 1		6. Villafranca di Verona	Villafranca di Verona
Veneto	37 collegi uninominali 12 seggi proporzionali	Veneto 1		7. Legnago	Legnago
Veneto	37 collegi uninominali 12 seggi proporzionali	Veneto 1		8. Vicenza	Vicenza
Veneto	37 collegi uninominali 12 seggi proporzionali	Veneto 1		9. Bassano del Grappa	Bassano del Grappa
Veneto	37 collegi uninominali 12 seggi proporzionali	Veneto 1		10. Thiene	Thiene
Veneto	37 collegi uninominali 12 seggi proporzionali	Veneto 1		11. Arzignano	Arzignano
Veneto	37 collegi uninominali 12 seggi proporzionali	Veneto 1		12. Schio	Schio
Veneto	37 collegi uninominali 12 seggi proporzionali	Veneto 1		13. Dueville	Dueville
Veneto	37 collegi uninominali 12 seggi proporzionali	Veneto 1		14. Padova - Selvazzano Dentro	Padova
Veneto	37 collegi uninominali 12 seggi proporzionali	Veneto 1		15. Padova Historic Centre	Padova
Veneto	37 collegi uninominali 12 seggi proporzionali	Veneto 1		16. Este	Este
Veneto	37 collegi uninominali 12 seggi proporzionali	Veneto 1		17. Piove di Sacco	Piove di Sacco
Veneto	37 collegi uninominali 12 seggi proporzionali	Veneto 1		18. Albignasego	Albignasego
Veneto	37 collegi uninominali 12 seggi proporzionali	Veneto 1		19. Cittadella	Cittadella
Veneto	37 collegi uninominali 12 seggi proporzionali	Veneto 1		20. Vigonza	Vigonza
Veneto	37 collegi uninominali 12 seggi proporzionali	Veneto 1		21. Rovigo	Rovigo
Veneto	37 collegi uninominali 12 seggi proporzionali	Veneto 1		22. Adria	Adria
Veneto	37 collegi uninominali 12 seggi proporzionali	Veneto 2		1. Venice - San Marco	Venice
Veneto	37 collegi uninominali 12 seggi proporzionali	Veneto 2		2. Venice - Mestre	Venice
Veneto	37 collegi uninominali 12 seggi proporzionali	Veneto 2		3. Venice - Mira	Venice
Veneto	37 collegi uninominali 12 seggi proporzionali	Veneto 2		4. Mirano	Mirano
Veneto	37 collegi uninominali 12 seggi proporzionali	Veneto 2		5. Chioggia	Chioggia
Veneto	37 collegi uninominali 12 seggi proporzionali	Veneto 2		6. Venice - San Donà di Piave	Venice
Veneto	37 collegi uninominali 12 seggi proporzionali	Veneto 2		7. Portogruaro	Portogruaro
Veneto	37 collegi uninominali 12 seggi proporzionali	Veneto 2		8. Treviso	Treviso
Veneto	37 collegi uninominali 12 seggi proporzionali	Veneto 2		9. Vittorio Veneto	Vittorio Veneto
Veneto	37 collegi uninominali 12 seggi proporzionali	Veneto 2		10. Castelfranco Veneto	Castelfranco Veneto
Veneto	37 collegi uninominali 12 seggi proporzionali	Veneto 2		11. Oderzo	Oderzo
Veneto	37 collegi uninominali 12 seggi proporzionali	Veneto 2		12. Conegliano	Conegliano
Veneto	37 collegi uninominali 12 seggi proporzionali	Veneto 2		13. Belluno	Belluno
Veneto	37 collegi uninominali 12 seggi proporzionali	Veneto 2		14. Feltre	Feltre
Veneto	37 collegi uninominali 12 seggi proporzionali	Veneto 2		15. Montebelluna	Montebelluna
Friuli-Venezia Giulia	10 single-member constituencies 3 proportional seats	Friuli-Venezia Giulia		1. Trieste Centre	Trieste
Friuli-Venezia Giulia	10 single-member constituencies 3 proportional seats	Friuli-Venezia Giulia		2. Trieste - Muggia	Trieste
Friuli-Venezia Giulia	10 single-member constituencies 3 proportional seats	Friuli-Venezia Giulia		3. Gorizia	Gorizia
Friuli-Venezia Giulia	10 single-member constituencies 3 proportional seats	Friuli-Venezia Giulia		4. Cervignano del Friuli	Cervignano del Friuli
Friuli-Venezia Giulia	10 single-member constituencies 3 proportional seats	Friuli-Venezia Giulia		5. Udine	Udine
Friuli-Venezia Giulia	10 single-member constituencies 3 proportional seats	Friuli-Venezia Giulia		6. Gemona del Friuli	Gemona del Friuli
Friuli-Venezia Giulia	10 single-member constituencies 3 proportional seats	Friuli-Venezia Giulia		7. Codroipo	Codroipo
Friuli-Venezia Giulia	10 single-member constituencies 3 proportional seats	Friuli-Venezia Giulia		8. Cividale del Friuli	Cividale del Friuli
Friuli-Venezia Giulia	10 single-member constituencies 3 proportional seats	Friuli-Venezia Giulia		9. Sacile	Sacile
Friuli-Venezia Giulia	10 single-member constituencies 3 proportional seats	Friuli-Venezia Giulia		10. Pordenone	Pordenone
Liguria	14 single-member constituencies 5 proportional seats	Liguria		1. Sanremo	Sanremo
Liguria	14 single-member constituencies 5 proportional seats	Liguria		2. Imperia	Imperia
Liguria	14 single-member constituencies 5 proportional seats	Liguria		3. Albenga	Albenga
Liguria	14 single-member constituencies 5 proportional seats	Liguria		4. Savona	Savona
Liguria	14 single-member constituencies 5 proportional seats	Liguria		5. Genova - Varazze	Genoa
Liguria	14 single-member constituencies 5 proportional seats	Liguria		6. Genova - Sestri	Genoa
Liguria	14 single-member constituencies 5 proportional seats	Liguria		7. Genova - Campomorone	Genoa
Liguria	14 single-member constituencies 5 proportional seats	Liguria		8. Genova - San Fruttuoso	Genoa
Liguria	14 single-member constituencies 5 proportional seats	Liguria		9. Genova - Parenzo	Genoa
Liguria	14 single-member constituencies 5 proportional seats	Liguria		10. Genova - Nervi	Genoa
Liguria	14 single-member constituencies 5 proportional seats	Liguria		11. Rapallo	Rapallo
Liguria	14 single-member constituencies 5 proportional seats	Liguria		11. Chiavari	Chiavari
Liguria	14 single-member constituencies 5 proportional seats	Liguria		11. Sarzana	Sarzana
Liguria	14 single-member constituencies 5 proportional seats	Liguria		11. La Spezia	La Spezia
Emilia-Romagna	32 single-member constituencies 11 proportional seats	Emilia-Romagna		1. Rimini - Sant'Arcangelo di Romagna	Rimini
Emilia-Romagna	32 single-member constituencies 11 proportional seats	Emilia-Romagna		2. Rimini - Riccione	Rimini
Emilia-Romagna	32 single-member constituencies 11 proportional seats	Emilia-Romagna		3. Forlì	Forlì
Emilia-Romagna	32 single-member constituencies 11 proportional seats	Emilia-Romagna		4. Cesena	Cesena
Emilia-Romagna	32 single-member constituencies 11 proportional seats	Emilia-Romagna		5. Savignano sul Rubicone	Savignano sul Rubicone
Emilia-Romagna	32 single-member constituencies 11 proportional seats	Emilia-Romagna		6. Ravenna - Cervia	Ravenna
Emilia-Romagna	32 single-member constituencies 11 proportional seats	Emilia-Romagna		7. Faenza	Faenza
Emilia-Romagna	32 single-member constituencies 11 proportional seats	Emilia-Romagna		8. Ravenna - Lugo	Ravenna
Emilia-Romagna	32 single-member constituencies 11 proportional seats	Emilia-Romagna		9. Ferrara - Via Bologna	Ferrara
Emilia-Romagna	32 single-member constituencies 11 proportional seats	Emilia-Romagna		10. Comacchio	Comacchio
Emilia-Romagna	32 single-member constituencies 11 proportional seats	Emilia-Romagna		11. Ferrara - Cento	Ferrara
Emilia-Romagna	32 single-member constituencies 11 proportional seats	Emilia-Romagna		12. Bologna - Mazzini	Bologna
Emilia-Romagna	32 single-member constituencies 11 proportional seats	Emilia-Romagna		13. Bologna - San Donato	Bologna
Emilia-Romagna	32 single-member constituencies 11 proportional seats	Emilia-Romagna		14. Bologna - Borgo Panigale	Bologna
Emilia-Romagna	32 single-member constituencies 11 proportional seats	Emilia-Romagna		15. Imola	Imola
Emilia-Romagna	32 single-member constituencies 11 proportional seats	Emilia-Romagna		16. Bologna - Pianoro	Bologna
Emilia-Romagna	32 single-member constituencies 11 proportional seats	Emilia-Romagna		17. Casalecchio di Reno	Casalecchio di Reno
Emilia-Romagna	32 single-member constituencies 11 proportional seats	Emilia-Romagna		18. San Giovanni in Persiceto	San Giovanni in Persiceto
Emilia-Romagna	32 single-member constituencies 11 proportional seats	Emilia-Romagna		19. San Lazzaro di Savena	San Lazzaro di Savena
Emilia-Romagna	32 single-member constituencies 11 proportional seats	Emilia-Romagna		20. Modena Centre	Modena
Emilia-Romagna	32 single-member constituencies 11 proportional seats	Emilia-Romagna		21. Mirandola	Mirandola
Emilia-Romagna	32 single-member constituencies 11 proportional seats	Emilia-Romagna		22. Vignola	Vignola
Emilia-Romagna	32 single-member constituencies 11 proportional seats	Emilia-Romagna		23. Modena Sassuolo	Modena
Emilia-Romagna	32 single-member constituencies 11 proportional seats	Emilia-Romagna		24. Carpi	Carpi
Emilia-Romagna	32 single-member constituencies 11 proportional seats	Emilia-Romagna		25. Reggio nell'Emilia	Reggio nell'Emilia
Emilia-Romagna	32 single-member constituencies 11 proportional seats	Emilia-Romagna		26. Guastalla	Guastalla
Emilia-Romagna	32 single-member constituencies 11 proportional seats	Emilia-Romagna		27. Scandiano	Scandiano
Emilia-Romagna	32 single-member constituencies 11 proportional seats	Emilia-Romagna		28. Parma Centre	Parma
Emilia-Romagna	32 single-member constituencies 11 proportional seats	Emilia-Romagna		29. Parma Collecchio	Parma
Emilia-Romagna	32 single-member constituencies 11 proportional seats	Emilia-Romagna		30. Fidenza	Fidenza
Emilia-Romagna	32 single-member constituencies 11 proportional seats	Emilia-Romagna		31. Piacenza	Piacenza
Emilia-Romagna	32 single-member constituencies 11 proportional seats	Emilia-Romagna		32. Fiorenzuola d'Arda	Fiorenzuola d'Arda
Tuscany	29 single-member constituencies 10 proportional seats	Tuscany		1. Florence 1	Florence
Tuscany	29 single-member constituencies 10 proportional seats	Tuscany		2. Florence 2	Florence
Tuscany	29 single-member constituencies 10 proportional seats	Tuscany		3. Florence 3	Florence
Tuscany	29 single-member constituencies 10 proportional seats	Tuscany		4. Scandicci	Scandicci
Tuscany	29 single-member constituencies 10 proportional seats	Tuscany		5. Sesto Fiorentino	Sesto Fiorentino
Tuscany	29 single-member constituencies 10 proportional seats	Tuscany		6. Florence Pontassieve	Firenze
Tuscany	29 single-member constituencies 10 proportional seats	Tuscany		7. Empoli	Empoli
Tuscany	29 single-member constituencies 10 proportional seats	Tuscany		8. Bagno a Ripoli	Bagno a Ripoli
Tuscany	29 single-member constituencies 10 proportional seats	Tuscany		9. Prato - Montemurlo	Prato
Tuscany	29 single-member constituencies 10 proportional seats	Tuscany		10. Prato - Carmignano	Prato
Tuscany	29 single-member constituencies 10 proportional seats	Tuscany		11. Pistoia	Pistoia
Tuscany	29 single-member constituencies 10 proportional seats	Tuscany		12. Montecatini Terme	Montecatini Terme
Tuscany	29 single-member constituencies 10 proportional seats	Tuscany		13. Montevarchi	Montevarchi
Tuscany	29 single-member constituencies 10 proportional seats	Tuscany		14. Arezzo	Arezzo
Tuscany	29 single-member constituencies 10 proportional seats	Tuscany		15. Cortona	Cortona
Tuscany	29 single-member constituencies 10 proportional seats	Tuscany		16. Siena	Siena
Tuscany	29 single-member constituencies 10 proportional seats	Tuscany		17. Pontedera	Pontedera
Tuscany	29 single-member constituencies 10 proportional seats	Tuscany		18. Massa Marittima	Massa Marittima
Tuscany	29 single-member constituencies 10 proportional seats	Tuscany		19. Grosseto	Grosseto
Tuscany	29 single-member constituencies 10 proportional seats	Tuscany		20. Carrara	Carrara
Tuscany	29 single-member constituencies 10 proportional seats	Tuscany		21. Massa	Massa
Tuscany	29 single-member constituencies 10 proportional seats	Tuscany		22. Viareggio	Viareggio
Tuscany	29 single-member constituencies 10 proportional seats	Tuscany		23. Lucca	Lucca
Tuscany	29 single-member constituencies 10 proportional seats	Tuscany		24. Pisa	Pisa
Tuscany	29 single-member constituencies 10 proportional seats	Tuscany		25. Capannori	Capannori
Tuscany	29 single-member constituencies 10 proportional seats	Tuscany		26. Cascina	Cascina
Tuscany	29 single-member constituencies 10 proportional seats	Tuscany		27. Livorno - Collesalvetti	Livorno
Tuscany	29 single-member constituencies 10 proportional seats	Tuscany		28. Livorno - Rosignano Marittimo	Livorno
Tuscany	29 single-member constituencies 10 proportional seats	Tuscany		29. Piombino	Piombino
Umbria	7 single-member constituencies 2 proportional seats	Umbria		1. Perugia Centre	Perugia
Umbria	7 single-member constituencies 2 proportional seats	Umbria		2. Perugia - Todi	Perugia
Umbria	7 single-member constituencies 2 proportional seats	Umbria		3. Città di Castello	Città di Castello
Umbria	7 single-member constituencies 2 proportional seats	Umbria		4. Gubbio	Gubbio
Umbria	7 single-member constituencies 2 proportional seats	Umbria		5. Foligno	Foligno
Umbria	7 single-member constituencies 2 proportional seats	Umbria		6. Terni	Terni
Umbria	7 single-member constituencies 2 proportional seats	Umbria		7. Orvieto	Orvieto
Marche	12 single-member constituencies 4 proportional seats	Marche		1. Ascoli Piceno	Ascoli Piceno
Marche	12 single-member constituencies 4 proportional seats	Marche		2. San Benedetto del Tronto	San Benedetto del Tronto
Marche	12 single-member constituencies 4 proportional seats	Marche		3. Fermo	Fermo
Marche	12 single-member constituencies 4 proportional seats	Marche		4. Macerata	Macerata
Marche	12 single-member constituencies 4 proportional seats	Marche		5. Civitanova Marche	Civitanova Marche
Marche	12 single-member constituencies 4 proportional seats	Marche		6. Osimo	Osimo
Marche	12 single-member constituencies 4 proportional seats	Marche		7. Ancona	Ancona
Marche	12 single-member constituencies 4 proportional seats	Marche		9. Jesi	Jesi
Marche	12 single-member constituencies 4 proportional seats	Marche		8. Senigallia	Senigallia
Marche	12 single-member constituencies 4 proportional seats	Marche		10. Pesaro	Pesaro
Marche	12 single-member constituencies 4 proportional seats	Marche		11. Urbino	Urbino
Marche	12 single-member constituencies 4 proportional seats	Marche		12. Fano	Fano
Lazio	43 single-member constituencies 14 proportional seats	Lazio 1		1. Rome Centre	Rome
Lazio	43 single-member constituencies 14 proportional seats	Lazio 1		2. Rome Trieste	Rome
Lazio	43 single-member constituencies 14 proportional seats	Lazio 1		3. Rome Val Melaina	Rome
Lazio	43 single-member constituencies 14 proportional seats	Lazio 1		4. Rome Monte Sacro	Rome
Lazio	43 single-member constituencies 14 proportional seats	Lazio 1		5. Rome - Pietralata	Rome
Lazio	43 single-member constituencies 14 proportional seats	Lazio 1		6. Rome - Prenestino - Labicano	Rome
Lazio	43 single-member constituencies 14 proportional seats	Lazio 1		7. Rome - Collatino	Rome
Lazio	43 single-member constituencies 14 proportional seats	Lazio 1		8. Rome - Torre Angela	Rome
Lazio	43 single-member constituencies 14 proportional seats	Lazio 1		9. Rome - Prenestino - Centocelle	Rome
Lazio	43 single-member constituencies 14 proportional seats	Lazio 1		10. Rome Tuscolano	Rome
Lazio	43 single-member constituencies 14 proportional seats	Lazio 1		11. Rome - Don Bosco	Rome
Lazio	43 single-member constituencies 14 proportional seats	Lazio 1		12. Rome - Ciampino	Rome
Lazio	43 single-member constituencies 14 proportional seats	Lazio 1		13. Rome - Appio Latino	Rome
Lazio	43 single-member constituencies 14 proportional seats	Lazio 1		14. Rome - Ardeatino	Rome
Lazio	43 single-member constituencies 14 proportional seats	Lazio 1		15. Rome Ostiense	Rome
Lazio	43 single-member constituencies 14 proportional seats	Lazio 1		16. Rome - Lido di Osti	Rome
Lazio	43 single-member constituencies 14 proportional seats	Lazio 1		17. Rome Fiumicino	Rome
Lazio	43 single-member constituencies 14 proportional seats	Lazio 1		18. Rome - Portuense	Rome
Lazio	43 single-member constituencies 14 proportional seats	Lazio 1		19. Rome - Zona Sub. Gianicolense	Rome
Lazio	43 single-member constituencies 14 proportional seats	Lazio 1		20. Rome Gianicolense	Rome
Lazio	43 single-member constituencies 14 proportional seats	Lazio 1		21. Rome - Trionfale	Rome
Lazio	43 single-member constituencies 14 proportional seats	Lazio 1		22. Rome - Tomba di Nerone	Rome
Lazio	43 single-member constituencies 14 proportional seats	Lazio 1		23. Rome - Primavalle	Rome
Lazio	43 single-member constituencies 14 proportional seats	Lazio 1		24. Rome - Della Vittoria	Rome
Lazio	43 single-member constituencies 14 proportional seats	Lazio 1		25. Civitavecchia	Civitavecchia
Lazio	43 single-member constituencies 14 proportional seats	Lazio 1		26. Monterotondo	Monterotondo
Lazio	43 single-member constituencies 14 proportional seats	Lazio 1		27. Guidonia Montecelio	Guidonia Montecelio
Lazio	43 single-member constituencies 14 proportional seats	Lazio 1		28. Tivoli	Tivoli
Lazio	43 single-member constituencies 14 proportional seats	Lazio 1		29. Colleferro	Colleferro
Lazio	43 single-member constituencies 14 proportional seats	Lazio 1		30. Marino	Marino
Lazio	43 single-member constituencies 14 proportional seats	Lazio 1		31. Velletri	Velletri
Lazio	43 single-member constituencies 14 proportional seats	Lazio 1		32. Pomezia	Pomezia
Lazio	43 single-member constituencies 14 proportional seats	Lazio 2		1. Viterbo	Viterbo
Lazio	43 single-member constituencies 14 proportional seats	Lazio 2		2. Tarquinia	Tarquinia
Lazio	43 single-member constituencies 14 proportional seats	Lazio 2		3. Rieti	Rieti
Lazio	43 single-member constituencies 14 proportional seats	Lazio 2		4. Frosinone	Frosinone
Lazio	43 single-member constituencies 14 proportional seats	Lazio 2		5. Alatri	Alatri
Lazio	43 single-member constituencies 14 proportional seats	Lazio 2		6. Sora	Sora
Lazio	43 single-member constituencies 14 proportional seats	Lazio 2		7. Cassino	Cassino
Lazio	43 single-member constituencies 14 proportional seats	Lazio 2		8. Latina	Latina
Lazio	43 single-member constituencies 14 proportional seats	Lazio 2		9. Aprilia	Aprilia
Lazio	43 single-member constituencies 14 proportional seats	Lazio 2		10. Terracina	Terracina
Lazio	43 single-member constituencies 14 proportional seats	Lazio 2		11. Formia	Formia
Abruzzo	11 single-member constituencies 3 proportional seats	Abruzzo		1. L'Aquila	L'Aquila
Abruzzo	11 single-member constituencies 3 proportional seats	Abruzzo		2. Avezzano	Avezzano
Abruzzo	11 single-member constituencies 3 proportional seats	Abruzzo		3. Sulmona	Sulmona
Abruzzo	11 single-member constituencies 3 proportional seats	Abruzzo		4. Teramo	Teramo
Abruzzo	11 single-member constituencies 3 proportional seats	Abruzzo		5. Giulianova	Giulianova
Abruzzo	11 single-member constituencies 3 proportional seats	Abruzzo		6. Chieti	Chieti
Abruzzo	11 single-member constituencies 3 proportional seats	Abruzzo		7. Lanciano	Lanciano
Abruzzo	11 single-member constituencies 3 proportional seats	Abruzzo		8. Ortona	Ortona
Abruzzo	11 single-member constituencies 3 proportional seats	Abruzzo		9. Vasto	Vasto
Abruzzo	11 single-member constituencies 3 proportional seats	Abruzzo		10. Pescara	Pescara
Abruzzo	11 single-member constituencies 3 proportional seats	Abruzzo		11. Montesilvano	Montesilvano
Molise	3 single-member constituencies 1 proportional seat	Molise		1. Campobasso	Campobasso
Molise	3 single-member constituencies 1 proportional seat	Molise		2. Isernia	Isernia
Molise	3 single-member constituencies 1 proportional seat	Molise		3. Termoli	Termoli
Campania	47 single-member constituencies 15 proportional seats	Campania 1		1. Naples - Ischia	Naples
Campania	47 single-member constituencies 15 proportional seats	Campania 1		2. Naples - Vomero	Naples
Campania	47 single-member constituencies 15 proportional seats	Campania 1		3. Naples - Fuorigrotta	Naples
Campania	47 single-member constituencies 15 proportional seats	Campania 1		4. Naples - Pianura	Naples
Campania	47 single-member constituencies 15 proportional seats	Campania 1		5. Naples - Arenella	Naples
Campania	47 single-member constituencies 15 proportional seats	Campania 1		6. Naples - San Lorenzo	Naples
Campania	47 single-member constituencies 15 proportional seats	Campania 1		7. Naples - San Carlo Arena	Naples
Campania	47 single-member constituencies 15 proportional seats	Campania 1		8. Naples - Secondigliano	Naples
Campania	47 single-member constituencies 15 proportional seats	Campania 1		9. Naples - Ponticelli	Naples
Campania	47 single-member constituencies 15 proportional seats	Campania 1		10. Pozzuoli	Pozzuoli
Campania	47 single-member constituencies 15 proportional seats	Campania 1		11. Giugliano in Campania	Giugliano in Campania
Campania	47 single-member constituencies 15 proportional seats	Campania 1		12. Marano di Napoli	Marano di Napoli
Campania	47 single-member constituencies 15 proportional seats	Campania 1		13. Arzano	Arzano
Campania	47 single-member constituencies 15 proportional seats	Campania 1		14. Casoria	Casoria
Campania	47 single-member constituencies 15 proportional seats	Campania 1		15. Afragola	Afragola
Campania	47 single-member constituencies 15 proportional seats	Campania 1		16. Acerra	Acerra
Campania	47 single-member constituencies 15 proportional seats	Campania 1		17. Pomigliano d'Arco	Pomigliano d'Arco
Campania	47 single-member constituencies 15 proportional seats	Campania 1		18. Nola	Nola
Campania	47 single-member constituencies 15 proportional seats	Campania 1		19. San Giuseppe Vesuviano	San Giuseppe Vesuviano
Campania	47 single-member constituencies 15 proportional seats	Campania 1		20. Torre Annunziata	Torre Annunziata
Campania	47 single-member constituencies 15 proportional seats	Campania 1		21. Castellammare di Stabia	Castellammare di Stabia
Campania	47 single-member constituencies 15 proportional seats	Campania 1		22. Gragnano	Gragnano
Campania	47 single-member constituencies 15 proportional seats	Campania 1		23. Torre del Greco	Torre del Greco
Campania	47 single-member constituencies 15 proportional seats	Campania 1		24. Portici	Portici
Campania	47 single-member constituencies 15 proportional seats	Campania 1		25. San Giorgio a Cremano	San Giorgio a Cremano
Campania	47 single-member constituencies 15 proportional seats	Campania 2		1. Caserta	Caserta
Campania	47 single-member constituencies 15 proportional seats	Campania 2		2. Maddaloni	Maddaloni
Campania	47 single-member constituencies 15 proportional seats	Campania 2		3. Aversa	Aversa
Campania	47 single-member constituencies 15 proportional seats	Campania 2		4. Casal di Principe	Casal di Principe
Campania	47 single-member constituencies 15 proportional seats	Campania 2		5. Santa Maria Capua Vetere	Santa Maria Capua Vetere
Campania	47 single-member constituencies 15 proportional seats	Campania 2		6. Sessa Aurunca	Sessa Aurunca
Campania	47 single-member constituencies 15 proportional seats	Campania 2		7. Capua	Capua
Campania	47 single-member constituencies 15 proportional seats	Campania 2		8. Benevento	Benevento
Campania	47 single-member constituencies 15 proportional seats	Campania 2		9. Sant'Agata de' Goti	Sant'Agata de' Goti
Campania	47 single-member constituencies 15 proportional seats	Campania 2		10. Ariano Irpino	Ariano Irpino
Campania	47 single-member constituencies 15 proportional seats	Campania 2		11. Avellino	Avellino
Campania	47 single-member constituencies 15 proportional seats	Campania 2		12. Atripalda	Atripalda
Campania	47 single-member constituencies 15 proportional seats	Campania 2		13. Mirabella Eclano	Mirabella Eclano
Campania	47 single-member constituencies 15 proportional seats	Campania 2		14. Salerno Centre	Salerno
Campania	47 single-member constituencies 15 proportional seats	Campania 2		15. Salerno - Mercato San Severino	Salerno
Campania	47 single-member constituencies 15 proportional seats	Campania 2		16. Cava de' Tirreni	Cava de' Tirreni
Campania	47 single-member constituencies 15 proportional seats	Campania 2		17. Scafati	Scafati
Campania	47 single-member constituencies 15 proportional seats	Campania 2		18. Nocera Inferiore	Nocera Inferiore
Campania	47 single-member constituencies 15 proportional seats	Campania 2		19. Battipaglia	Battipaglia
Campania	47 single-member constituencies 15 proportional seats	Campania 2		20. Eboli	Eboli
Campania	47 single-member constituencies 15 proportional seats	Campania 2		21. Sala Consilina	Sala Consilina
Campania	47 single-member constituencies 15 proportional seats	Campania 2		22. Vallo della Lucania	Vallo della Lucania
Apulia	34 single-member constituencies 11 proportional seats	Apulia		1. San Severo	San Severo
Apulia	34 single-member constituencies 11 proportional seats	Apulia		2. San Giovanni Rotondo	San Giovanni Rotondo
Apulia	34 single-member constituencies 11 proportional seats	Apulia		3. Foggia - Lucera	Foggia
Apulia	34 single-member constituencies 11 proportional seats	Apulia		4. Foggia Centre	Foggia
Apulia	34 single-member constituencies 11 proportional seats	Apulia		5. Cerignola	Cerignola
Apulia	34 single-member constituencies 11 proportional seats	Apulia		6. Manfredonia	Manfredonia
Apulia	34 single-member constituencies 11 proportional seats	Apulia		7. Lecce	Lecce
Apulia	34 single-member constituencies 11 proportional seats	Apulia		8. Squinzano	Squinzano
Apulia	34 single-member constituencies 11 proportional seats	Apulia		9. Tricase	Tricase
Apulia	34 single-member constituencies 11 proportional seats	Apulia		10. Maglie	Maglie
Apulia	34 single-member constituencies 11 proportional seats	Apulia		11. Cerignola	Casarano
Apulia	34 single-member constituencies 11 proportional seats	Apulia		12. Nardò	Nardò
Apulia	34 single-member constituencies 11 proportional seats	Apulia		13. Galatina	Galatina
Apulia	34 single-member constituencies 11 proportional seats	Apulia		14. Taranto - Solito Corvisea	Taranto
Apulia	34 single-member constituencies 11 proportional seats	Apulia		15. Taranto - Italia - Monte Granaro	Taranto
Apulia	34 single-member constituencies 11 proportional seats	Apulia		16. Manduria	Manduria
Apulia	34 single-member constituencies 11 proportional seats	Apulia		17. Martina Franca	Martina Franca
Apulia	34 single-member constituencies 11 proportional seats	Apulia		18. Massafra	Massafra
Apulia	34 single-member constituencies 11 proportional seats	Apulia		19. Bari - San Paolo - Stanic	Bari
Apulia	34 single-member constituencies 11 proportional seats	Apulia		20. Bari - Libertà - Marconi	Bari
Apulia	34 single-member constituencies 11 proportional seats	Apulia		21. Bari - Mola di Bari	Bari
Apulia	34 single-member constituencies 11 proportional seats	Apulia		22. Barletta	Barletta
Apulia	34 single-member constituencies 11 proportional seats	Apulia		23. Andria	Andria
Apulia	34 single-member constituencies 11 proportional seats	Apulia		24. Trani	Trani
Apulia	34 single-member constituencies 11 proportional seats	Apulia		25. Molfetta	Molfetta
Apulia	34 single-member constituencies 11 proportional seats	Apulia		26. Bitonto	Bitonto
Apulia	34 single-member constituencies 11 proportional seats	Apulia		27. Altamura	Altamura
Apulia	34 single-member constituencies 11 proportional seats	Apulia		28. Modugno	Modugno
Apulia	34 single-member constituencies 11 proportional seats	Apulia		29. Triggiano	Triggiano
Apulia	34 single-member constituencies 11 proportional seats	Apulia		30. Putignano	Putignano
Apulia	34 single-member constituencies 11 proportional seats	Apulia		31. Monopoli	Monopoli
Apulia	34 single-member constituencies 11 proportional seats	Apulia		32. Brindisi	Brindisi
Apulia	34 single-member constituencies 11 proportional seats	Apulia		33. Mesagne	Mesagne
Apulia	34 single-member constituencies 11 proportional seats	Apulia		34. Francavilla Fontana	Francavilla Fontana
Basilicata	5 single-member constituencies 2 proportional seats	Basilicata		1. Potenza	Potenza
Basilicata	5 single-member constituencies 2 proportional seats	Basilicata		2. Melfi	Melfi
Basilicata	5 single-member constituencies 2 proportional seats	Basilicata		3. Matera	Matera
Basilicata	5 single-member constituencies 2 proportional seats	Basilicata		4. Pisticci	Pisticci
Basilicata	5 single-member constituencies 2 proportional seats	Basilicata		5. Lauria	Lauria
Calabria	17 single-member constituencies 6 proportional seats	Calabria		1. Paola	Paola
Calabria	17 single-member constituencies 6 proportional seats	Calabria		2. Castrovillari	Castrovillari
Calabria	17 single-member constituencies 6 proportional seats	Calabria		3. Corigliano Calabro	Corigliano Calabro
Calabria	17 single-member constituencies 6 proportional seats	Calabria		4. Rossano	Rossano
Calabria	17 single-member constituencies 6 proportional seats	Calabria		5. Rende	Rende
Calabria	17 single-member constituencies 6 proportional seats	Calabria		6. Cosenza	Cosenza
Calabria	17 single-member constituencies 6 proportional seats	Calabria		7. Lamezia Terme	Lamezia Terme
Calabria	17 single-member constituencies 6 proportional seats	Calabria		8. Catanzaro	Catanzaro
Calabria	17 single-member constituencies 6 proportional seats	Calabria		9. Isola di Capo Rizzuto	Isola di Capo Rizzuto
Calabria	17 single-member constituencies 6 proportional seats	Calabria		10. Crotone	Crotone
Calabria	17 single-member constituencies 6 proportional seats	Calabria		11. Vibo Valentia	Vibo Valentia
Calabria	17 single-member constituencies 6 proportional seats	Calabria		12. Soverato	Soverato
Calabria	17 single-member constituencies 6 proportional seats	Calabria		13. Siderno	Siderno
Calabria	17 single-member constituencies 6 proportional seats	Calabria		14. Locri	Locri
Calabria	17 single-member constituencies 6 proportional seats	Calabria		15. Reggio Calabria - Sbarre	Reggio Calabria
Calabria	17 single-member constituencies 6 proportional seats	Calabria		16. Reggio Calabria - Villa San Giovanni	Reggio Calabria
Calabria	17 single-member constituencies 6 proportional seats	Calabria		17. Palmi	Palmi
Sicily	41 single-member constituencies 14 proportional seats	Sicily 1		1. Trapani	Trapani
Sicily	41 single-member constituencies 14 proportional seats	Sicily 1		2. Marsala	Marsala
Sicily	41 single-member constituencies 14 proportional seats	Sicily 1		3. Mazara del Vallo	Mazara del Vallo
Sicily	41 single-member constituencies 14 proportional seats	Sicily 1		4. Alcamo	Alcamo
Sicily	41 single-member constituencies 14 proportional seats	Sicily 1		5. Cefalù	Cefalù
Sicily	41 single-member constituencies 14 proportional seats	Sicily 1		6. Termini Imerese	Termini Imerese
Sicily	41 single-member constituencies 14 proportional seats	Sicily 1		7. Bagheria	Bagheria
Sicily	41 single-member constituencies 14 proportional seats	Sicily 1		8. Partinico	Partinico
Sicily	41 single-member constituencies 14 proportional seats	Sicily 1		9. Palermo - Capaci	Palermo
Sicily	41 single-member constituencies 14 proportional seats	Sicily 1		10. Palermo - Resuttana	Palermo
Sicily	41 single-member constituencies 14 proportional seats	Sicily 1		11. Palermo - Zisa	Palermo
Sicily	41 single-member constituencies 14 proportional seats	Sicily 1		12. Palermo - Libertà	Palermo
Sicily	41 single-member constituencies 14 proportional seats	Sicily 1		13. Palermo - Villagrazia	Palermo
Sicily	41 single-member constituencies 14 proportional seats	Sicily 1		14. Palermo - Settecannoli	Palermo
Sicily	41 single-member constituencies 14 proportional seats	Sicily 1		15. Gela	Gela
Sicily	41 single-member constituencies 14 proportional seats	Sicily 1		16. Caltanissetta	Caltanissetta
Sicily	41 single-member constituencies 14 proportional seats	Sicily 1		17. Licata	Licata
Sicily	41 single-member constituencies 14 proportional seats	Sicily 1		18. Agrigento	Agrigento
Sicily	41 single-member constituencies 14 proportional seats	Sicily 1		19. Canicattì	Canicattì
Sicily	41 single-member constituencies 14 proportional seats	Sicily 1		20. Sciacca	Sciacca
Sicily	41 single-member constituencies 14 proportional seats	Sicily 2		1. Messina Historic Centre	Messina
Sicily	41 single-member constituencies 14 proportional seats	Sicily 2		2. Messina - Mata and Grifone]	Messina
Sicily	41 single-member constituencies 14 proportional seats	Sicily 2		3. Taormina	Taormina
Sicily	41 single-member constituencies 14 proportional seats	Sicily 2		4. Milazzo	Milazzo
Sicily	41 single-member constituencies 14 proportional seats	Sicily 2		5. Barcellona Pozzo di Gotto	Barcellona Pozzo di Gotto
Sicily	41 single-member constituencies 14 proportional seats	Sicily 2		6. Nicosia	Nicosia
Sicily	41 single-member constituencies 14 proportional seats	Sicily 2		6. Enna	Enna
Sicily	41 single-member constituencies 14 proportional seats	Sicily 2		6. Paternò	Paternò
Sicily	41 single-member constituencies 14 proportional seats	Sicily 2		6. Giarre	Giarre
Sicily	41 single-member constituencies 14 proportional seats	Sicily 2		10. Acireale	Acireale
Sicily	41 single-member constituencies 14 proportional seats	Sicily 2		11. Gravina di Catania	Gravina di Catania
Sicily	41 single-member constituencies 14 proportional seats	Sicily 2		12. Catania – Picanello	Catania
Sicily	41 single-member constituencies 14 proportional seats	Sicily 2		13. Catania – Cardinale	Catania
Sicily	41 single-member constituencies 14 proportional seats	Sicily 2		14. Catania – Misterbiancoa	Catania
Sicily	41 single-member constituencies 14 proportional seats	Sicily 2		15. Caltagirone	Caltagirone
Sicily	41 single-member constituencies 14 proportional seats	Sicily 2		16. Augusta	Augusta
Sicily	41 single-member constituencies 14 proportional seats	Sicily 2		17. Siracusa	Siracusa
Sicily	41 single-member constituencies 14 proportional seats	Sicily 2		18. Avola	Avola
Sicily	41 single-member constituencies 14 proportional seats	Sicily 2		19. Modica	Modica
Sicily	41 single-member constituencies 14 proportional seats	Sicily 2		20. Ragusa	Ragusa
Sicily	41 single-member constituencies 14 proportional seats	Sicily 2		21. Vittoria	Vittoria
Sardinia	14 single-member constituencies 4 proportional seats	Sardinia		1. Sassari	Sassari
Sardinia	14 single-member constituencies 4 proportional seats	Sardinia		2. Alghero	Alghero
Sardinia	14 single-member constituencies 4 proportional seats	Sardinia		3. Porto Torres	Porto Torres
Sardinia	14 single-member constituencies 4 proportional seats	Sardinia		4. Olbia	Olbia
Sardinia	14 single-member constituencies 4 proportional seats	Sardinia		5. Nuoro	Nuoro
Sardinia	14 single-member constituencies 4 proportional seats	Sardinia		6. Tortolì	Tortolì
Sardinia	14 single-member constituencies 4 proportional seats	Sardinia		7. Macomer	Macomer
Sardinia	14 single-member constituencies 4 proportional seats	Sardinia		8. Oristano	Oristano
Sardinia	14 single-member constituencies 4 proportional seats	Sardinia		9. Iglesias	Iglesias
Sardinia	14 single-member constituencies 4 proportional seats	Sardinia		10. Carbonia	Carbonia
Sardinia	14 single-member constituencies 4 proportional seats	Sardinia		11. Cagliari – Assemini	Cagliari
Sardinia	14 single-member constituencies 4 proportional seats	Sardinia		12. Cagliari Centre	Cagliari
Sardinia	14 single-member constituencies 4 proportional seats	Sardinia		13. Serramanna	Serramanna
Sardinia	14 single-member constituencies 4 proportional seats	Sardinia		14. Quartu Sant'Elena	Quartu Sant'Elena

== Results maps ==
1994 Italian general election	1996 Italian general election	2001 Italian general election

== See also ==
- List of Italian Chamber of Deputies multi-member constituencies (1994–2006)
- List of Italian Senate constituencies (1994–2006)
