= Capital (Marxism) =

Central concept in marxian critique of political economy

Capital is a central concept in Marxian critique of political economy, and in Marxian thought more generally.

Marxists view capital as a social relation reproduced by the continuous expenditure of wage labour. Labour and capital are viewed as historically specific forms of social relations, i.e. that the relations that constitute labour and capital arise in a given material and historical context.

Marx stated that "Capital is dead labour, that, vampire-like, only lives by sucking living labour, and lives the more, the more labour it sucks."

== See also ==
- Property is theft!
- Criticism of private property
- Reification (Marxism) – Treatment of social attributes as real, in Marxist theory
- Forms of capital in Marxism:
  - Constant capital — Capital invested in the means of production.
  - Variable capital — Capital invested in labour power.
  - Fictitious capital – Marxist doctrine
  - Monopoly Capital

Key figures:

- Robert Kurz
- Moishe Postone
- Roman Rosdolsky
