= Vera Ferra-Mikura =

Austrian writer

Vera Ferra-Mikura

Vera Ferra-Mikura (February 14, 1923 – March 9, 1997) was an Austrian writer best known for her children's stories.

She was born Vera Ferra in Vienna. After completing her schooling, she worked in her family's bird shop and then in a Vienna department store. During World War II, Ferra-Mikura worked as a stenographer for an architect; after the war, she worked for a publishing house. In 1948, she married Ludwig Mikura. In the same year, she became a freelance writer.

Her stories, inspired by fairy tales, are characterized by magic realism.

In 1951, she received a Förderungspreis of the City of Vienna. She received an award from the International Board on Books for Young People in 1976.

In 1988, she received the Gold award of the Ehrenmedaille der Bundeshauptstadt Wien for youth literature. Ferra-Mikura was also awarded the Theodor Körner Prize.

Ferra-Mikura died in Vienna at the age of 74.

== Selected works ==
- Melodie am Morgen, poetry (1946)
- Melodie am Morgen, novel (1947)
- Zaubermeister Opequeh, children's literature (1956)
- Unsere drei Stanisläuse, children's literature (1963), received the Youth literature prize of the City of Vienna
- Die zehn kleinen Negerlein (1958)
- Das Luftschloß des Herrn Wuschelkopf (1965)
- Das Sprachbastelbuch (1975), co-author
- Update on Rumpelstiltskin and other Fairy Tales by 43 Authors (1976), Illustrated by Willi Glasauer
- Die Oma gibt dem Meer die Hand (1982)
- Horoskop für den Löwen (1982)
