= Vermezzo =

- Comune
- Comune di Vermezzo
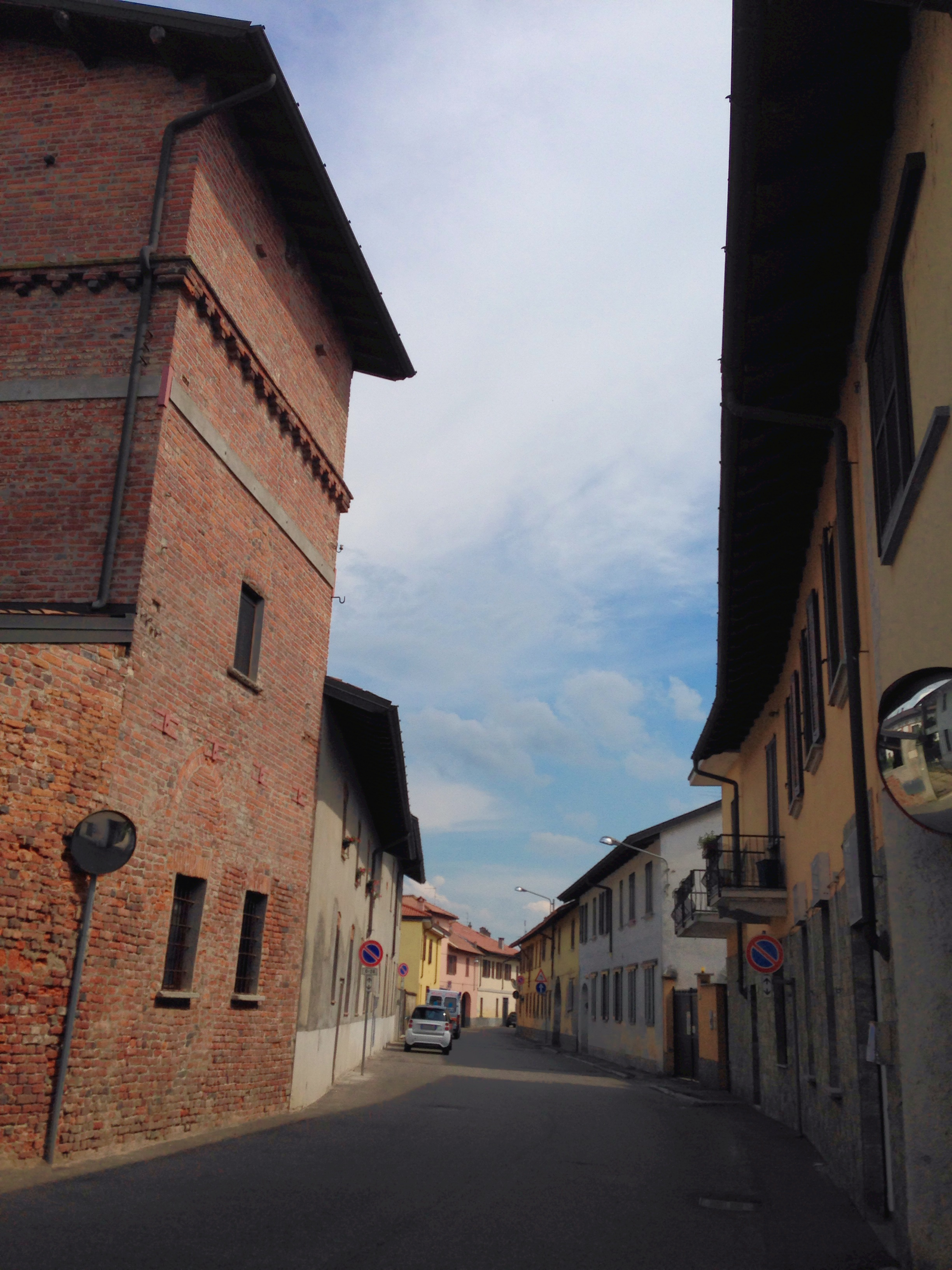

- Location within Italy Location within Lombardy
- Coordinates: 45°24′N 8°58′E
- Country: Italy
- Region: Lombardy
- Metropolitan city: Milan (MI)

Government
  - Mayor: Andrea Cipullo

Area
  - Total: 6.31 km^{2} (2.44 sq mi)
- Elevation: 111 m (364 ft)

Population (31 December 2017)
  - Total: 3,943
  - Density: 625/km^{2} (1,620/sq mi)
- Demonym: Vermezzesi
- Time zone: UTC+1 (CET)
  - Summer (DST): UTC+2 (CEST)
- Postal code: 20080
- Dialing code: 02
- Website: Official website

Vermezzo (Lombard: Vermezz [ʋerˈmɛs]) is a locality part of the comune (municipality) of Vermezzo con Zelo in the Metropolitan City of Milan in the Italian region Lombardy, located about 15 kilometres (9 mi) southwest of Milan.

Vermezzo borders the following municipalities: Albairate, Gaggiano, Abbiategrasso, Gudo Visconti, Zelo Surrigone, Morimondo.

Vermezzo is served by Albairate-Vermezzo railway station.

== Main sights ==
The Church of Saint Zeno is a Baroque church dating from the 17th-18th centuries. The interior of the church has several notable frescos.

The Palazzo Pozzobonelli Panigarola, located in Vermezzo's main square, was built on the remnants of the local castle by the Pozzobonelli House. In the late 15th century it was acquired by Gustavo Panigarola, an officer of Ludovico il Moro, who had it renovated and decorated with frescos inspired by the style of Leonardo da Vinci and Bramante. In the 18th Century the building returned to the Pozzebonelli House, and became the summer residence of Cardinal Giuseppe Pozzobonelli. The building is now owned by the Lattuada family.

The Cascina Grande ("Big Cascina") is an ancient farmhouse that also used to belong to the Pozzobonelli House. It was thoroughly restored in 1920 by Ovidio Capelli, then Mayor of Vermezzo, who had the internal courtyard decorated with a scaled-down reproduction of the towers of Milan's Sforza Castle.
