= Willi Glasauer =

German illustrator (born 1938)

Willi Glasauer (born 9 December 1938) is a German illustrator of books for children. He was born in Stříbro.

== Works ==
- Better than Laughter (1976), written by Chester Aaron and Irmela Brender, illustrated by Willi Glasauer, published by Beltz & Gelberg
- Update on Rumpelstiltskin and other Fairy Tales by 43 Authors (1976), compiled by Hans-Joachim Gelberg, written by Iring Fetscher, Alfons Schweiggert, Rolf Krenzer, Günter Kunert, Rosemarie Künzler-Behncke, Hans-Georg Lenzen, Josef Wittmann, Wolf Wondratschek, Werner Schmoll, Hans-Joachim Gelberg, Janosch, Richard Bletschacher, Reiner Kunze, Max Bolliger, Christa Reinig, Friedl Hofbauer, Rudolf Otto Wiemer, Jörg Steiner, Kurt Kusenberg, Peter Härtling, Josef Guggenmos, Ota Filip, Irmela Brender, Karlhans Frank, Achim Bröger, Luděk Pešek, Wolfgang Weyrauch, Vera Ferra-Mikura, Nicolas Born, Hildegard Wohlgemuth, Günter Bruno Fuchs, Franz Fühmann, Ernst A. Ekker, Michael Kumpe, Oskar Maria Graf, Agathe Keller, Lotte Betke, Doris Mühringer, Dagmar Chidolue, Yuri Korinets, Michael Ende, Béatrice Tanaka, and André Heller, illustrated by Willi Glasauer, published by Beltz & Gelberg
