= Erwin Moser =

Austrian children's writer and illustrator (1954-2017)

- Born: 23 January 1954; Vienna, Austria
- Died: 11 October 2017 (aged 63)
- Occupations: Austrian author and illustrator

Erwin Moser (23 January 1954 – 11 October 2017) was an Austrian children's and young adult books' author and illustrator. He is best known for his children's book series Manuel & Didi, which he illustrated himself, using a text comics format.

== Awards and recognition ==
- 1987 Owl Prize for Der Rabe im Schnee (The Raven in the Snow)
- 1992 Rattenfänger-Literaturpreis (Pied Piper Literature Prize) for Der Rabe Alfons (Alfons the Raven)
- 2013 Goldene Verdienstzeichen des Landes Wien (Golden Order of Merit of the Province of Vienna)....

== Bibliography ==
- Jenseits der großen Sümpfe, 1980
- The City meets the Country (Compiled by Hans-Joachim Gelberg, Published by Beltz & Gelberg), 1980
- Großvaters Geschichten oder das Bett mit den fliegenden Bäumen, 1981
- Ein Käfer wie ich – Erinnerungen eines Mehlkäfers aus dem Burgenland, 1982
- Der Mond hinter den Scheunen – Eine lange Fabel von Katzen, Mäusen und Ratzen, 1982
- Die Geschichte von Philip Schnauze, 1982
- Mein Baumhaus, 1983
- Ich und der Wassermann – Wahre Traumgeschichten, 1983
- Der Roboter Max und andere merkwürdige Geschichten, 1983
- Das verzauberte Bilderbuch, 1984
- Der einsame Frosch – Fabelhafte Geschichten, 1984
- Eisbär, Erdbär und Mausbär, 1984
- Die fliegende Schnecke & andere seltsame Geschichten, 1984
- Winzig, der Elefant, 1985
- Geschichten aus der Flasche im Meer, 1985
- Das Katzen-ABC, 1985
- Das kleine Mäusealbum, 1985
- Ein aufregender Tag im Leben von Franz Feldmaus, 1986
- Katzenkönig Mauzenberger, 1986
- Paulis Traumreise, 1986
- Der Rabe im Schnee – Gute-Nacht-Geschichten, 1986
- Der Bärenschatz – Die Abenteuer von Manuel, dem Mäuserich, und seinem Freund Didi, 1986
- Der Tintenfisch sitzt in der Tinte, 1987
- Manuel & Didi – Die Baumhütte – Kleine Mäuseabenteuer, 1987
- Manuel & Didi – Der fliegende Hut – Kleine Mäuseabenteuer, 1987
- Manuel & Didi – Der grosse Pilz – Kleine Mäuseabenteuer, 1987
- Manuel & Didi – Der Schneemensch – Kleine Mäuseabenteuer, 1987
- Der Dachs schreibt hier bei Kerzenlicht – Kleine Tierkunde, 1987
- Winzig geht in die Wüste, 1987
- Winzig sucht die Elefanten, 1988
- Das Haus auf dem fliegenden Felsen, 1988
- Edi Nußknacker und Lili Weißwieschnee, 1988
- Ein seltsamer Gast – Gute-Nacht-Geschichten, 1988
- Tierisches von A bis Z, 1988
- Wer küsst den Frosch?, 1988
- Wie geht’s dem Schwein?, 1988
- Winzig findet seine Eltern, 1989
- Die drei kleinen Eulen und sieben andere Geschichten, 1989
- Das Fabulierbuch, 1989
- Sultan Mudschi – Gute-Nacht-Geschichten, 1989
- Gute Nacht, kleiner Igel, 1989
- Guten Tag, lieber Bär!, 1989
- Was macht der Bär?, 1989
- Wo schläft die Maus?, 1989
- König Löwe, 1990
- Guten Morgen, Herr Kater!, 1990
- Guten Abend, Frau Eule!, 1990
- Der Rabe Alfons, 1990
- Diese Maus heißt Friederich, 1990
- Das schöne Bärenleben, 1990
- Die Wüstenmäuse, 1990
- Der Bär und seine Freunde, 1991
- Der glückliche Bär, 1991
- Die Geschichten von der Maus, vom Frosch und vom Schwein, 1991
- Die Geschichte von der Gehmaschine, 1991
- Der Siebenschläfer – Gute-Nacht-Geschichten, 1991
- Dicker Kater Kasimir, 1992
- Kleine Katze Nina, 1992
- Der karierte Uhu – Gute-Nacht-Geschichten, 1992
- Schlaf gut, Murmeltier!, 1992
- Hallo, Eichhörnchen!, 1992
- Manuel & Didi – Der blaue Turban – Kleine Mäuseabenteuer im Sommer, 1992
- Manuel & Didi – Der Lehnstuhl – Kleine Mäuseabenteuer, 1992
- Manuel & Didi – Das Maisauto – Kleine Mäuseabenteuer im Herbst, 1992
- Manuel & Didi – Die Schneekatze – Kleine Mäuseabenteuer im Winter, 1992
- Koko mit dem Zauberschirm, 1992. Auch als Figurentheater im Figurentheater LILARUM (Uraufführung June 1999)
- Koko und der weiße Vogel, 1993. Auch als Figurentheater im Figurentheater LILARUM (Uraufführung November 2000)
- Koko und seine Freundin Kiri, 1993. Auch als Figurentheater im Figurentheater LILARUM (Uraufführung May 2001)
- Winzig – Das große Buch vom kleinen Elefanten, 1993
- Joschi Tintenkatz, 1993
- Der Mäusezirkus, 1993
- Wunderbare Bärenzeit, 1993
- Koko und der fliegende Teppich, 1994
- Der glückliche Biber, 1994
- Das Findelkind – Gute-Nacht-Geschichten, 1994
- Pepe Pinguin, 1994
- Violetta, die Maus, 1994
- Die Igelkinder, 1995
- Das große Fabulierbuch, 1995
- Kleine Katzenwelt, 1995
- Das kleine Kürbisboot, 1995
- Bolo, der kleine Elefant, 1996
- Die fliegende Kiste, 1996
- Mario der Bär – Gute-Nacht-Geschichten, 1996
- Klitzekleine Schneegeschichten, 1996
- Die Maus im All, 1996
- Die geheimnisvolle Eule – Gute-Nacht-Geschichten, 1997
- Die Mäusepiraten, 1997
- Max der Roboter, 1997
- Traumboot – Ausgewählte Gute-Nacht-Geschichten, 1997
- Das Mäuse-ABC, 1998
- Hugo der Hamster, 1998
- Mondballon – Ausgewählte Gute-Nacht-Geschichten, 1998
- Die Abenteuer von Manuel und Didi – Frühlingsgeschichten, 1998
- Die Abenteuer von Manuel und Didi – Sommergeschichten, 1998
- Manuel & Didi – Das große Buch der kleinen Mäuseabenteuer, 1998
- Die Abenteuer von Manuel und Didi – Herbstgeschichten, 1999
- Die Abenteuer von Manuel und Didi – Wintergeschichten, 1999
- Manuel & Didi – Das zweite große Buch der kleinen Mäuseabenteuer, 1999
- Manuel & Didi helfen den Krähen, 1999
- Manuel & Didi und die Schildkröte, 1999
- Der Mäusejaguar – Gute-Nacht-Geschichten, 1999
- Konrad der Schneemensch, 1999
- Das Weihnachtsgeschenk, 1999
- In allem ist eine Geschichte verborgen, 2000
- Wunderbare Bärenzeit, 2000
- Der sanfte Drache – Gute-Nacht-Geschichten, 2001
- Guten Morgen, Herr Kater, 2001
- Die Erdmaus und der Regenschirm, 2002
- Plim der Clown – Gute-Nacht-Geschichten, 2002
- Eddy und seine Freunde, 2005
- So im Schatten liegen möcht ich, 2006
- Das große Buch von Koko und Kiri, 2010
- Wo wohnt die Maus? Frühlings- und Sommergeschichten, 2011
