= Moishe Postone =

Canadian social theorist and historian (1942–2018)

- Postone in 2009
- Born: April 17, 1942; Edmonton, Alberta, Canada
- Died: March 19, 2018 (aged 75); Chicago, Illinois, U.S.

Academic background
- Education: University of Chicago; Goethe University Frankfurt
- Thesis: The Present as Necessity (1983)
- Doctoral advisor: Iring Fetscher, Heinz Steinert, Albrecht Wellmer
- Influences: G. W. F. Hegel, Karl Marx, György Lukács, Isaak Illich Rubin, Max Weber, Herbert Marcuse, Theodor W. Adorno, Alfred Sohn-Rethel

Academic work
- Discipline: History, sociology
- Sub-discipline: 20th-century German history, modern European intellectual history, social theory
- School or tradition: Critical theory
- Institutions: University of Chicago
- Doctoral students: Catherine Chatterley, Loïc Wacquant
- Notable works: Time, Labor and Social Domination (1993)
- Influenced: Martin Hägglund, Gáspár Miklós Tamás

Moishe Postone (April 17, 1942 – March 19, 2018) was a Canadian social theorist, historian, and professor of history at the University of Chicago. He is best known for his influential reinterpretation of Karl Marx's critique of political economy, articulated in his magnum opus, Time, Labor and Social Domination (1993).

Postone's work challenges fundamental tenets of Marxist thought. He argued that "traditional Marxism" misunderstands Marx's mature theory by framing it as a critique of capitalism from the "standpoint of labor"; Postone instead proposed that Marx's theory is a critique of labor in capitalism itself. According to him, the core problem of capitalism is not class exploitation based on market relations and private property, but a historically unique form of "abstract domination" by impersonal social structures that individuals themselves constitute. This domination is driven by the contradictory logic of capital, which he characterized as a "treadmill" dynamic that generates increasing material wealth alongside growing social precarity. Postone also applied his theoretical framework to analyze modern antisemitism, which he controversially described as a fetishized, one-sided form of anticapitalism.

== Early life and education ==
Moishe Postone was born on April 17, 1942, in Edmonton, Alberta, Canada, the oldest son of Evelyn and Abraham Postone. His father was a modern Orthodox rabbi, and his parents, who had met in a Jewish choir in Winnipeg, were immigrants from Eastern Europe. His mother had emigrated from Ukraine in the 1920s, and his father from Lithuania shortly before the outbreak of World War II. The rest of his father's immediate family perished in the Holocaust. Postone's Jewish heritage was a profound influence on his life and thought. As a teenager, he attended a residential Jewish high school (yeshiva) on the west side of Chicago. He remained a practicing Jew throughout his life, despite his secular and rationalist intellectual tastes, and as an adult was a devoted member of Congregation Rodfei Zedek in Chicago's Hyde Park neighborhood.

Postone enrolled as an undergraduate at the University of Chicago, where he experienced the interdisciplinary, discussion-based Core curriculum established by Robert Hutchins. He completed his bachelor's degree in biochemistry with a minor in history. His encounter with Marx's Economic and Philosophic Manuscripts of 1844 sparked what he later described as a "sense of sensation" and an awakening to the world of social thought. Upon graduating in 1963, he was accepted with a four-year fellowship into the university's chemistry graduate program but quickly had second thoughts. He persuaded William McNeill, the chair of the history department, to transfer his fellowship, and he began graduate studies in modern European intellectual history with Leonard Krieger as his major professor. As a graduate student, Postone participated in a 1969 student sit-in at the university's Administration Building; in its aftermath, he led one of two student study groups that sought to understand the historical moment through social theory.

After passing his qualifying exams in 1969, Postone taught briefly at Brooklyn College and Richmond College in New York City before moving to Germany in 1973, first to Munich to improve his German and then to Frankfurt. He enrolled as a doctoral student at the Goethe University Frankfurt in the autumn of 1972, where the intellectual climate was shaped by the West German student movement, the Frankfurt School, and the emerging Neue Marx-Lektüre (New Marx Reading).

Postone's research on Marx's Grundrisse was deeply influenced by his discovery of the Frankfurt School's works, and he studied Marx and critical theory with former associates and assistants of Theodor Adorno, including Oskar Negt, Alfred Schmidt, Jürgen Ritsert, Gerhard Brandt, and Iring Fetscher. His intellectual approach during this period was distinctive: while his reading of Marx was informed by the critical theory tradition, he in turn began to reread the work of Adorno and Max Horkheimer through the lens of his new interpretation of Marx. He continued his doctoral work on the Marxian critique of labor and time with Fetscher, taught classes, and published contributions to public debates on antisemitism, the German Left, and the German politics of memory. He received his doctorate (DPhil) in political science/sociology in 1983. His dissertation served as the first draft of what would become Time, Labor, and Social Domination a decade later.

== Academic career ==
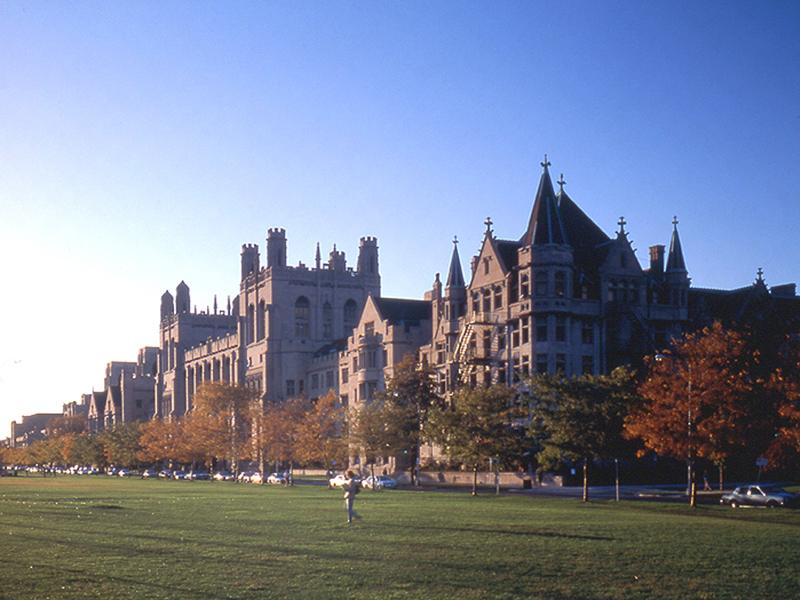
The University of Chicago, where Postone taught from 1987 until his death

Postone's academic career was unorthodox. In 1983, he returned to Chicago to join the Center for Psychosocial Studies, a small, privately funded think tank, where his colleagues included the sociologist Craig Calhoun and the philosopher Nancy Fraser. His first formal postdoctoral academic appointment came in 1987, at the age of 45, as a Harper Fellow and instructor in the Social Sciences Collegiate Division at the University of Chicago, where he taught in the "Self, Culture, and Society" core course. In 1990, he was promoted to an untenured associate professorship in the sociology department and became chair of the course, a position he held until 2016. The appointment in sociology was "never a comfortable fit," as the department had little use for social theory or Marxism. With his colleague William H. Sewell Jr., he co-founded an interdisciplinary Social Theory Workshop in 1992 that ran for 26 years. This workshop eventually led to the creation of the journal Critical Historical Studies in 2015, with Postone as a founding co-editor.

In 1995, two years after the publication of Time, Labor, and Social Domination, the department denied him promotion to tenure. The decision was met with protest from senior scholars at the university, including Sewell. Following the protest, the university's provost agreed to consider a tenured appointment if another department would sponsor it. The history department overwhelmingly voted to grant Postone a tenured associate professorship, recognizing him as an important asset to the university despite his work being philosophical and theoretical rather than archival. In 2012, Postone was appointed the Thomas E. Donnelley Professor in the Department of History and the College. He was also an associate of the Greenberg Center for Jewish Studies and a co-director of the Chicago Center for Contemporary Theory.

Postone remained an active member of the university for the rest of his career. He was known as a demanding and deeply influential teacher and mentor. His Socratic teaching style was described as a "transformative experience" by his students. He emphasized a pedagogical practice of "sympathetic reading," insisting that a strong argument is worthy of respect and that better arguments are built on engaging with the inadequacies of strong arguments, not on the "shattered remains of bad ones." In 1999, he won a Llewellyn John and Harriet Manchester Quantrell Award for Excellence in Undergraduate Teaching. Of his approach, he told the University of Chicago Chronicle, "I do not want students writing papers just for me, their teacher, but to take responsibility for communicating what they think". He served on the dissertation committees of over sixty graduate students. Postone also valued international collaboration. In addition to frequent engagements in Europe, he helped support visiting scholars and in the last decades of his life participated in forums in China, Taiwan, India, South Africa, Japan, and Brazil.

In 2006, Postone was diagnosed with cancer, which he fought for 12 years. He continued to teach, write, and organize during his illness; in 2016, he delivered the Vienna Prize Lecture at the International Research Center for Cultural Studies, and in the autumn of 2017 he gave a keynote address on right-wing populism at the Vienna Humanities Festival. Postone died on March 19, 2018, at the age of 75. He left behind several unfinished book projects, including a critical history of critical theory and an assessment of capitalism since the 1970s. His extensive collection of papers and books constitutes his Nachlass, which is in the process of being archived at the University of Chicago.

== Social theory ==
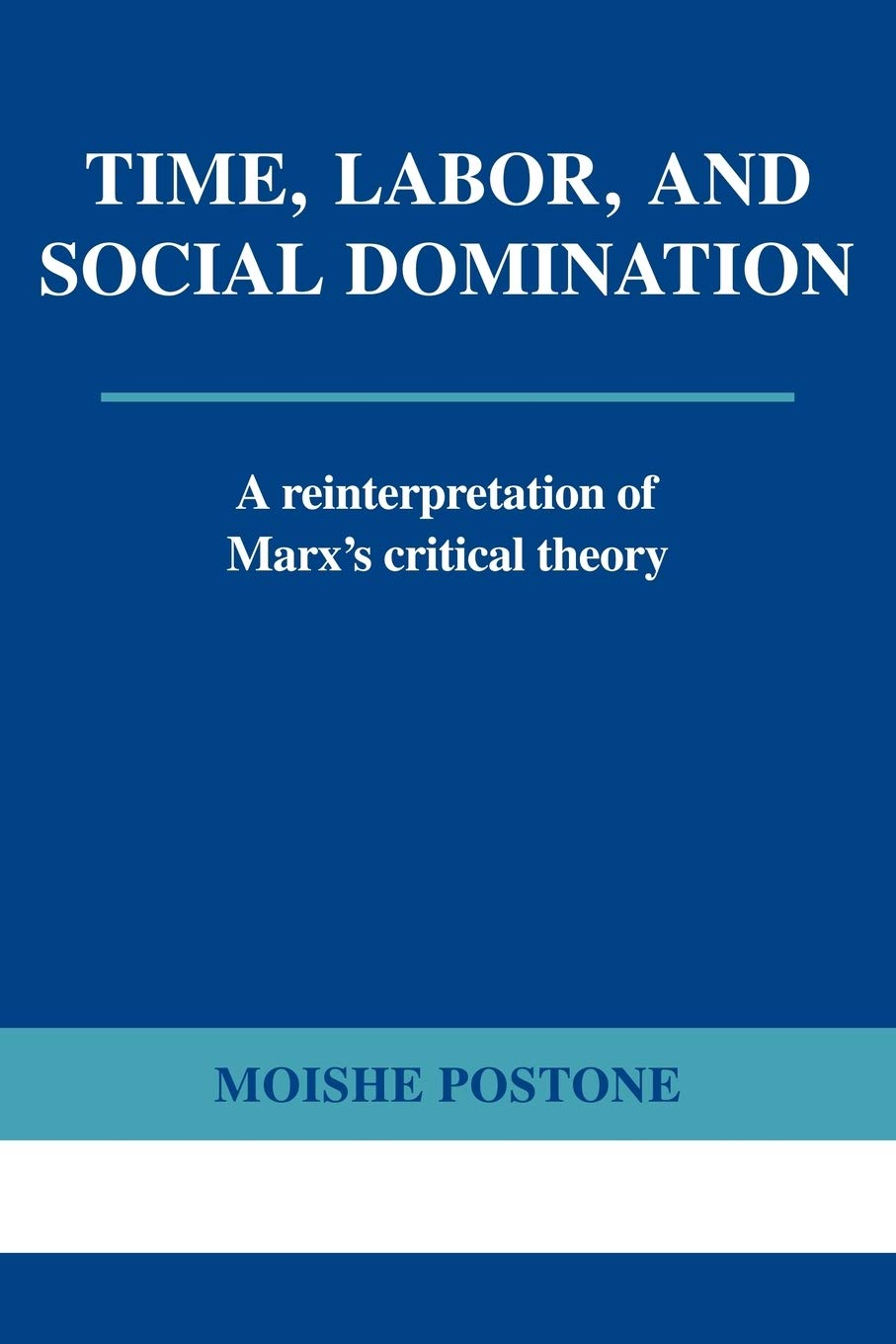
Cover of Time, Labor, and Social Domination (1993)

Postone's work is a fundamental re-examination of Karl Marx's mature critical theory. His magnum opus, Time, Labor and Social Domination (1993), was awarded the Theory Prize by the American Sociological Association in 1996 and has been translated into eight languages. Postone argued that Marx's work should not be understood as a critique of class exploitation from the viewpoint of labor, but as a critique of the historically specific character of labor itself in capitalism.

=== Critique of traditional Marxism ===
Postone defined "traditional Marxism" as a broad tendency in Marxist thought that misinterprets Marx's mature critique of capitalism. This tendency includes not only orthodox Marxism but also many of its critics, including certain thinkers of the Frankfurt School. According to Postone, traditional Marxism understands capitalism primarily as a system of class domination rooted in private ownership of the means of production and market-based distribution. He argued that this traditional view misunderstands Marx by framing the critique of capitalism from the "standpoint of labor". Postone instead proposed that Marx's theory is a critique of labor in capitalism itself.

In the traditional view, labor is understood as a transhistorical activity—the fundamental metabolic interaction between humanity and nature—that exists outside of and prior to capitalism. Emancipation is therefore conceived as the liberation of labor from the "fetters" of private property and the market. This traditional framework, Postone noted, was particularly evident in "Ricardian Marxism," such as the work of Paul Sweezy and Maurice Dobb, which focused on market relations and modes of distribution rather than the underlying forms of social labor. In Postone's terms, this traditional view constitutes a "positive" or "redemptive" critique of capitalism, which critiques what exists from the standpoint of what also exists (labor). This contrasts with the "negative critique" he found in Marx's mature work, which critiques what exists from the standpoint of what "could be"—the negation of the existing social conditions themselves.

Postone argued that this framework rendered traditional Marxism unable to adequately critique state-run socialist societies, which had abolished private property and the market but retained the fundamental character of capitalist labor. He also contended that the Frankfurt School's "pessimistic turn" in the mid-20th century stemmed from its residual attachment to this traditional framework. When the rise of state-managed capitalism ("postliberal capitalist society") seemed to resolve the contradiction between labor and the market, thinkers like Friedrich Pollock and Max Horkheimer concluded that capitalism had become a non-contradictory, "totally administered" society, losing its potential for emancipation.

=== Reinterpretation of Marx's critique ===
==== Abstract domination ====
Postone argued that the central categories of Marx's mature theory—commodity, capital, and labor—are specific to capitalism. He located the core of capitalism not in class exploitation but in the dual character of labor. In capitalism, labor has a dual function: it is both a specific, concrete activity (concrete labor) that produces useful goods (use-values), and it serves as a social mediation, a means by which individuals acquire the products of others (abstract labor). In developing this argument, Postone drew on the work of Isaak Rubin, who had argued that abstract labor is not a physiological concept but a unique social form of labor specific to capitalism. As the substance of value, abstract labor is a historically unique form of social interdependence that takes on a "socially synthetic character". Because of its unique mediating function, Postone argued that labor in capitalism "becomes its own social ground," a "self-grounding social mediation" that is the source of the social totality.

This system creates what Postone called "abstract domination": a form of domination exerted not directly by one class over another, but by impersonal social structures that individuals themselves constitute through their own labor. In this framework, capital—value in motion—becomes a quasi-independent "automatic subject" that structures society according to its own logic of endless accumulation, a concept Marx appropriates from Georg Wilhelm Friedrich Hegel's notion of Geist (Spirit) as a "self-moving subject." This domination is abstract and objective, affecting all members of society, capitalists and workers alike. Marx's critique, therefore, is not an affirmation of labor but a critique of the social order grounded upon it.

==== Temporal dynamics and contradiction ====
Diagram illustrating Postone's theory

Postone identified the central contradiction of capitalism in its unique temporal dynamic. Capitalist society is structured by abstract time: a uniform, continuous, and independent framework (the clock hour) that measures labor and constitutes value. However, the competitive drive for surplus-value compels producers to constantly increase productivity through technological innovation. This dynamic creates what Postone called a "treadmill effect." As productivity increases, more material wealth (use-values) can be produced in the same amount of time. However, because value is determined by socially necessary labor time, the value of each individual commodity decreases, and the total value produced in a given hour tends to remain constant. Producers must therefore continually increase productivity simply to "remain in place."

This process changes the very nature of the labor hour, making it "denser" with productive activity. Postone termed this change a "movement of time," which he called "historical time," as opposed to a "movement in time" (abstract time). This creates a growing contradiction between the material wealth being produced and the source of that wealth in capitalist terms—value, which is based on direct human labor time. As technology and science become the primary sources of wealth, value becomes an "anachronistic" measure, and labor as the foundation of society becomes increasingly obsolete. Postone drew this analysis of value as an "anachronism" from a section of Marx's Grundrisse known as the "Fragment on Machines." This contradiction, for Postone, signals the historical specificity and contingency of capitalism, grounding the possibility—but not the inevitability—of its transcendence.

=== Analysis of modern antisemitism ===
Postone applied his theory to analyze modern antisemitism, distinguishing it from older forms of religious anti-Judaism and from other forms of racism. While racism, he argued, projects negative qualities onto marginalized groups, antisemitism attributes to the Jews a hidden, abstract, and immensely powerful global agency that controls the world. This form of thought grasps capitalism only through its abstract dimension—the intangible, universal, and seemingly rootless power of finance capital and money. In this fetishized worldview, the concrete, tangible, and particular dimension of capitalism—such as industrial labor, agriculture, and national community—is perceived as natural, healthy, and non-capitalist. The antisemitic critique, therefore, allows for a paradoxical "romantic anticapitalism" that can embrace industrial technology and national labor while seeking to purge society of the perceived destructive influence of "Jewish" abstract finance. Because it appears to explain a complex world in terms of a concrete, conspiratorial power, Postone argued that modern antisemitism possesses a "pseudo-emancipatory" dimension that other forms of racism lack.

Postone saw these ideas manifested in some contemporary left-wing positions. He argued that a "fatal convergence" of historical currents had produced a form of anti-Zionism with antisemitic implications. He distinguished this from criticism of Israeli policy, focusing instead on the strand of thought that denies Israel's right to exist while accepting that of all other nations. He identified several sources for this position: an abstract universalism, rooted in some communist thought, that inconsistently opposes Jewish collective self-determination; the Soviet Union's post-World War II use of "Zionism" as a codeword for classic antisemitic tropes of a global conspiracy; and the recent reversal by some Palestinian movements and their left-wing supporters of the principle of a two-state solution. He was critical of the tendency on the left to project "huge and mysterious power" onto Israel, citing the "Jewish lobby" thesis promoted by figures like John Mearsheimer and Stephen Walt as a contemporary example of antisemitic thought that accords enormous global power to the Jews.

== Legacy and influence ==
Postone's work, particularly Time, Labor, and Social Domination, has had a major influence on Marxian theory, value-form theory, and social theory. He is considered a key figure in the German Neue Marx-Lektüre tradition and the related "value-critique" (Wertkritik) current. His interpretation challenged both orthodox Marxism and some assumptions of the Frankfurt School, aiming to renew Marx's critique as a theory adequate to the transformations of late 20th-century capitalism.

Postone's theory has also been subject to critique. Craig Calhoun suggested that Postone's emphasis on capitalism as a "totality" could obscure the importance of social relations and forms of work that are not fully subsumed by capital's logic, arguing that capital is "totalizing" but never fully total. Other critics have argued that his theory, by positing a single fundamental contradiction, creates a "tight unity" that makes it difficult to immanently ground a norm of freedom or locate sources of resistance within capitalism. Benjamin Tetler argues that Postone's framework relies on a pre-monetary theory of value, which leads to a "substantialist" conception of abstract labor as a real substance created in production prior to exchange. According to Tetler, this results in a disjuncture between the objective logic of capital (structure) and social antagonism (struggle), with class struggle being sidelined as a secondary, reactive phenomenon rather than a constitutive element of the system itself. Tetler also notes a "Proudhonian whiff" in Postone's concept of labor as "self-mediating," arguing that it fails to adequately account for the role of capital in mediating social relations through labor.

Some scholars have situated Postone's work within a tradition of "Jewish Marxism." William H. Sewell Jr. and Viren Murthy have argued that his deep Jewish heritage and rabbinical training unconsciously influenced his exegetical approach to Marx's texts and his non-teleological theory of history. Murthy suggests that Postone's conception of emancipation as a radical negation of the existing historical dynamic, rather than its fulfillment, echoes the structure of Jewish messianism as described by Gershom Scholem.

== Selected works ==
Books

- Critique du fétiche-capital: Le capitalisme, l’antisemitisme et la gauche. Paris: Presses Universitaires de France, 2013.
- History and Heteronomy: Critical Essays. Tokyo: University of Tokyo Center for Philosophy, 2009.
- Marx Reloaded. Repensar la teoría crítica del capitalismo. Madrid: Editorial Traficantes de Sueños, 2007.
- Deutschland, die Linke und der Holocaust - Politische Interventionen. Freiburg, Germany: Ca Ira Verlag, 2005.
- Catastrophe and Meaning: The Holocaust and the Twentieth Century. [Co-editor with Eric Santner] Chicago: University of Chicago Press, 2003.
- Marx est-il devenu muet: Face à la mondialisation? Paris: les éditions de l'Aube, 2003.
- Time, Labor and Social Domination: A Reinterpretation of Marx's Critical Theory. New York and Cambridge: Cambridge University Press, 1993.
- Bourdieu: Critical Perspectives. co-editor with Craig Calhoun and Edward LiPuma, Chicago and Cambridge: University of Chicago Press and Polity Press, 1993.

Articles and chapters

- "The Current Crisis and the Anachronism of Value: A Marxian Reading." Continental Thought & Theory: A Journal of Intellectual Freedom 1, no. 4 (2017): 38-54.
- "History and Helplessness: Mass Mobilization and Contemporary Forms of Anticapitalism" Public Culture 18.1 Duke UP 2006.
- "Critique, State, and Economy" in Fred Rush (ed.) The Cambridge Companion to Critical Theory, Cambridge: Cambridge University Press, 2004.
- "The Holocaust and the Trajectory of the Twentieth Century," in M. Postone and E. Santner (eds.) Catastrophe and Meaning. University of Chicago Press, 2003.
- "Lukács and the Dialectical Critique of Capitalism," in R. Albritton and J. Simoulidis, (eds.), New Dialectics and Political Economy, Houndsmill, Basingstoke and New York: Palgrave Macmillan, 2003.
- "Hannah Arendts Eichmann in Jerusalem: Die unaufgelöste Antinomie von Universalität und Besonderem," in Gary Smith (ed.), Hannah Arendt Revisited: "Eichmann in Jerusalem" und die Folgen, Suhrkamp Verlag, Frankfurt a.M., 2000.
- "Contemporary Historical Transformations: Beyond Postindustrial and Neo-Marxist Theories," Current Perspectives in Social Theory. Vol. 19, 1999. Stamford, Conn: JAI Press Inc., 1999.
- "Deconstruction as Social Critique: Derrida on Marx and the New World Order," [review essay on Jacques Derrida, Specters of Marx] in History and Theory, October, 1998.
- "Rethinking Marx in a Postmarxist World," in Charles Camic (ed.), Reclaiming the Sociological Classics. Cambridge, Mass.: Blackwell Publishers, 1998.
- "Political Theory and Historical Analysis," in C. Calhoun (ed.), Habermas and the Public Sphere, Cambridge, Mass.: MIT Press, 1992.
- "History and Critical Social Theory," (Review essay on Jürgen Habermas, The Theory of Communicative Action) in Contemporary Sociology. Vol. 19, No. 2, March, 1990.
- "After the Holocaust: History and Identity in West Germany," in K. Harms, L.R. Reuter and V. Dürr (eds.), Coping with the Past: Germany and Austria after 1945, Madison: University of Wisconsin Press, 1990.
- "Anti-Semitism and National Socialism," in A. Rabinbach and J. Zipes (eds.), Germans and Jews Since the Holocaust, New York: Holmes and Meier, 1986. (Available in Farsi here)
- "On Nicolaus' 'Introduction' to the Grundrisse". Telos 22 (Winter 1974-5). New York: Telos Press.
