= Gudo Visconti =

- Comune
- Comune di Gudo Visconti
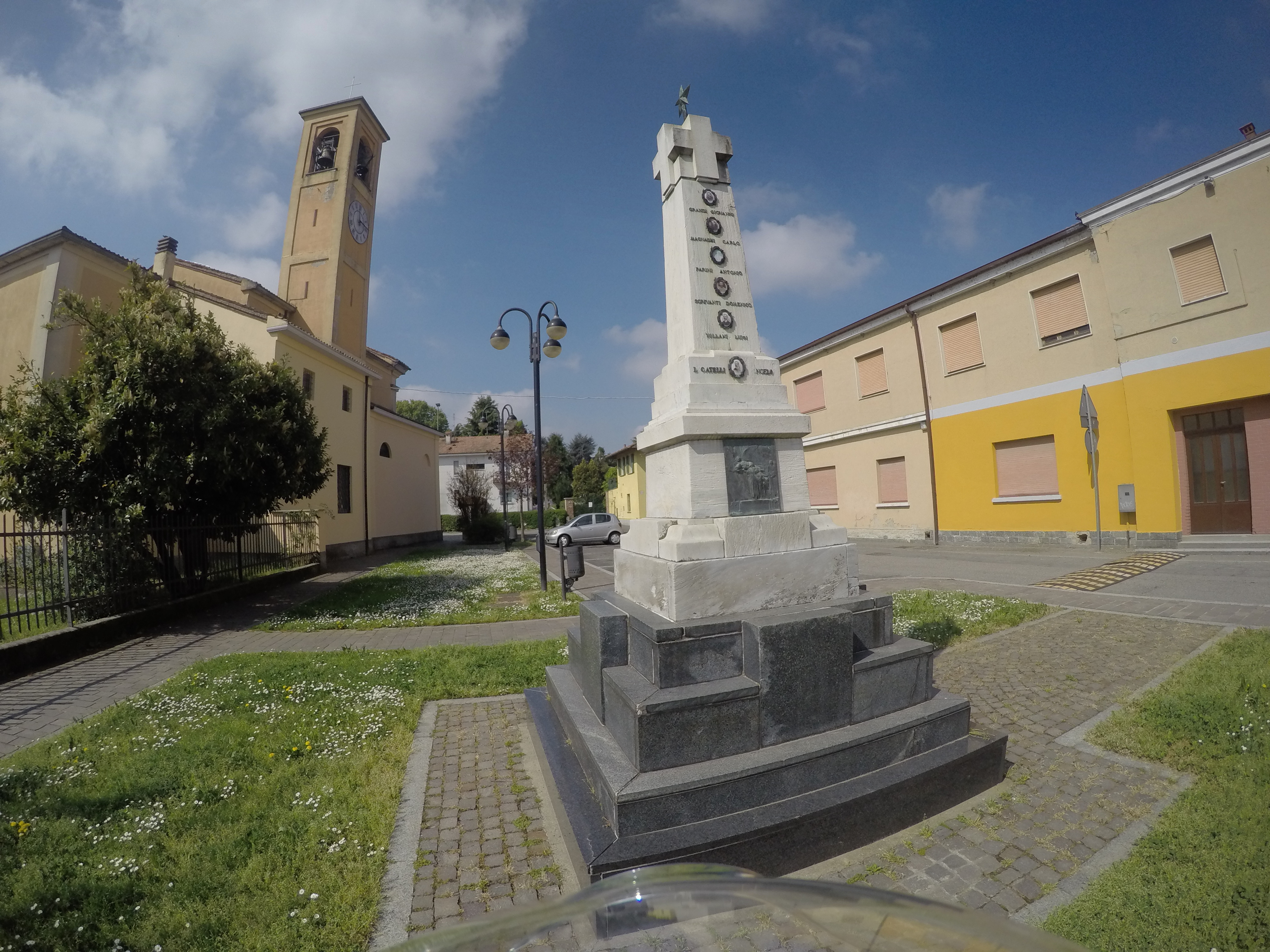
- Gudo Visconti - Piazza Vittorio Veneto (2015)

- Coat of arms

- Location within Italy Location within Lombardy
- Coordinates: 45°23′N 9°0′E
- Country: Italy
- Region: Lombardy
- Metropolitan city: Milan (MI)

Government
  - Mayor: Nunzio Omar Cirulli

Area
  - Total: 6.0 km^{2} (2.3 sq mi)
- Elevation: 116 m (381 ft)

Population (31 August 2017)
  - Total: 1,643
  - Density: 270/km^{2} (710/sq mi)
- Demonym: Gudesi
- Time zone: UTC+1 (CET)
  - Summer (DST): UTC+2 (CEST)
- Postal code: 20088
- Dialing code: 02
- Website: Official website

Gudo Visconti (Milanese: Gùd) is a comune (municipality) in the Metropolitan City of Milan in the Italian region Lombardy, located about 15 kilometres (9 mi) southwest of Milan.
