= 1993 Italian referendum =

An eight-part abrogative referendum was held in Italy on 18 April 1993. Voters were asked whether they approved of the repealing of laws on limiting intervention of local health units in dealing with environmental pollution, limiting the use of medicinal drugs, political party finances, the use of proportional representation in the Senate of Italy and the regulation of public banks, as well as the abolition of the Ministry of Agricultural, Food and Forestry Policies, the Ministry of State Holdings, and the Ministry of Tourism. All eight proposals were approved with support ranging from 55.3% to 90.3%.

== Results ==
=== Repealing of the law limiting the intervention of local health units in environmental problems ===
Choice	Votes	%
✓ Yes	28,567,412	82.5
No	6,072,792	17.5
Invalid/blank votes	2,171,797	–
Total	36,843,596	100
Registered voters/turnout	47,890,205	76.9
Source: Nohlen & Stöver

=== Repealing of the law limiting the use of medicinal drugs ===
Results of the referendum by province. Blue indicates a major in favour; red indicates a majority against.

Choice	Votes	%
✓ Yes	19,225,638	55.3
No	15,530,748	44.7
Invalid/blank votes	2,103,387	–
Total	36,893,668	100
Registered voters/turnout	47,890,203	77.0
Source: Nohlen & Stöver

=== Repealing of the political party financing law ===
Choice	Votes	%
✓ Yes	31,492,808	90.3
No	3,378,905	9.7
Invalid/blank votes	1,982,938	–
Total	36,880,311	100
Registered voters/turnout	47,890,203	77.0
Source: Nohlen & Stöver

=== Repealing of the law regulating the administration of public banks ===
Choice	Votes	%
✓ Yes	31,058,460	89.8
No	3,515,206	10.2
Invalid/blank votes	2,251,490	–
Total	36,853,653	100
Registered voters/turnout	47,890,203	77.0
Source: Nohlen & Stöver

=== Replacing proportional representation with winner-takes-all for the Senate elections ===
Results of the referendum by province. Blue indicates a major in favour; red indicates a majority against.

Choice	Votes	%
✓ Yes	28,937,375	82.7
No	6,038,909	17.3
Invalid/blank votes	1,903,385	–
Total	36,914,626	100
Registered voters/turnout	47,890,086	77.1
Source: Nohlen & Stöver

=== Abolition of the Ministry of Agriculture ===
Choice	Votes	%
✓ Yes	24,334,875	70.1
No	10,367,498	29.9
Invalid/blank votes	2,117,674	–
Total	36,855,452	100
Registered voters/turnout	47,890,086	77.0
Source: Nohlen & Stöver

=== Abolition of the Ministry of State Holdings ===
Choice	Votes	%
✓ Yes	31,242,854	90.1
No	3,424,912	9.9
Invalid/blank votes	2,142,351	–
Total	36,845,828	100
Registered voters/turnout	47,890,086	76.9
Source: Nohlen & Stöver

=== Abolition of the Ministry of Tourism ===
Choice	Votes	%
✓ Yes	28,512,1658	82.2
No	6,187,846	17.8
Invalid/blank votes	2,111,767	–
Total	36,838,788	100
Registered voters/turnout	47,890,086	76.9
Source: Nohlen & Stöver
