= Hans-Joachim Gelberg =

German writer and publisher (1930–2020)

- Born: 27 August 1930; Dortmund
- Died: 17 May 2020 (aged 89); Weinheim, Baden Württemberg, Germany
- Occupations: Author of children's literature; Publisher of children's literature; Editor
- Organizations: Beltz & Gelberg
- Awards: Deutscher Jugendliteraturpreis; Bologna Ragazzi Award

Hans-Joachim Gelberg (27 August 1930 – 17 May 2020) was a German writer and publisher of children's books, who received several awards.

== Biography ==
Gelberg was born in Dortmund and later lived in Weinheim, Baden Württemberg.

Gelberg founded in 1971 the children’s book series Beltz & Gelberg as part of the publisher Verlagsgruppe Beltz. The initial eight books grew to 1000 titles in 25 years. He published a magazine for youth literature, Der bunte Hund, around three times per year. He began a yearbook for children's literature in 1971, which appeared until 1999. Since 1982, Gelberg collaborated with Achim Bröger, Janosch and Peter Härtling for individual issues of the magazine. Gelbert published work by writers for children including Josef Guggenmos, Nikolaus Heidelbach, Hans Manz, Erwin Moser, Christine Nöstlinger, Rafik Schami and Jürgen Spohn. He lectured at the University of Frankfurt. In 2011, he published an anthology of poetry for children, entitled Wo kommen die Worte her? (Where do the words come from?). It contains poems by more than 100 authors expressly written for the book, and also older poems by Christian Morgenstern and Joachim Ringelnatz, among others.

Gelberg died on 17 May 2020 in a hospice in Weinheim, aged 89.

== Awards ==
- 1972: Deutscher Jugendliteraturpreis for Geh und spiel mit dem Riesen
- 2001: Bologna Ragazzi Award for Großer Ozean: Gedichte für alle
- 2004: Friedrich-Bödecker-Preis
- 2014: The primary school in Lützelsachsen, a district of Weinheim, was named after him.

== Books ==
- Geh und spiel mit dem Riesen. Beltz & Gelberg, Weinheim 1971, ISBN 3-407-80200-5.
- Update on Rumpelstiltskin and other Fairy Tales by 43 Authors. Illustrations by Willi Glasauer, Beltz & Gelberg, Weinheim 1976, ISBN 3-407-80518-7.
- Der bunte Hund. Beltz & Gelberg, Weinheim 1982, ISBN 3-407-80401-6.
- Kinderland – Zauberland. Maier, Ravensburg 1986, ISBN 3-473-51531-0.
- Aller Dings. Werkstattbuch zum Programm B & G. Beltz & Gelberg, Weinheim 1996, ISBN 3-407-79699-4.
- Grosser Ozean: Gedichte für alle. Beltz & Gelberg, Weinheim 2006, ISBN 3-407-74018-2.
- Eines Tages: Geschichten von überallher. Beltz & Gelberg, Weinheim 2008, ISBN 978-3-407-74088-5
- Märchen aus Aller Welt. Illustrations of Nikolaus Heidelbach, Beltz & Gelberg, Weinheim 2010 ISBN 978-3-407-79973-9
