= Zelo Surrigone =

- Comune
- Comune di Zelo Surrigone
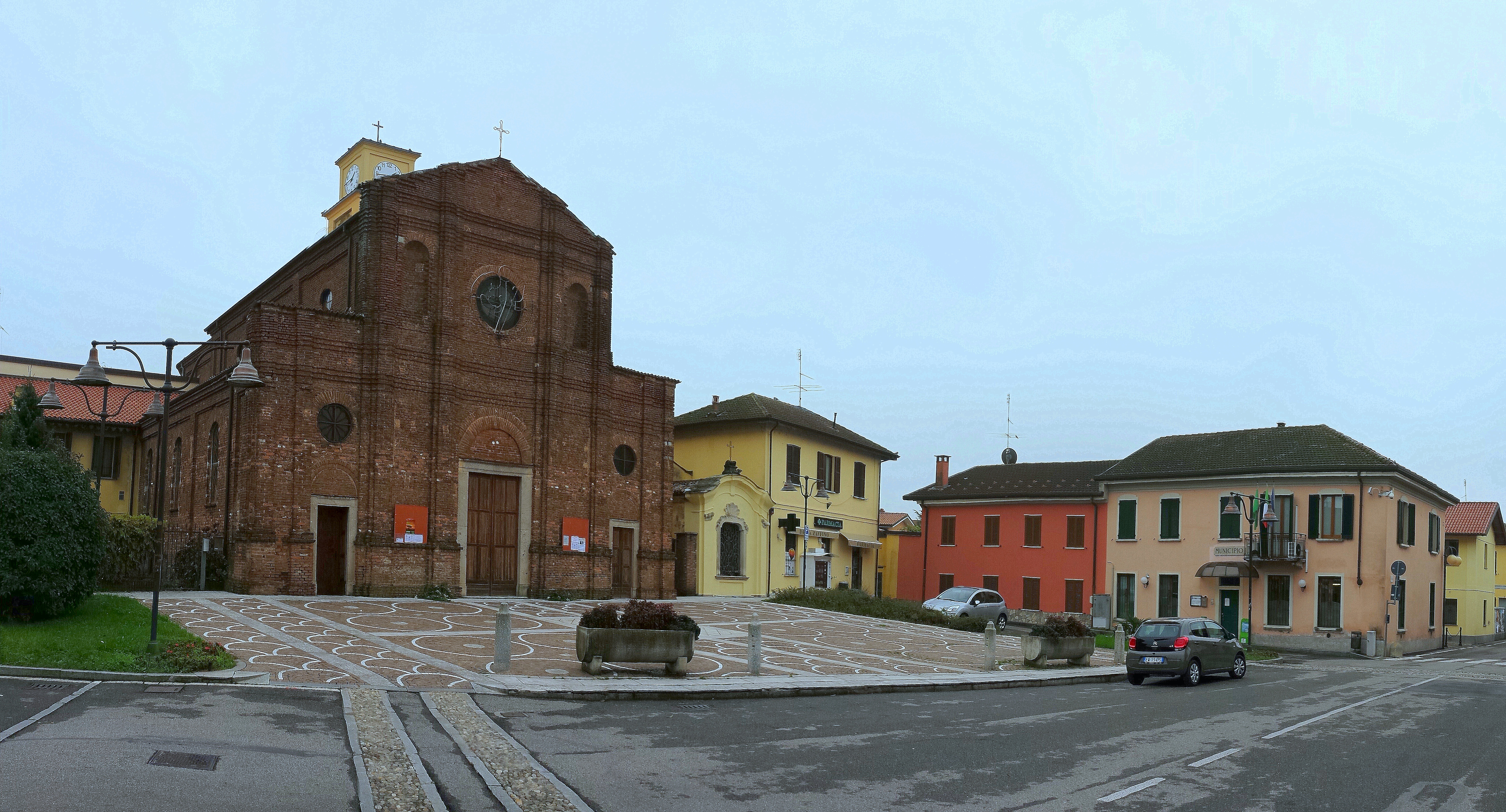

- Coat of arms

- Location within Italy Location within Lombardy
- Coordinates: 45°23′N 8°59′E
- Country: Italy
- Region: Lombardy
- Metropolitan city: Milan (MI)

Government
  - Mayor: Gabriella Raimondo

Area
  - Total: 4.4 km^{2} (1.7 sq mi)
- Elevation: 113 m (371 ft)

Population (31 December 2017)
  - Total: 1,849
  - Density: 420/km^{2} (1,100/sq mi)
- Demonym: Zelesi
- Time zone: UTC+1 (CET)
  - Summer (DST): UTC+2 (CEST)
- Postal code: 20080
- Dialing code: 02
- Website: Official website

Zelo Surrigone (Milanese: Zel) is a comune (municipality) in the Metropolitan City of Milan in the Italian region Lombardy, located about 15 kilometres (9 mi) southwest of Milan.

The church of Santa Giuliana (1418) has frescoes from the 15th and 16th centuries.
