= Claus Peter Ortlieb =

German mathematician

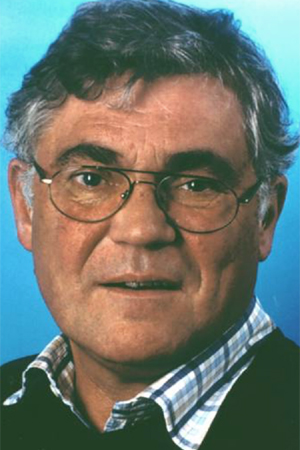
Claus Peter Ortlieb.

Claus Peter Ortlieb (1 May 1947 – 15 September 2019) was a German mathematician, critic of work, critic of political economy, and a critic of contemporary science, especially regarding its use of mathematics. He was an editor for the journal EXIT!.

== Biography ==
Ortlieb was born in Reinbek. He studied the University of Hamburg where he earned his doctorate 1976 under the supervision of Lothar Collatz. The name of his dissertation was Dualität und Näherungsverfahren bei konvexen Steuerungsproblemen (English: "Duality and approximation methods in convex control problems"). Ortlieb taught at the University of Hamburg as a professor at the faculty of mathematics from 1985 to 2011. Ortlieb was one of the most known names of the writers in the magazine Krisis among Robert Kurz, Roswitha Scholz, Ernst Lohoff and Norbert Trenkle. Other than his mathematical work, Ortlieb was critical against contemporary science and its problem with mathematical models, particularly within biology and economics. Ortlieb also wrote polemic articles in the paper Konkret. Ortlieb died on 15 September 2019 in Hamburg at the age of 72.

== Publications ==
- Zur Kritik des modernen Fetischismus. Gesammelte Texte von Claus Peter Ortlieb 1997–2015. Schmetterling Verlag, Reihe: Black books, Stuttgart 2019, ISBN 3-89657-174-5.
- Zusammen mit Caroline v. Dresky, Ingenuin Gasser und Silke Günzel: Mathematische Modellierung. Eine Einführung in zwölf Fallstudien. 2. Aufl., Springer Spektrum, Wiesbaden 2013, ISBN 3-658-00534-3.
- Robert Kurz, Weltkrise und Ignoranz: Kapitalismus im Niedergang.. Edited together with Roswitha Scholz . edition TIAMAT, 5th of mars 2013. ISBN 3-89320-173-4
- Arbeitszwang und Arbeitsethos – 2012
- Heinrich Hertz und das Konzept des Mathematischen Modells. In: Gudrun Wolfschmidt (Hrsg.) (2008): Heinrich Hertz (1857–1894) and the Development of Communication – Proceedings of the International Scientific Symposium in Hamburg. Oct., 8–12, 2007. Books on Demand, Norderstedt.
- „Wesen der Wirklichkeit“ oder „Mathematikwahn“? In: Mathematik und Gesellschaft: Historische, philosophische und didaktische Perspektiven. Taschenbuch, herausgegeben von Gregor Nickel et al., Springer Spektrum; 1. Aufl. 2018 (14. Mai 2018), ISBN 3-658-16122-1.
- Die verlorene Unschuld der Produktivität. In: Jahrbuch Denknetz 2010. Zu gut für den Kapitalismus. Blockierte Potenziale in einer überforderten Wirtschaft. 12–19, Edition 8, Zürich 2010, ISBN 978-3-85990-162-9.
- Die Zahlen als Medium und Fetisch. In: Jens Schröter, Gregor Schwering, Urs Stäheli (Hrsg.): Media Marx: Ein Handbuch. Transcript Verlag, Bielefeld 2006, Serie Masse und Medium, 4.
- A Contradiction between Matter and Form: On the Significance of the Production of Relative Surplus Value in the Dynamic of Terminal Crisis. In: Neil Larsen, Mathias Nilges, Josh Robinson, Nicholas Brown (Hrsg.): Marxism and the Critique of Value. 77–122, MCM Publishing, Chicago 2014.
- Der prozessierende Widerspruch. Produktion des relativen Mehrwerts und Krisendynamik. In: Gerd Grözinger, Utz-Peter Reich (Hrsg.): Ökonomie und Gesellschaft. Jahrbuch 24, Entfremdung – Ausbeutung – Revolte, Karl Marx neu verhandelt. Metropolis-Verlag, Marburg 2012, ISBN 978-3-89518-941-8.
