= Krisis =

Krisis may refer to:

- Krisis (journal), a Dutch/English academic philosophy journal
- Krisis (magazine), a German political magazine and discussion group
- Krisis, a 1554 philosophical work by Justus Velsius
- Krisis (film), a 1953 Indonesian film produced by Perfini
