= Anselm Jappe =

German professor of philosophy (born 1962)

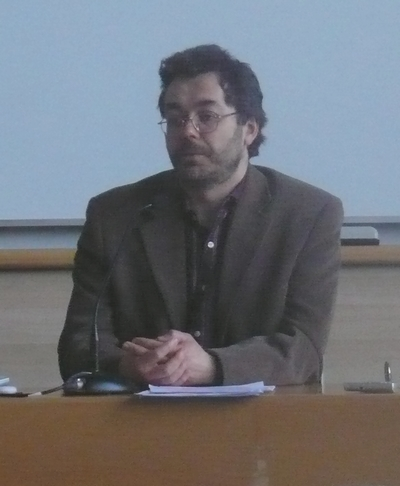
Anselm Jappe, 2010.

Anselm Jappe (born 3 May 1962, Bonn) is a German professor of philosophy. Jappe currently resides in Italy. Jappe has authored several works in German, French, and Italian. Jappe has lectured at several institutions in within higher education.

== Biography ==
Anselm Jappe was born born on 3 May 1962 in Bonn. He spent his childhood in Cologne and in the Périgord. He studied in Paris and Rome where he obtained a master's and then a doctorate degree in philosophy, respectively. His advisor was Mario Perniola. A member of the Krisis Group, he has published numerous articles in different journals and reviews, including Iride (Florence), Il Manifesto (Rome), L'Indice (Milan), and Mania (Barcelona). He has authored several works on critical theory and is well known for his writings on the situationist international.

He is currently teaching aesthetics at the Accademia di Belle Arti di Roma. Since 2002/2003, he was teaching at the Accademia di Belle Arti di Frosinone

== Notable works ==
=== Guy Debord ===
Guy Debord (1993) is an intellectual biography of Guy Debord and one of Jappe's most famous books. It was translated to english by Donald Nicholson-Smith who is closely tied to Debord and the Situationist International. Guy Debord (1993) is generally considered the first intellectual biography of Guy Debord, In the book, Jappe critiques and defends Debord's various ideas. Jappe makes an effort to distance Debord's ideas from postmodernist philosophers like Jean Baudrillard in order to prevent Debord's ideas from the situationist idea of recuperation.

=== The Self-Devouring Society ===
The Self-Devouring Society (2023) is a work of critical theory that argues capitalism has turned everyone into a narcissist. Jappe also argues that through constant reoccurring crises, capitalism is on track to destroy itself.

=== Writings on the wall ===
writings on the wall (2017) is a collection of essays written by Anselm Jappe between 2007 and 2010. In it, Anselm argues that capitalism has a tendency towards creating crises, through the perpetual reoccurrence of said crises, capitalism is on track towards its own destruction. The book's analysis is centered around the critique of value (Wertkritik) school of marxism and examines human emancipation along with the decomposition of capitalism.

== Books ==
- 1992: Debord, Pescara: Tracce - about Guy Debord
- 1999: English translation by Donald Nicholson-Smith, Berkeley: University of California Press, 1999
- 2004: An Imbecile's Guide to Guy Debord's concept of the Spectacle, first published as "Part 1: The Concept of the Spectacle" in Guy Debord
- 2003: Les Habits neufs de l'empire : remarques sur Negri, Hardt et Rufin (with Robert Kurz) (Editions Lignes)
- 2004: L'avant-garde inacceptable - réflexions sur Guy Debord (Editions lignes-Léo Sheer)
- 2005: Adventures of the commodity: for a new criticism of value (Munich)
- 2017: The Writing on the Wall: On the Decomposition of Capitalism and Its Critics, - a collection of revised essays
- 2020: Béton – Arme de construction massive du capitalisme [Concrete. Capitalism’s Weapon of Mass Construction] (L’Échappée, 2020)

== See also ==
- EXIT!
- Robert Kurz
- Roswitha Scholz
- Krisis Group
