= Wertkritik =

German school of Marxist theory

Wertkritik (German: [ˈveːɐ̯tkʁiˌtiːk]; lit. 'value critique') is a school of Marxian critical theory that emerged in Germany in the 1980s. It sees itself as a continuation of Karl Marx's "esoteric" critique of the value-form, which it argues has been largely abandoned or misunderstood by "traditional" or "workers'-movement Marxism". The school's central figures include Robert Kurz, Roswitha Scholz, Norbert Trenkle, and Ernst Lohoff. Its main theoretical organs have been the journals Krisis and, following a 2004 split, Exit!.

The core of Wertkritik is a fundamental critique of the basic categories of capitalist society—value, commodity, money, and abstract labour—which it understands not as neutral economic concepts but as historically specific forms of social mediation that constitute a "real abstraction" governing social life. Unlike traditional Marxist analyses that focus on class struggle over the distribution of surplus value, Wertkritik identifies the value form itself as the object of critique. It argues that labour in capitalism is not a transhistorical source of wealth but a historically specific, "oppressive, inhumane, and antisocial activity" whose sole purpose is the endless accumulation of abstract wealth (value).

Wertkritik is primarily a theory of crisis, positing that capitalism possesses an absolute internal limit. It argues that the system's relentless drive to increase productivity through technology progressively expels living labour—the sole source of value—from production. This creates a fundamental contradiction: while material wealth increases, the production of value diminishes, ultimately leading to a "terminal crisis" of the capitalist mode of production. A major development within the school is Roswitha Scholz's theory of "value-dissociation" (Wertabspaltung), which posits that the value form necessarily dissociates and devalues activities, affects, and qualities coded as feminine, making this gendered dissociation a precondition of capitalist society. Wertkritik has had a significant reception in Brazil but remains largely unknown in the Anglophone world.

== History ==
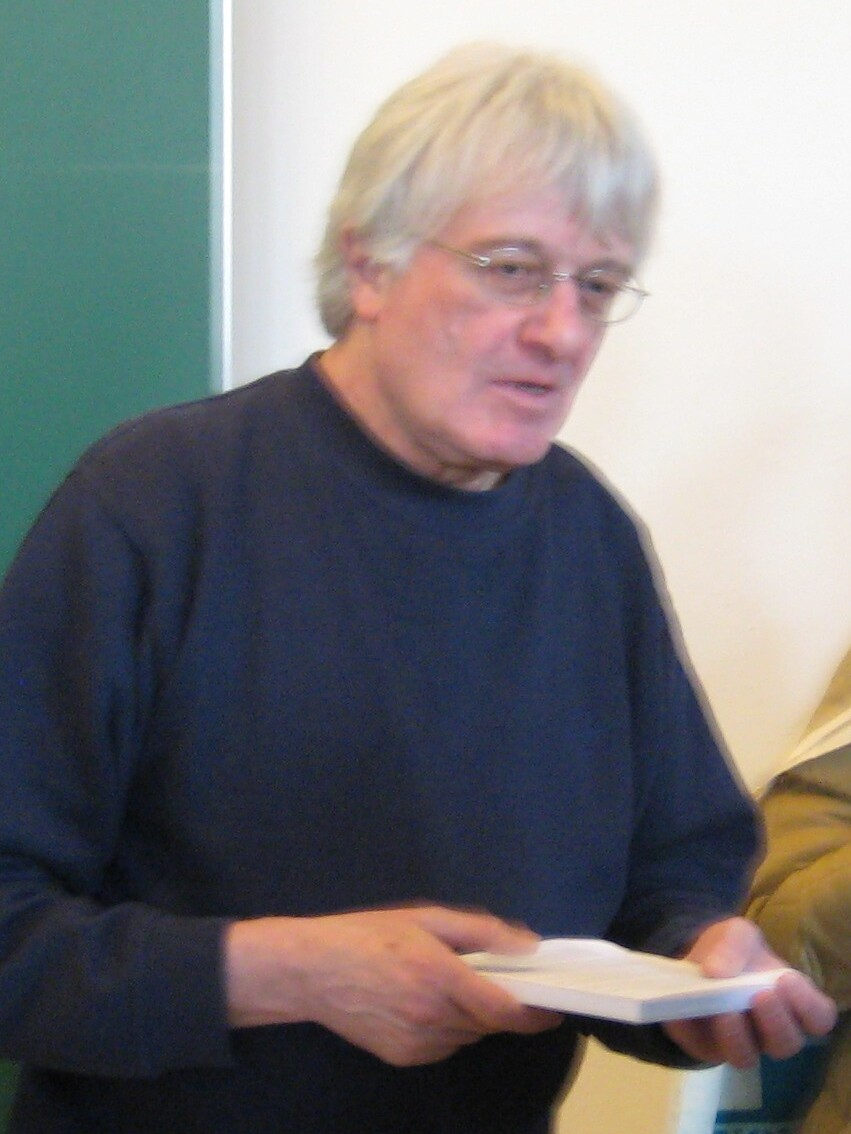
Robert Kurz

Wertkritik emerged from the West German radical left of the 1970s and 1980s. In 1986, a group based primarily in Nuremberg, whose members came from diverse revolutionary Marxist backgrounds including ex-members of the K-Gruppen and the autonomist scene, founded the journal Marxistische Kritik (Marxist Critique). The first issue contained Robert Kurz's essay "The Crisis of Exchange Value" (Die Krise des Tauschwerts), which has been described as "the founding document of value-critique". This essay laid out the core argument that capitalism's drive to increase productivity through technology leads to the expulsion of value-creating labour, thus creating an insurmountable internal contradiction.

Following the fall of the Berlin Wall, the journal was renamed Krisis in 1990. The group engaged with and distanced itself from other currents of Marxist thought, including Western Marxism (particularly the Frankfurt School and György Lukács), the German Neue Marx-Lektüre, and the "anti-German" communist tendency that arose from similar political milieus. While sometimes grouped with the Neue Marx-Lektüre, Wertkritik is distinguished by its origins in a more extra-academic radical milieu, a more vocal opposition to traditional Marxist politics, and a greater focus on the forms of subjectivity that capitalism engenders. Throughout the 1990s, the school developed its core concepts, with Kurz emerging as its most prominent and prolific theorist, notably with the 1999 publication of his magnum opus, Schwarzbuch Kapitalismus (The Black Book of Capitalism).

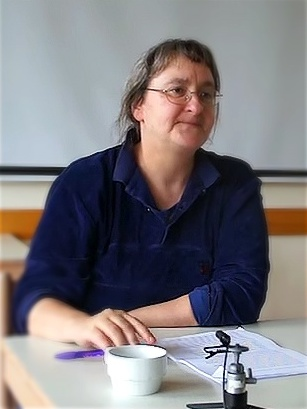
Roswitha Scholz

In 2004, the Krisis group experienced a "conflict-ridden and at times highly polemical public split". As a result, Kurz, Roswitha Scholz, and other members left to form the new journal Exit!. The remaining Krisis group continued under the editorship of Norbert Trenkle and Ernst Lohoff. The Exit! group has since tended to describe its approach as Wertabspaltungskritik (critique of value-dissociation) to highlight the centrality of Scholz's theory to its framework. Another associated publication, the Vienna-based Streifzüge, is loosely allied with the Krisis group.

== Core tenets ==
=== Critique of traditional Marxism and labour ===
Wertkritik defines itself in opposition to what it calls "traditional Marxism" or "workers'-movement Marxism". It argues that most Marxist traditions have failed to grasp the radicality of Karl Marx's "esoteric" critique of the value-form, settling instead for an "exoteric" critique focused on class struggle over the distribution of wealth. This traditional view, according to Wertkritik, remains trapped within the categories of capitalist society by affirming labour as a transhistorical, positive point of departure for critique. From this perspective, exploitation is seen as an injustice where surplus value is unfairly appropriated by capitalists, and the socialist project becomes one of liberating labour and ensuring a just distribution of its products.

In stark contrast, Wertkritik insists that labour itself is a category to be critiqued. Drawing on Marx's early writings, it views labour in capitalism not as a universal condition of human existence but as a historically specific "oppressive, inhumane, and antisocial activity that both is determined by and produces private property". It argues that "labour" as a separate sphere of life, governed by abstract time and aimed solely at the valorization of value, is the fundamental problem, not the standpoint of its solution. The goal is therefore not the liberation of labour, but liberation from labour.

=== Value as a real abstraction and fetishism ===
A central concept for Wertkritik is that of "real abstraction" (Realabstraktion), a term borrowed from Alfred Sohn-Rethel. The school critiques the naturalization of capitalist categories such as value, commodity, and money, which appear "reified and fetishized, as seemingly 'natural' facts of life and as 'objective necessities'". Value is understood not merely as a mental concept but as an "actually existing abstraction" that structures social relations prior to conscious thought. This abstract social form—value as coagulated abstract labour time—dominates the concrete, material side of life (use-value) and imposes its own quasi-objective logic on society.

While influenced by Sohn-Rethel's analysis, Wertkritik diverges from his view that the real abstraction occurs solely in the act of exchange. Theorists like Norbert Trenkle argue that production in capitalism is from the outset oriented toward valorization and exchange. Therefore, the real abstraction of value is not confined to the sphere of circulation but is already presupposed in and structures the sphere of production itself. Production for the sake of exchange-value always mediates commodity production; "every process of production is from the outset oriented toward the valorization of capital and organized accordingly". This re-centering of the real abstraction in the totality of social reproduction, rather than just in the market, is a key element of the school's framework.

For Wertkritik, this means abstract labour attains a substantial reality within production, prior to exchange. Robert Kurz, for example, defines abstract labour in physicalist terms as the "expenditure of human brains, nerves, muscles" or more simply as the expenditure of energy. This theoretical position has been a point of contention. Critics, particularly from the Neue Marx-Lektüre, argue that the Wertkritik approach constitutes a pre-monetary or "substantialist" theory of value. The Neue Marx-Lektüre generally advances a monetary theory of value, in which value is constituted only in the act of exchange. Wertkritik, by contrast, is seen as holding a "quasi-substantialist approach" where value is embodied in commodities during production, prior to exchange.

=== Terminal crisis ===
Wertkritik is, in its essence, a theory of crisis. It posits that capitalism is defined by an inescapable internal contradiction that drives it toward an "absolute, immanent limit". This contradiction stems from the dual character of the commodity as both a material good (a use-value) and a carrier of value (an exchange-value). While capitalism aims to endlessly increase value, its primary means of doing so—increasing productivity through technological innovation—systematically undermines the basis of value itself.

Value is constituted by the expenditure of human labour time. Competition forces individual capitalists to adopt new technologies to increase productivity, allowing them to produce more goods in less time. While this creates more material wealth, it reduces the amount of socially necessary labour time embodied in each individual commodity, thereby reducing its value. For a time, this effect was compensated for by the expansion of capitalism into new markets and new sectors, absorbing more labour into the production process than was expelled through rationalization. However, Wertkritik theorists argue that with the advent of the "third industrial revolution" (microelectronics), this dynamic reached a historical turning point in the 1970s. From this point on, the rate of labour expulsion has permanently outstripped the rate of labour absorption, leading to a "progressive fall in the total mass of value produced by society". In developing this theory, Wertkritik draws on Marx's Grundrisse, particularly the "Fragment on Machines", to argue that the law of value becomes "increasingly obsolete" as direct labour time ceases to be the primary source of wealth. Capitalism can continue only by creating "fictitious capital" through credit and financial speculation, leading to bubbles that defer but ultimately exacerbate the underlying crisis of valorization. The result is a "terminal crisis" in which the system collapses as its own foundation—value—dissolves.

=== Value-dissociation ===
Roswitha Scholz's theory of "value-dissociation" (Wertabspaltung) is a major development within Wertkritik, particularly emphasized by the Exit! group. Scholz argues that the critique of value is incomplete without an analysis of its relationship to patriarchy. According to her theory, the value form is not a totalizing logic but one that is inherently broken and self-contradictory. For abstract labour and the sphere of value production to constitute themselves, they must necessarily "dissociate" or split off a whole range of activities, qualities, and affects that cannot be subsumed under the logic of value.

These dissociated elements—including reproductive and domestic work, care, emotionality, and sensuality—do not simply exist outside of capitalism but are a necessary precondition for it, forming its non-identical "other". This sphere of dissociation is historically and symbolically coded as "feminine". Modernity is thus characterized by a "commodity-producing patriarchy" in which the universal, abstract sphere of value is implicitly masculine, while the particular, sensual sphere of the dissociated is feminine. This dissociation is not a pre-capitalist residue but a core structural principle of capitalism itself. The theory of value-dissociation therefore provides a framework for understanding the persistence of gender hierarchy in modernity, not as a cultural or biological phenomenon, but as integral to the social form of value.

=== Critique of the subject and class struggle ===
Flowing from its critique of labour, Wertkritik rejects the traditional Marxist conception of the proletariat as the revolutionary subject destined to overthrow capitalism. It sees class struggle, as historically practiced, as a conflict within the logic of capitalism, not against it. The workers' movement fought for recognition and a larger share of the value produced, thereby affirming its own role as the seller of the commodity of labour power and remaining immanent to the value form. According to Anselm Jappe, for example, the existence of a "powerful proletariat" in the past was merely a "precapitalist relic", and contemporary struggles are now "merely struggles over distribution within a system that nobody now seriously challenges".

For Wertkritik, the subject capable of overcoming capitalism "cannot arise from the affirmation of the category of the worker, but only from the crisis, the crisis of value". As the terminal crisis progresses and increasing numbers of people are rendered superfluous to the valorization process, their identity as "workers" is eroded in a process Norbert Trenkle terms "declassing". This does not automatically create a new revolutionary subject, but it does open up the possibility of a critique that targets the fundamental categories of labour and value themselves, rather than merely negotiating the terms of their existence. The goal becomes not the victory of one class over another, but an "emancipatory struggle without classes" aimed at the abolition of the value form altogether.

Critics such as John Holloway argue that this objectivist theory of crisis reproduces the traditional Marxist separation between economic structure and class struggle. From this perspective, Wertkritik presents the breakdown of capitalism as a purely mechanical, automatic process, leaving little room for subjective agency or social struggle. The crisis appears as a "strictly mechanical" contradiction within the value form, rather than a process constituted by and mediated through the antagonisms of social practice.

== Reception and influence ==
Despite its systematic development over several decades, Wertkritik has remained largely confined to the German-speaking world and has had limited impact on international Marxist discourse. In the Anglophone world, in particular, it has been described as "virtually absent" and as a "terra incognita" due to a near-total lack of English translations until the 2010s. Both Wertkritik and Moishe Postone's contemporaneous reinterpretation of Marx in his Time, Labor and Social Domination (1993) are considered to have their roots in the German "form-analytical" ideas of the 1970s.

The most significant reception of Wertkritik outside of Germany has been in Brazil. This was sparked in the mid-1990s by the influential review by literary and social critic Roberto Schwarz of the Portuguese translation of Robert Kurz's Der Kollaps der Modernisierung (The Collapse of Modernization). The book's analysis resonated with Brazil's experience of failed developmentalism, leading to a sustained engagement with value-critical ideas, particularly at the University of São Paulo. This interest also led to Kurz becoming a regular columnist for Brazil's largest daily newspaper, Folha de S.Paulo.

Wertkritik has also had a complex relationship with the "anti-German" (antideutsch) current in the German radical left. Both tendencies emerged from similar political milieus and shared a critique of traditional anti-imperialism, antisemitism disguised as anti-Zionism, and vulgar Marxist criticisms of finance capital. However, Wertkritik later distanced itself from the anti-German movement, criticizing what it saw as its uncritical support for US and Israeli state policy.

== See also ==
- Marx's theory of alienation
- Open Marxism

== Notes ==
=== Works cited ===
- Bunyard, Tom (2018), Debord, Time and Spectacle: Hegelian Marxism and Situationist Theory, Leiden: Brill, ISBN 978-90-04-22526-8
- Larsen, Neil; Nilges, Mathias; Robinson, Josh; Brown, Nicholas (2014), Marxism and the Critique of Value, Chicago: MCM' Publishing, ISBN 9780989549707
- Tetler, Benjamin (2024), Marx's Not-Capital: Labour and the Contemporary Critique of Political Economy, Palgrave Macmillan, ISBN 978-3-031-58414-5
