= Schwarzbuch Kapitalismus =

Book by Robert Kurz

- Author: Robert Kurz
- Original title: Schwarzbuch Kapitalismus
- Language: German
- Publication date: 1999
- Publication place: Germany

The Black Book of Capitalism (Subtitle: A Farewell to Market Economy) (Original title: Schwarzbuch Kapitalismus – Ein Abgesang auf die Marktwirtschaft) is a book written by German philosopher and critical-theorist Robert Kurz and published in 1999. It critically examines the history and purported slow collapse of capitalism. It is considered one of the main work of the author associated with value criticism and sparked a debate about the description of the origins of capitalism, its contemporary diagnosis, and the consequences of criticizing the prevailing conditions. The book has, as of 2023, not yet been translated into other languages from the original German.

Kurz had originally preferred the title The Satanic Mills for his work, but was convinced by editor, that preferred a title in relation to The Black Book of Communism. However, Kurz's book does not attempt to list the crimes of capitalism, as Kurz explains that he doesn't "think that even 100 thick volumes would suffice". Instead, this work is a history of the three great industrial revolutions, the legitimization of the social consequences of capitalism, the socialist labour movement viewed as engrained in bourgeois modernization, and the crises that can be viewed as endemic under the capitalist system.

== Overview ==
=== Basic Ideas ===
The central focus of the Black Book is the "Social Question" of the present. Capitalism is currently heading towards a "hopeless situation," and the market economy is unable to cope with its leaps in productivity, such as automation and globalization. The standard of living for broad sections of the population is declining, unemployment is increasing, and the escape into the service sector proves to be an illusion. If the necessary "leap in consciousness" is not made, it ultimately threatens a "rationalization of humanity" and an increasing "decivilization of the world."

Kurz believes that capitalism has a "devastating" overall record in terms of welfare improvement. Although capitalism accelerates the development of productive forces, an increase in welfare has only been temporarily associated with it, limited to "certain social segments and world regions". Capitalism has never been able to apply the powers it has generated for the improvement of the lives of all people.

To be able to think of a new, different alternative, the "apparently ahistorical capitalism" that appears as a natural fact must be historicized. For this purpose, Kurz analyzes the history of capitalism from its beginnings in the 16th century to the present day. He assumes that it has been shaped by three major industrial revolutions: the replacement of human muscle power with machine power in the first industrial revolution, the rationalization of human labor in the second, and the automation that renders human labor redundant in the third industrial revolution.

Kurz puts forth the argument that the overarching force driving historical progress is the self-subjugation of humanity to the economic process of wealth accumulation. He employs Adam Smith's concept of the "beautiful machine" to illustrate this phenomenon. Kurz characterizes this mechanism as a "completely impersonal" and "blind mechanism" that is often accepted without critical examination, almost akin to a quasi "natural law." The primary objective of this "beautiful machine" is the continuous "valorization of value" , entailing the perpetual accumulation of "money" and "quantities of abstract labor". Utilizing Karl Marx's terminology, Kurz describes this mode of production as "meaningless" since it no longer depends on its inherent content but solely on the "expenditure of labor power as such. " It involves surrendering to the "abstract self-purpose of money" and engaging in a "determined activity beyond one's own needs and outside of one's own control." Holding onto the principle of "abstract labor" represents a fundamental commonality observed throughout societies and their critics since the advent of modern times. Even the proponents of bourgeois revolutions and the labor movement have been unable to liberate themselves from this paradigm.

=== Context ===
The work can be seen in the context of the "Manifesto Against Work" and other publications by authors of the capitalism-critical journals Exit! and Krisis. It is part of a collapse theory advocated by Kurz. Its starting point is his publication The Collapse of Modernization (1991), in which Robert Kurz examines "the collapse of state socialism and the end of traditional Marxist world interpretation." The "Black Book of Capitalism" is an analysis of the "capitalist history" as a sequence of three industrial revolutions, focusing on the development of "productive forces" and the "history of ideology." The sequel to the "Black Book" is a trilogy on the process of globalization: "World Order War" examines the "traditional imperialism debate," while "The World Capital" analyzes the globalization debate. It also includes an unpublished account of the role of the United States in the world economy since World War II.

== Theory and Content ==
=== Cultural-Historical Foundations ===
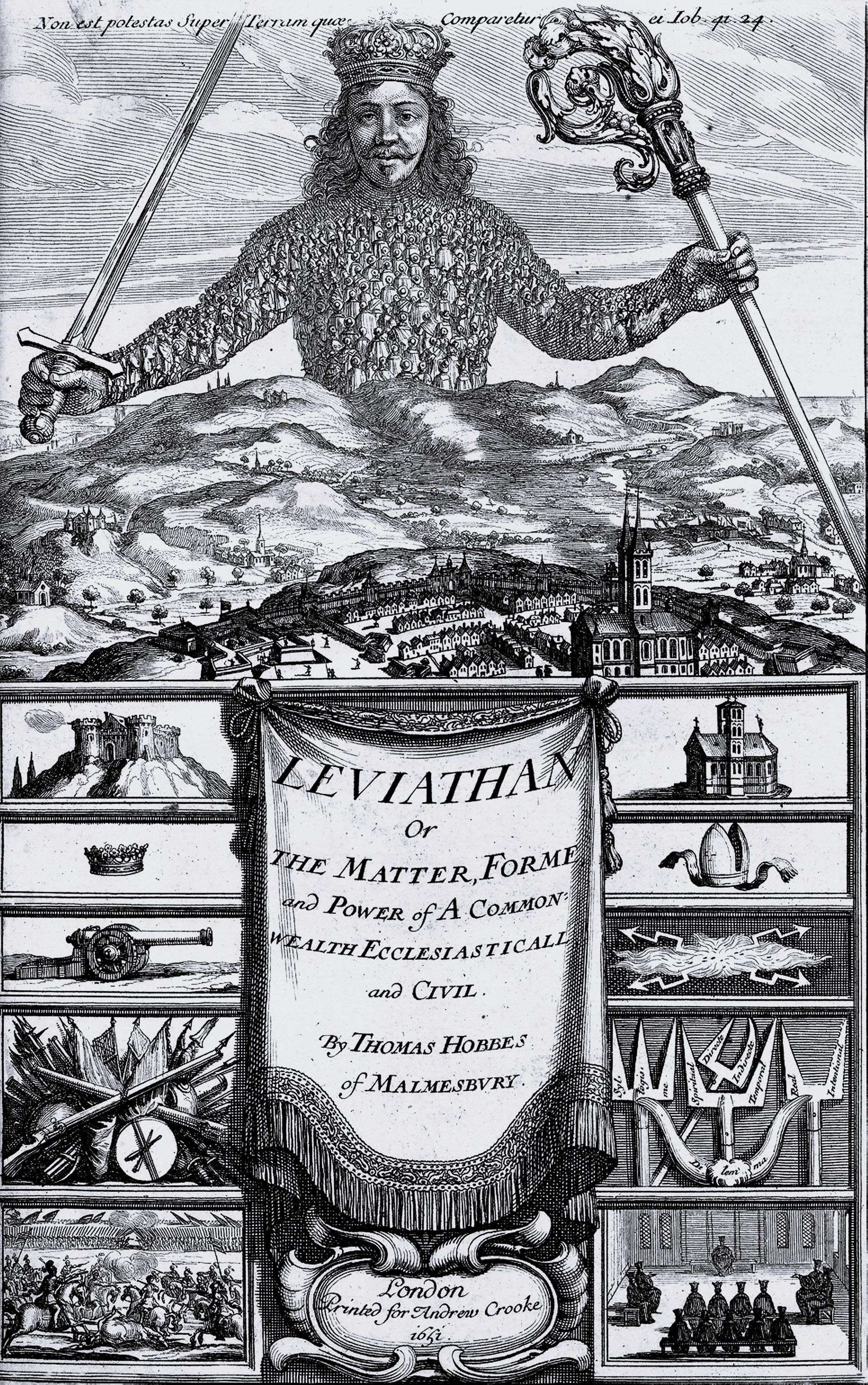
Cover of Hobbes' Leviathan (1651) – Hobbes viewed human society as a "society of monsters"

==== Intellectual Development ====
Kurz begins his historical analysis of capitalism in the early 17th century, when a societal model of "total competition" emerged. He believes that the underlying worldview and image of humanity became hegemonic in Western thinking up to the present day.

The rising entrepreneurial class in the market economy secured a strong social position. However, it no longer felt bound to the traditional structure of authoritarian hierarchy and developed its own "ideology of domination" to legitimize its specific interests. According to Kurz, the "great patriarch of liberalism" is Thomas Hobbes. Hobbes considered humans inherently egoistic beings engaged in a "war of all against all," and he argued for the necessity of a superior power, the state, to tame the "human predators" and establish negative sociability. Kurz asserts that this justification of the "absolute state" continues to exist today. For Hobbes, "freedom" primarily meant "buying and selling and engaging in trade" rather than the ability to "cooperatively behave according to one's own needs and agreements."

Kurz argues that the transformation of the competitive impulse into a positive attribute, which he refers to as the "revaluation of all values," was carried out by Bernard Mandeville. According to Mandeville, through mutual competition, the naturally lazy, selfish, and greedy human being can contribute to a "flourishing community." This perspective declares that "feeling and suffering with the misfortunes and misery of others" is a sentiment of the "weakest minds" that should not be indulged by the "men of the market."

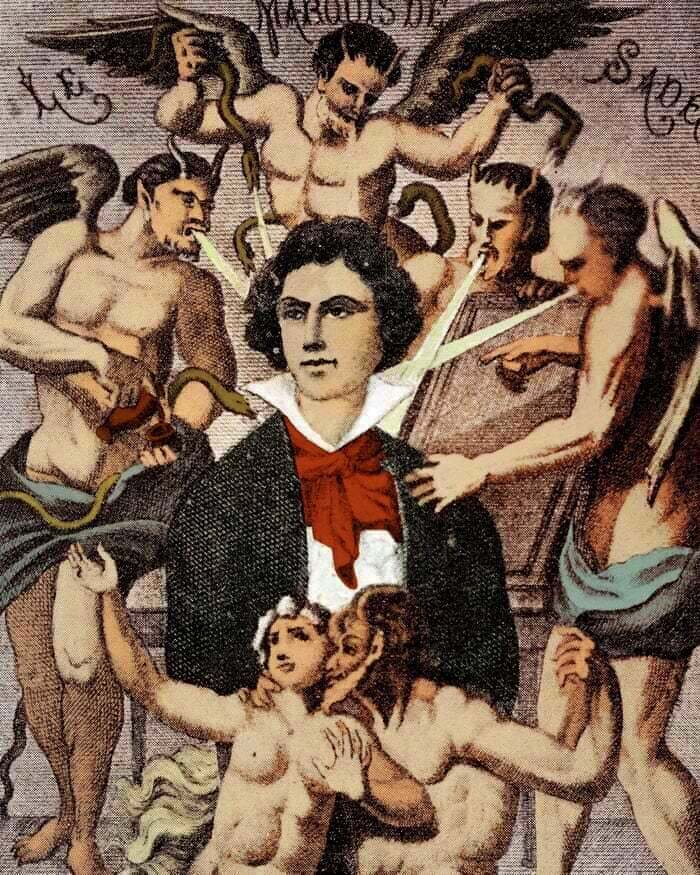
Depiction of the Marquis de Sade by H. Biberstein in L'Œuvre du marquis de Sade, Guillaume Apollinaire (Edit.), Bibliothèque des Curieux, Paris, 1912

According to Kurz, this cynicism is surpassed by Marquis de Sade, who radicalized the ideology of the "survival of the fittest" to the extent of murder. De Sade branded any social compassion as a negative "natural characteristic" of women. By reducing sexuality to the act of coitus, he transformed it into a mechanical process analogous to the capitalist production process.

According to Kurz, the views of Immanuel Kant represent a further advancement in that they assume the competition of selfish individuals as the developmental law of humanity. Kant considered the mechanism of global capital as "a work of the 'Hand of God,'" as "the result of an overall context determined by divine providence, a 'higher nature' of the system".

This idea of the "wise creator" then leads to the popularized metaphor of the "invisible hand" mentioned in Adam Smith's magnum opus. According to Kurz, this metaphor shows "how the worldview of modern economics systematically builds on that of mechanical physics." Smith insists that "through the obsessive activism of capitalist 'makers,' the greatest possible improvement and the best possible distribution" are achieved, rendering any criticism unnecessary. The glorification of the "independent and self-contained 'beauty of order'" and the brilliance of the economic "machine," the regular and harmonious movement of the system, is emphasized. Smith is seen as having developed the worldview [Weltanschauung] of modern economics, ultimately based on that of mechanical physics. The activity of this new "political economy," according to Kurz, consists of "exploring" capitalist economics with the claim of scientific inquiry; while constantly "proving" its own necessity.

The ethical principle of "the greatest happiness for the greatest number" advocated by Jeremy Bentham promotes a society that grants every individual the right to "pursue their happiness," as also reflected in the phrase "pursuit of happiness" in the United States Declaration of Independence. The objective measure of happiness is ultimately money, and according to Bentham, the right to property must not be infringed in any way.

=== Biologistic Foundation ===
A central development in the 19th century, according to Kurz, is Darwinism, which exhibits a characteristic of modern natural science:

"A truly great discovery became completely fused with an irrational ideological impulse and unreflective interests of the capitalist fetish system, eventually becoming charged with tremendous destructive power".

Kurz sees Darwin as part of the tradition of the Enlightenment and its program of "naturalizing" the world. However, the freethinkers did not have genuine enlightenment in mind: the apparent eradication of religion by the natural sciences was reserved for the intellectual elite or served as a more sophisticated form of mass control and self-discipline.

Darwin believed he had discovered the mechanism for evolution, i.e., the gradual change and higher development of living beings, in the "struggle for existence," i.e., in selection. The retrojection of this doctrine onto society provided a welcome "scientific" justification for the capitalist concept of competition. The so-called "social Darwinism" was soon employed by "imperialist ideologists such as Friedrich Naumann and Walther Rathenau" to formulate German claims to world power.

For Kurz, Darwinism and capitalism are associated with the eugenics movements that sought to develop a "scientific" human "selective breeding." Social Darwinism introduced "negative selection" for eliminating the "biologically inferior" members of society, particularly criminals and those deemed unfit for work in the capitalist sense. This ideology of social Darwinism was initially realized as a form of "reproductive hygiene":

"While the 'inferior' and 'degenerate' were to be prevented from reproducing if necessary by legal means and police violence, it was considered a socio-political goal to bring together 'genetically healthy' human material according to agricultural criteria".

With Darwinism, modern racism also emerged, extending from Kant ("Race") to Hegel and Auguste Comte ("Law of three stages") which led Arthur de Gobineau to invent the myth of the "Aryan master race."

According to Kurz, the merged race theory and Darwinism assumed a directly biologistic character. Houston Stewart Chamberlain supplied an interpretation of "the entire history, including art forms, from 'racial' perspectives". This connection between Darwinism and racial delusion in capitalism led to a dualistic hierarchy between "superior individuals" and biologically inferior "human material". This societal delusion found a projection for the "embodiment of its own negativity" and a negative "superman" in the form of Jews —a development in which Kurz sees the transformation of the European tradition of anti-Semitism into capitalist modernity, especially in the idea of a "Jewish world conspiracy." Kurz saw this in the light of that the logic capital and its "market laws" ultimately only allowed the physical extermination of the "competitor."

Kurz also identifies anti-Semitic tendencies in the socialist tradition, starting with Charles Fourier, whose 1808 work "The Theory of the Four Movements" promoted an anti-Semitic worldview. Pierre-Joseph Proudhon also reduced the concept of "capitalism" to interest-bearing capital from pure moneylenders, so his critique of capitalism was merely an anti-Semitic reinterpretation of this societal form. Marx also tended, in certain aspects, "towards the identification of 'money as such' or 'haggling' with the 'Jewish essence'".

=== Historical analysis ===
==== First Industrial Revolution ====
Establishment of the business management calculations

According to Kurz, the triumph of liberalism over absolutism during the First Industrial Revolution marked a turning point for society. It brought about expansion, civilization, and the widespread adoption of commodity production. The "capitalist self-referential machine" became an unquestioned aspect of life, and bourgeois thinking increasingly focused on organizational and natural sciences, relying heavily on technocratic intelligence. To stay competitive, companies had to continuously develop their productive forces and ensure the marketability of their offerings. This drive for competitiveness resulted in a "location debate" centered around finding the lowest labor wages, while international competition emerged as a form of social coercion.

As time went on, capitalism became seen as a natural part of society. It presented a paradox: while machinery enabled unprecedented labor savings, there was a failure to utilize these advancements for societal welfare and as solutions to social issues. However, there was hope that a "scientific-technological redemption" would eventually come from the machines themselves.

Kurz contends that the capitalist mode of production contains an inherent and unsolvable contradiction. It transforms abstract labor into commodities but continually replaces human labor with technological and scientific means, thereby undermining the very essence of "value creation."

Victims and Revolts

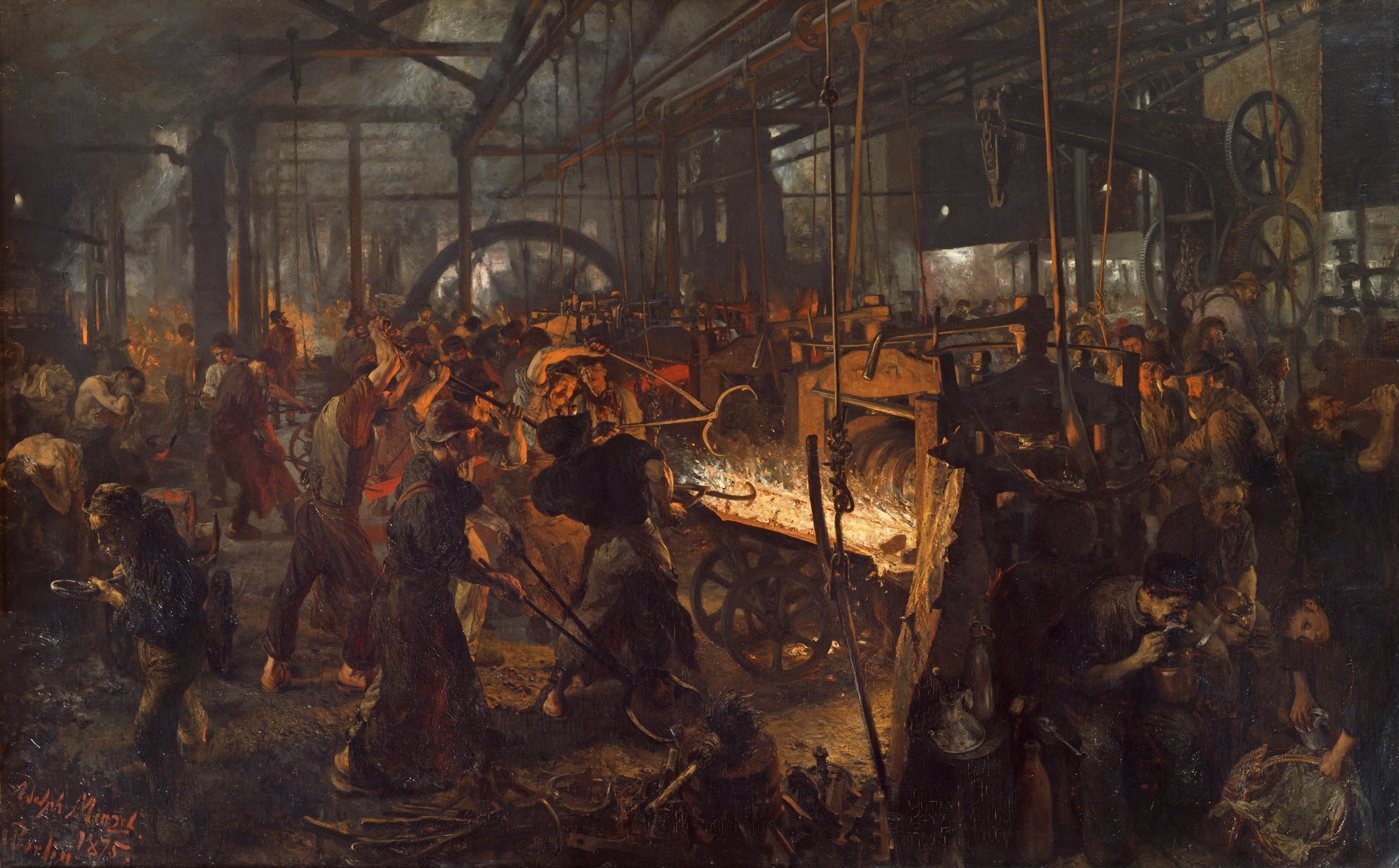
"The 'workplaces' of the First Industrial Revolution were true hellholes" – "The Iron Rolling Mill" by Adolph Menzel (1872–1875)

The consequences of this business calculation at the onset of the First Industrial Revolution resulted in widespread unemployment and the social devastation of entire regions. The emergence of the factory proletariat introduced a new class known as the "working poor," encompassing women and children who toiled in factories for meager wages. However, these victims of circumstance did not passively endure their circumstances; instead, they actively resisted, leading to social revolts.

Kurz identifies the radical and often violent movement of the Luddites as the core of this rebellion. While their approach was rooted in nostalgia, they demanded fundamental and universal conditions for human freedom that were eroded by the capitalist market and factory system. On the continent, instances of "bread riots" primarily occurred during the Vormärz period, where the reality of social warfare and dire circumstances were reduced to peripheral phenomena deemed "necessary" sacrifices for the sake of modernization.

According to Kurz, the introduction of the so-called "population law" proposed by Reverend Thomas Robert Malthus marked the onset of the "biologization" of the social crisis. Malthus posited that human population would perpetually outpace the availability of food resources, offering a kind of "final solution" to account for widespread poverty and unemployment. This elevated the inherent issues of the mode of production based on capital and labour into purported immutable laws of nature.

March Revolution and Social Democracy

Kurz argues that the revolution of 1848, born out of the spirit of nationalism and the search for an "identity-defining construction," had its cause in the goal of liberalism to occupy both the "poles" of the state and the market. The liberal bourgeoisie also fought against the threat of social revolt. Their defeat in the March Revolution played a significant role in forever tying "the emerging Left (later socialism) to the problems of liberalism" and leading it into a long historical dead end.

Modern socialism, according to Kurz, emerged from reformist groups (such as workers' associations) that primarily attempted to prevent or dampen social revolts and attributed the contradictions and restrictions of capitalism to external influences. Only a few intellectuals, most notably Karl Marx and Friedrich Engels, were "converted" through personal experiences. However, historical consequences were lacking. While Marx expressed sympathy for social uprisings, their impulse was mainly seen as a deviation from "the productive forces." Kurz accuses Marxism of adopting the "positivist, techno-scientifically truncated concept of progress of liberalism." A radical critique of the history of modernization and its transformed understanding of labor has been absent in the "Left" to this day.

==== Second Industrial Revolution ====
Until World War II

Kurz characterizes the beginning of the 20th century as a "peculiar schizophrenic mixture of belief in progress and apocalyptic fantasies, technocratic thinking of feasibility and biologist 'veterinary philosophy,' state reason and market competition, individual claims, and delusional collective subjectivity of 'nation' and 'race'."

The traditional social bonds inherited from the agrarian society had been dissolving at an increasingly rapid pace, and the ideas and programs of the socialist labor movement had become both "hollow and incredible as a supposed historical alternative" as they had been fundamentally "contaminated with capitalist forms of thought, patterns of action, and categories of interest."

Kurz considers the First World War, following George F. Kennan, as the "catastrophe of the 20th century." It led to a flourishing of "social democratism" as the Social Democrats, having paid their "blood tax" faithfully, were granted the "long-awaited entry into the centers of power." The marginalized socialist leaders transformed into statesman-like junior partners and became part of the "beautiful machine."

Great Depression and Inflation

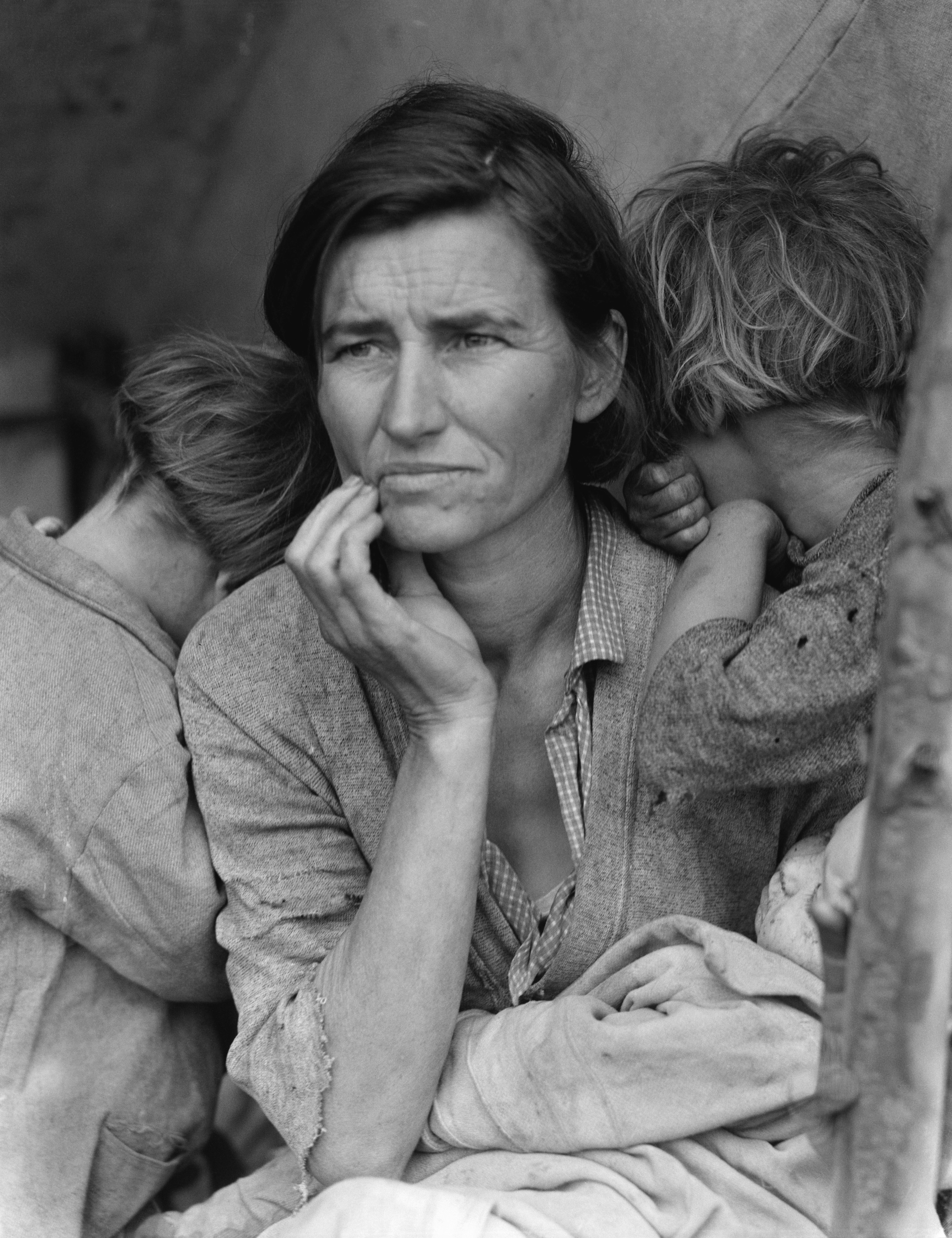
The economic crisis plunged many families into dire poverty – Migrant mother in California, 1936 (Photograph by Dorothea Lange)

In the 1920s, it seemed that a "new era of global capitalism characterized by mass production and mass consumption" was dawning. However, the structural upheaval of the Second Industrial Revolution was overshadowed by the largest "socio-economic crisis of transformation" to that point. Despite the new quality and quantity of mass consumption brought about by the "investive consumption tool" of the automobile, Fordism was unable to seamlessly connect with the First Industrial Revolution. It lacked the necessary infrastructure, required investments, and an intact global market with worldwide sales markets.

Governments attempted to compensate for the war debts by increasing the money supply, leading to a crisis of inflation that disrupted the monetary system across Europe. Kurz sees this as the eruption of the "deep irrationality" of capitalism and the visibility of the "fetishism" of this social system. The impoverished masses were now confronted with an emerging small class of speculative crisis profiteers.

Especially in Germany, the combination of fear of crisis, phantasmagoric projections, and hunting down speculators rekindled the old deep-seated demon of anti-Semitism, particularly in the form of the nazi party.

Speculation and the Crisis of Deflation

Governments managed to suppress inflation through drastic measures. In the end, this development resulted in the states violently discharging their debts with their citizens, leading to a significant increase in impoverishment. The subsequent boom of the so-called "Roaring Twenties" took place primarily in the realm of speculation, leading to an unprecedented wave of speculation in the stock and real estate markets. Numerous "stock artists" joined forces "to drive up the price of a particular stock."

When the bubble of this "fictitious capital" burst in the Wall Street Crash of 1929, it marked the beginning of the largest depression in capitalist history. According to Kurz, the result of this second Great Depression was a "global deflationary shock":

"In the USA, nearly penniless masses roamed the country in their Ford cars, their only remaining possession, searching for odd jobs to earn a little food and gasoline [...]. In addition to these bizarre mobile slums, huge new slums also emerged in the suburbs, which would never completely disappear."

Kurz's conclusion is that the economic crisis caused social standards to regress within a short period of time to the level of the 18th and early 19th centuries.

Dictatorship and Capitalism

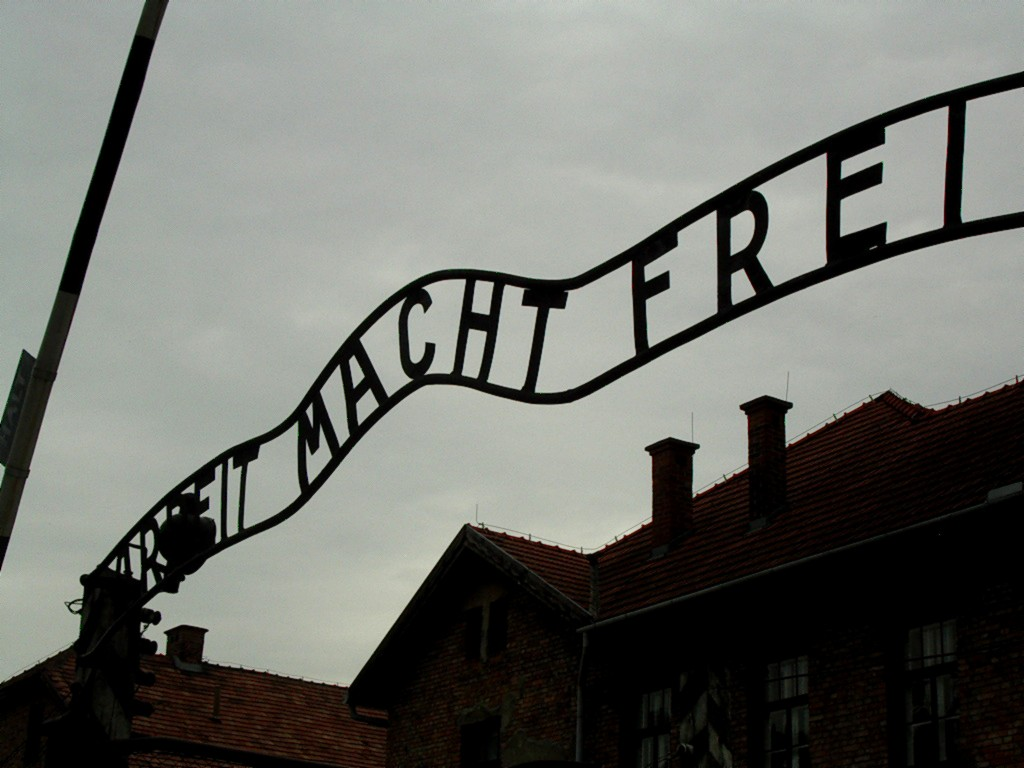
"Arbeit macht frei" – inhumane motto at the entrance gate of Auschwitz concentration camp – for Kurz, the embodiment of the ultimate consequence of "liberal ideology"

Kurz considers it "self-deception" and "historical distortion" when the dictatorships of the 20th century are treated as the absolute "other" and "foreign" in the "bourgeois explanation," representing "what has emerged from the depths of history, embodying the dark, anti-civilizational side of humanity." When examining the entire history of modernization, Kurz argues that it is more appropriate to understand capitalism, liberalism, and market economy democracy not as overarching positives but as "negative and repressive socialization through the monstrous 'beautiful machine' of the 'valorization of value.'"

According to Kurz, the dictatorships of the 20th century are rooted in the capitalist mode of production and are manifestations of liberal capitalism. He further claims:

"From this negative, critical perspective, particularly Auschwitz can only be understood as the ultimate consequence of liberal ideology in the tradition of Hobbes, Mandeville, de Sade, Bentham, Malthus, and others," whose "naturalization and biologization of the social" represent a "historical layer of Auschwitz."

In the dictatorships of the 20th century, "only the liberal terror of early capitalism was repeated at a higher stage of development and with shifted ideological patterns of legitimation."

State Capitalism

Kurz identifies in the history of the Soviet Union a "prototype of state economic 'catch-up modernization' in the 20th century." In his view, the Soviet Union was trapped in a dual "historical predicament":

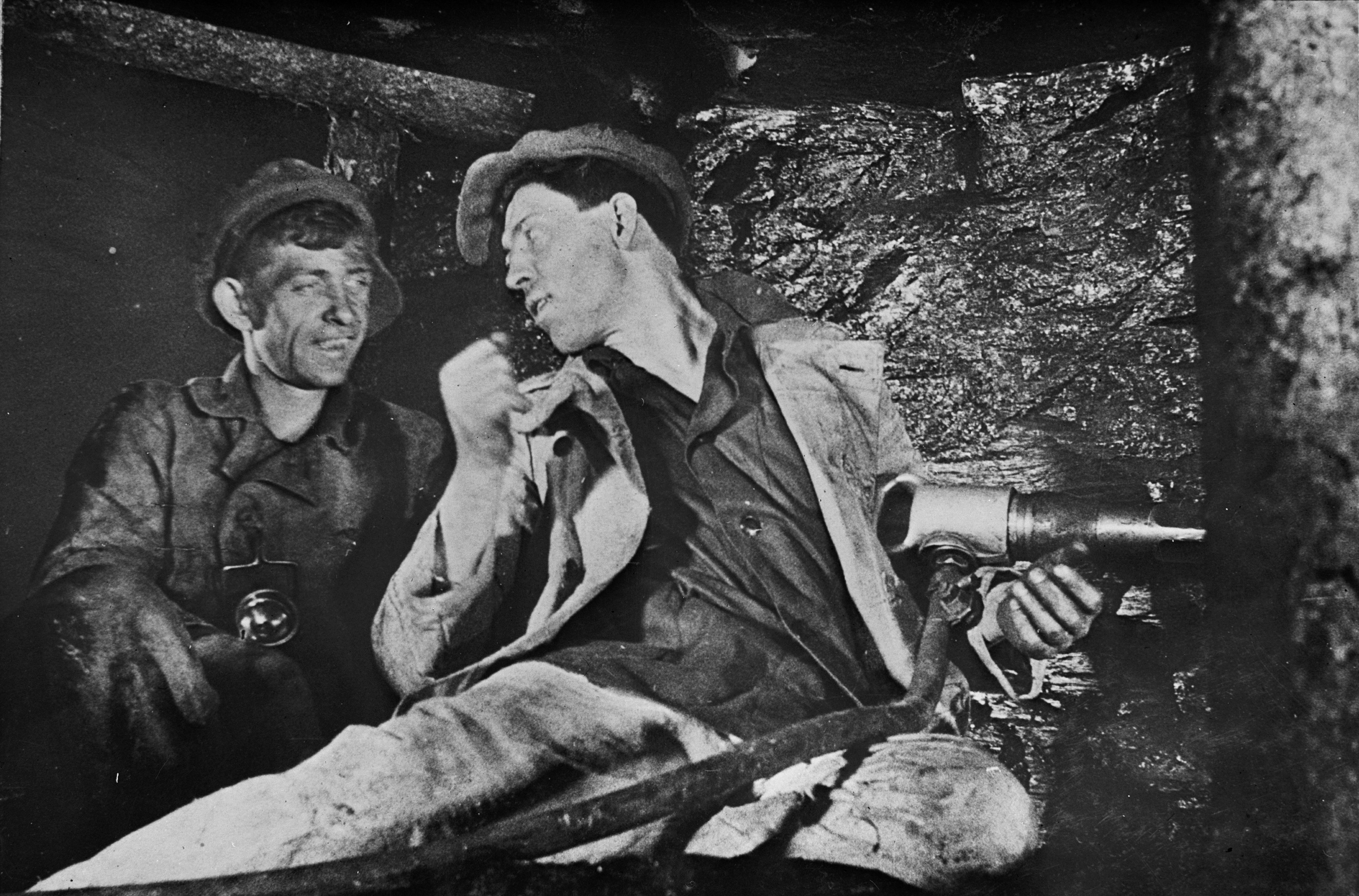
Aleksei Grigorievich Stakhanov with a fellow miner

Faced with the "presence of the capitalist-advanced West," it could no longer embark on a fundamentally different path; even its "world consciousness" had already been shaped by capitalism. It was forced to enter directly at the level of the 20th century, in accordance with the standards set by contemporary capitalism.

Therefore, Kurz argues that the "crimes of communism" were nothing more than a "temporally compressed repetition of early capitalist horrors." The death by starvation of millions in the early 1930s was the result of a rigid industrialization policy aimed at forcibly building (state) capitalist industrial systems, seeking to position themselves at the forefront of global development. However, Kurz notes an "unredeemed aspect" in the "Soviet catch-up modernization," as well as in the ideology of the "labor movement and the Left in general": the "dream" of "free and conscious self-organization," which manifested, albeit briefly, in the concept of the "Soviet" before degenerating into mere props.

Keynes and Keynesianism

According to Kurz, the belief in the "doctrine of the 'invisible hand'" was lost after the Great Depression. This led to a shift towards general state-economic regulation and the recognition of the state as a crucial economic actor. In the United States, the deepest turning point in its economic history came with Roosevelt's New Deal. The state's economic approaches to crisis management were accompanied by the establishment of a more comprehensive logistical framework for the Second Industrial Revolution. In Nazi Germany, state-economic interventions were implemented with even greater vigor than in the New Deal. Kurz achieved the actual "Fordist breakthrough" through the utilization of "financial methods of war economy," effectively pushing back the absolute limit of the "capitalist self-contradiction" once again.

During this period, the British economist John Maynard Keynes developed the theory of "deficit spending." Keynes challenged the previously accepted Say's law, considering it fundamentally flawed. Kurz critically observes that Keynes himself acknowledged that his theory "can essentially only be a 'deferral' of the absolute limit of capitalist production. He unintentionally reveals the absurdity of the logic inherent in the capitalist relationship." The initial phase of Keynesianism led to a resurgence of the arms race, with war once again taking precedence, and Hitler acting as the "executor of this murderous 'ruse'" of deferral.

Kurz sees World War II as a result of this development and he concludes the following:

"This renewed triumph of the 'beautiful machine' cost a total of 55 million lives, and large parts of Europe and Asia were devastated. But strangely enough, the immense 'costs of modernization,' which quantitatively and qualitatively surpassed all the previous terror and horror of capitalism, no longer evoked any intellectual echo of deep shock [...] It was as if the deeply demoralized human material, completely indifferent and already robotically cold, ran through a wall of fire straight into the commercial, finally spiritless numbness of the coming bleak paradise of consumption."

In the post-war period, the goal was to "transform the war economy structures into 'civil-economic' forms of regulation and develop them into a permanent system."

Post-War Period

According to Kurz, after World War II, capitalism seemed to rise like a phoenix from the ashes. It appeared that a "golden age" was truly dawning. This post-war prosperity was a more or less global phenomenon. In Germany, the term "economic miracle" was coined, which, according to Kurz, already expressed the exceptional nature of this development.

Until around 1950, the market was not uniformly capitalist. It was only the "post-war Fordism" that created a "comprehensive production and distribution of all consumer goods by Fordist industrial capital and its 'welfare state,'" almost eliminating the "traditional sectors" (subsistence production, family production, agriculture). This meant that the population as a whole was "more exposed to the capitalist social machine."

"Capitalist Totalitarianism" and Mobilization

Kurz sees the Second Industrial Revolution as fundamentally characterized by the concept of "totalitarianism." He criticizes the prevailing theories of totalitarianism for defining the term "totalitarian" only in a "state-political" sense while completely ignoring the economic aspect, even though political totalitarianism has a basis in economics. Especially due to how "both the Stalinist and Nazi dictatorships, as well as Italian fascism, emerged on the grounds of the commodity-producing system."

In post-war democracies, there is a "total mobilization" evident in the call for "ever-increasing, increasingly senseless consumerism," "performance," and "competition," which particularly affects women through the "industrialization of housework" that causes the double burden of women due to the necessary of working more to be able to afford appliances and their running costs, while still being responsible for domestic work. Furthermore, Kurz perceives mass car traffic as "total automobilization," a state resembling war that has claimed approximately 17 million lives throughout the 20th century. These "human sacrifices" are presented as normal, necessary, and inevitable.

Kurz believes that the notion that capitalism would bring more leisure and fun for humans needs to be relativized in relation to its connection with "reduced working hours." Firstly, this reduction only applied to a few wealthy capitalist centers, especially the countries of continental Western Europe. Secondly, the reduction of working hours was only a temporary phenomenon during a phase of rapid economic growth. Thirdly, the reduction in time was overcompensated by an excessive increase in individual workloads. On the other hand, "leisure" is only "seemingly freely available time" because in "leisure consumption" – such as mass tourism – the "mobilization" extends into free time. Thus, the "capitalist conditioning" continues, leaving no social space outside of it.

Totalitarian Democracy

Kurz believes that even democracy contains a totalitarian element. He argues that Erich Ludendorff recognized that "the human material of the exploitation process can be led on a leash in no other form of government as docilely and inexpensively as in democracy." The reason for this, according to Kurz, is that the social life is not ultimately controlled by the conscious collective decision of democratic society members. The democratic procedures of free speech, political deliberation, and free elections are subordinate to the effects of the "social physics" of anonymous markets. All democratic decisions are already predetermined by the automaticity of the economic system understood as a natural law.

According to Kurz, behind the three branches of government (legislative, executive, and judiciary), there always stands the structural (fourth) power of a totalitarian market system. This market system operates under the name of the abstract "common good," as postulated by Jean-Jacques Rousseau, and does not extend to the proclaimed "popular sovereignty." Another totalitarian characteristic, according to Kurz, is the total bureaucracy of human administration in democracies.

World Destruction and Crisis of Consciousness

At the turning point of economic prosperity in the early 1970s, Kurz argues that the comprehensive destruction of natural foundations of life became visible. He attributes this development to the logic of "abstract labor," which externalizes its costs onto society as a whole, the future, and nature. Friedrich Engels already noticed this in his analysis "The Condition of the Working Class in England." However, it was only with the capitalist "total mobilization" that nature became completely subjected to the logic of abstract business exploitation.

Possible tipping elements in the climate system

In 1972, the "limits to growth" were first debated worldwide following a study by the Club of Rome, which addressed the relationship between the compulsion for growth and natural resources. Kurz criticizes this study for presenting the destructive character of business rationality only indirectly, as an "unfortunate side effect of the 'industrial society.'" Kurz argues that the official society took up the debate on the limits and destructive ecological consequences of growth only to better repress the problem. The real cause of the ecological catastrophe has been talked away without consequences or transformed into the unbinding propaganda of a "reconciliation of economy and ecology."

According to Kurz, it was only through the rebellious student movement that the dream of a world "liberated from the capitalist self-purpose of the 'beautiful machine'" and reducing working hours to perhaps two or three hours per day could be revived. He states that for the first time in many decades, there was an attempt to reformulate Marx's fundamental criticism of capitalism authentically. The May 1968 events seemed to shake the system to its foundations.

However, Kurz concludes that the 1968 movement failed completely in terms of social emancipation. The radical critique of commodity form and "abstract labor" was not pursued further, and both the students and the labor movement fell into the trap of "politics."

==== Third Industrial Revolution ====
Kurz sees the technological basis of the Third Industrial Revolution in electronics and information sciences.

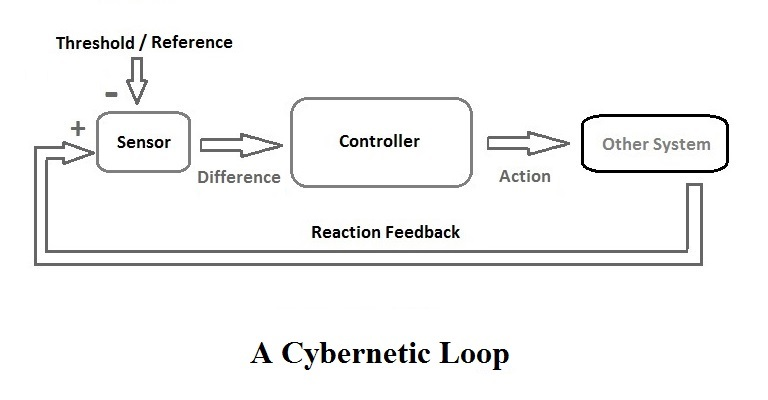
Principle diagram of a cybernetic system with a feedback loop

The associated automation, in his view, leads to a qualitatively new stage of mass unemployment and a systemic crisis. According to Kurz, the logical form of automation in capitalism is mass unemployment. The main problem is that those who are now "redundant" are excluded from the system of earning money and competition, even though it remains their inevitable basis of existence. The "end of the work society" threatens to result in a "real historical system collapse" since the substance of capital itself is running out without labor.

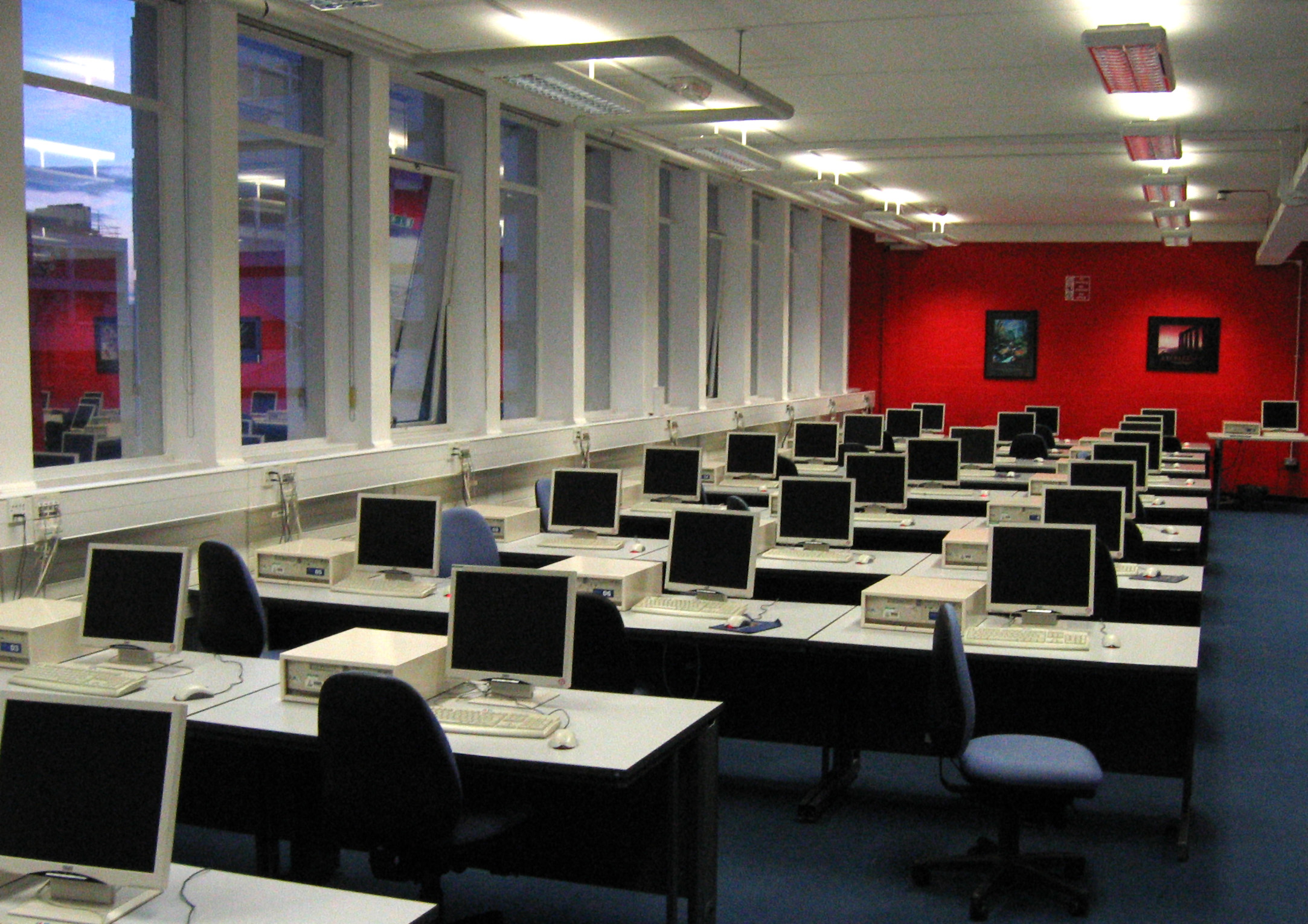
A university computer lab

According to Kurz, two innovations were essential for the Third Industrial Revolution: cybernetics and electronic computing machines. Alongside the rise of the microelectronic revolution after World War II, especially since the 1980s, the "structural mass unemployment" developed:

"Unemployment became structural in the sense that it no longer swelled or diminished in correspondence with the cyclical cycle but grew continuously, regardless of it."

Kurz finds the attempts of contemporary liberalism to solve this problem grotesque. He considers Ralf Dahrendorf's argument to radically lower real wages and social benefits as not only an ineffective solution but also absurd to impose such demands on wage laborers. Kurz believes that the "only reasonable way of dealing with this" is to demand more leisure for everyone in line with technological progress, with full participation of all in the fruits of the tremendously increased productivity.

Kurz sees a "democratic Gulag" looming with the progressive dehumanization of capitalism. He divides this Gulag into three sections:

- The first section consists of the incarceration and confinement of people. Institutions where more and more "superfluous," "delinquent," or otherwise "unusable" individuals disappear, which themselves have become a tremendous cost factor: prisons, penitentiaries, disciplinary institutions, various types of "homes," poor clinics, psychiatric asylums, etc.
- The second and largest section consists of the masses of unemployed and marginalized individuals, bureaucratically kept in motion, harassed, humiliated, and increasingly placed on "rationed hunger."
- The third section consists of the "vegetating" homeless, street children, immigrants, asylum seekers, and other illegal persons who are no longer continuously administered but are sporadic subjects of police and occasionally even military operations (or, in some countries, private death squads).

Kurz's conclusion is that the Third Industrial Revolution has brought about the greatest crisis since 1929 in just under 20 years. It not only revived the seemingly overcome mass unemployment but also caused the collapse of the monetary economy in many countries. Here, the inherent self-contradiction of capitalism is finally revealed.

=== Social Consequences ===
==== Situation in the Nation-State ====
Founder's Era and Founder's Crash

The result of the wave of stock speculation in the German Empire after 1850 was the great "Founder's Crash" in 1873. As a result, the galloping industrialization entered a gradual stagnation for nearly two decades until the early 90s.

Kurz sees an inherent logic of "industrial capitalism" in the return to protectionist tariffs and increasing state activity (also known as Wagner's Law). This logic demands logistical structures that "cannot be operated according to the laws of purely business rationality." However, since the state, in the conservative-liberal understanding, could no longer be a profit-producing "entrepreneur" itself, a "financial problem" emerged for its growing tasks in the industrial market economy. The only solution lay in moderate taxation of "market income" and increasing indebtedness.

Welfare State

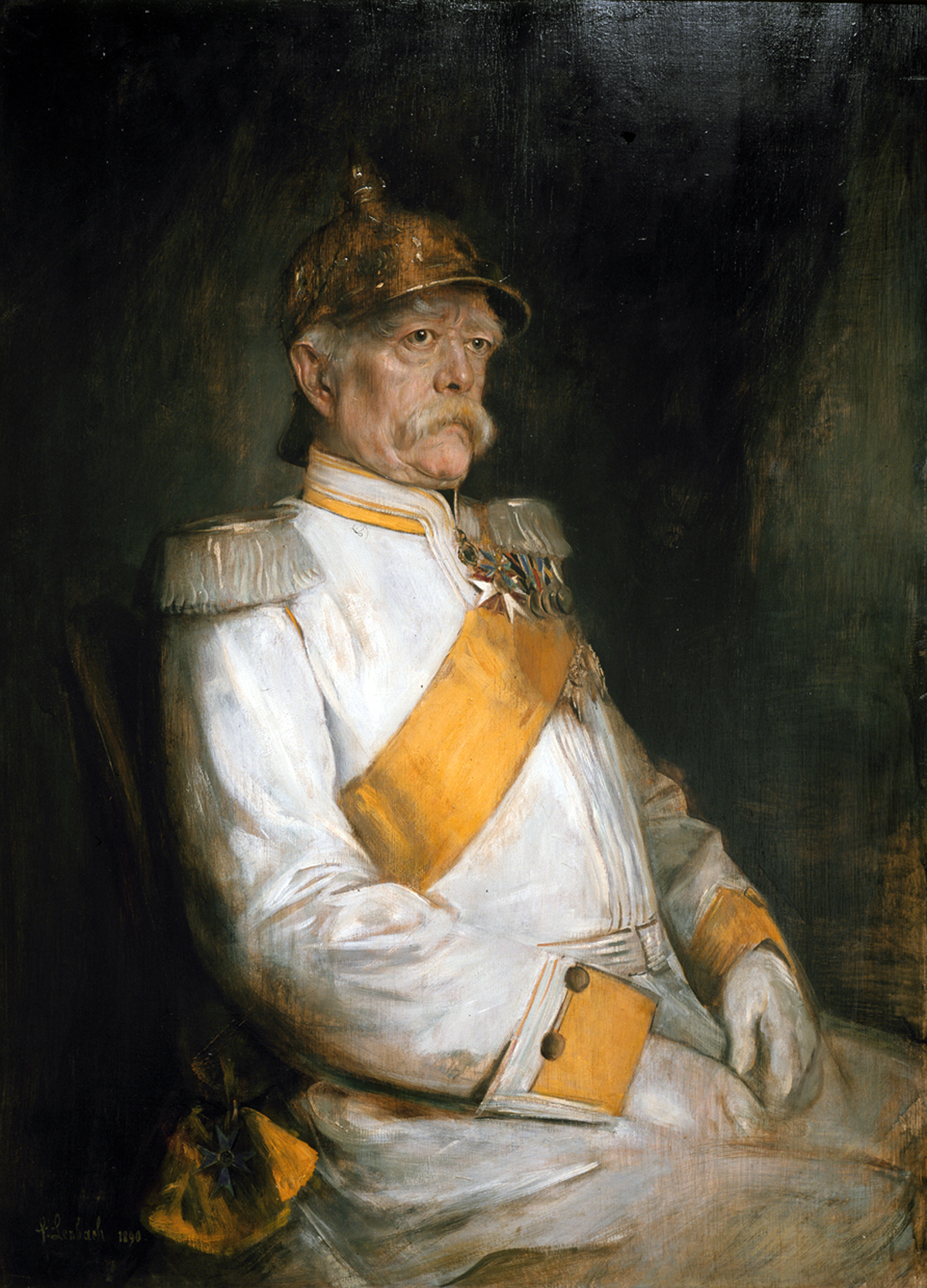
Franz von Lenbach's portrait of Bismarck in his 75th year.

Liberal conservatism was inclined to prevent social revolts by "assigning a certain social responsibility to the state – of course [...] inseparably mixed and connected with its repressive function." Kurz refers to this as the "remarriage" of liberalism with the "absolutist apparatus" that had taken place in all major European countries.

According to Kurz, Otto von Bismarck pursued a double strategy guided by power politics in his social legislation: the "pure natural law of the market" was supposed to be supplemented by a "state-managed social system": "Parallel to the pressure of prohibition in the old Leviathan style, his government, in a 'classic' manner, took seriously the paternalistic social welfare considerations of liberal conservatism and brought about a kind of 'white revolution' from above in social legislation, which was to become the prototype of the modern welfare state in the 20th century."

Kurz doubts an actual improvement of the social situation through Bismarck's social legislation, which, in his view, only "normalized" mass poverty and prevented solidarity among wage laborers. It was precisely in this situation that, in his opinion, social democracy, which originated from liberalism, grew into a social force. Since the workers of the next generation had no memory of pre-industrial conditions, the ultimate goal of the socialist state had shifted to a "distant and unreal future."

==== Present and Future ====
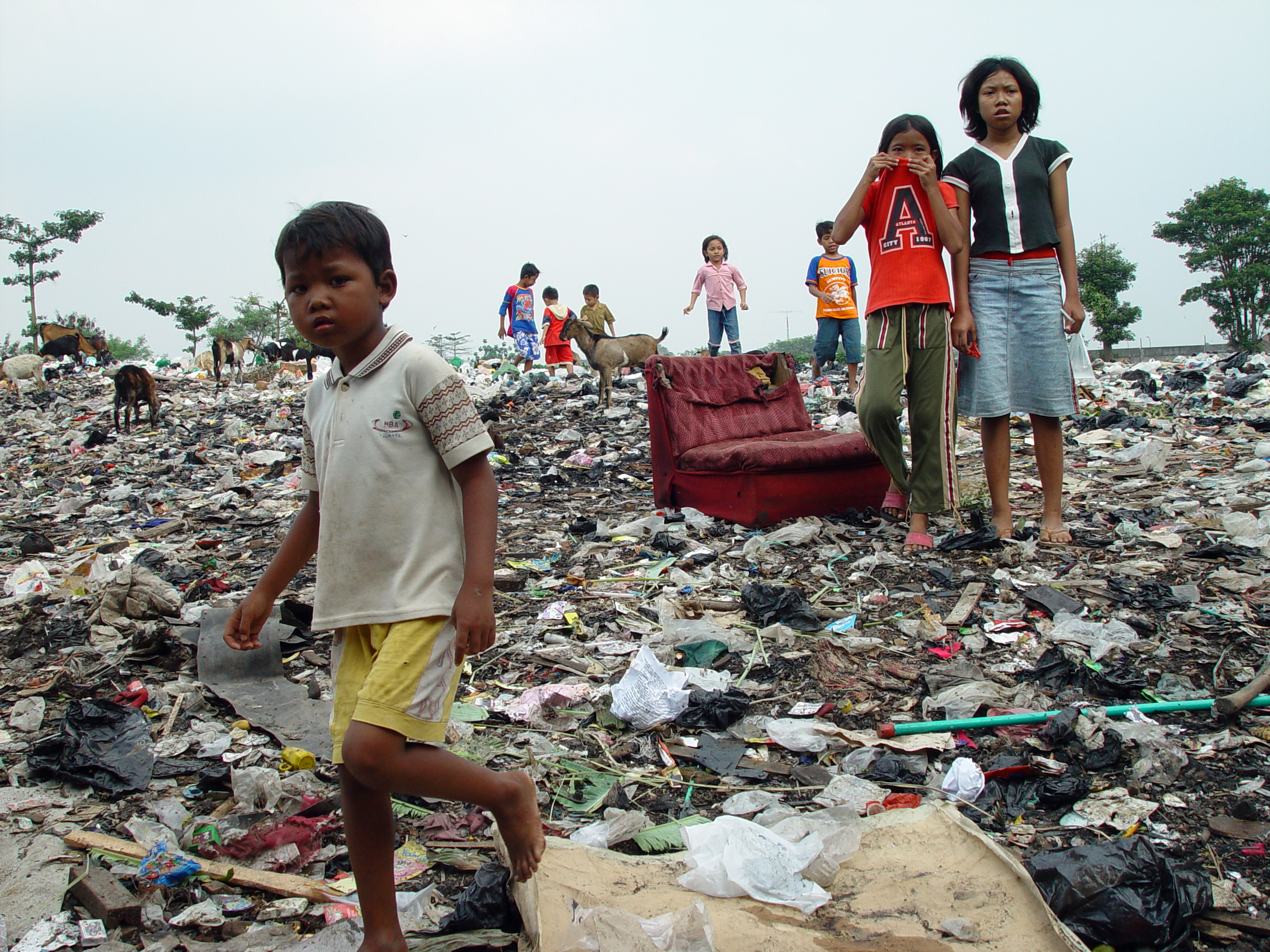
Life in and from prosperity waste – children in misery in a slum on a garbage dump in Jakarta (2004)

According to Kurz, the economic crises of the last two decades of the 20th century, accompanied by the state's retreat from social responsibility and the rise of neoliberalism, have led to the greatest wave of mass impoverishment since the early 19th century. The majority of the Third World has been completely ruined, including the emerging Southeast Asian countries, as well as the states of the former Soviet Union and Eastern Europe. But even in the West, larger regions and population groups are falling into mass impoverishment every year. Kurz concludes that the global capitalist system has completely failed.

Kurz illustrates the phenomenon of impoverishment with various examples. There is a growing impoverishment of children worldwide: child labor is increasing in the Third World, as well as in Germany and the USA; the phenomenon of street children has also expanded massively. Since the 1990s, there has also been a global increase in hunger. Malnutrition and related deficiencies are also increasing in Western industrialized countries. In healthcare, statutory health insurances are being transformed into "poverty funds" everywhere. Beyond the major industrialized nations, medical assistance is now only available for cash payment in most Eastern and Southern countries. Increasingly, "financial poverty is even exploited to exploit the poor as literal organ banks for the better-off," for which the "Third World ruined by the world market" would be a perfect fit – according to Kurz, the "last imaginable stage of the supply economy." The general "dehumanization of capitalist medicine and healthcare" continues especially in how dependent elderly people are treated. Even close relatives often have the status of distant relatives once they disappear behind the walls of a nursing or care facility. Under increasing cost pressure, nursing homes are taking on a "concentration camp-like character" for the impoverished masses.

=== Author's Conclusion ===
In the epilogue of the book, Kurz draws the conclusion that capitalism is heading towards its own self-destruction, which could also result in the destruction of human society. To counter this danger, "radical theoretical critique and rebellion must come together." Kurz sees two possible paths to overcome the capitalist social system: the shortest path would be "the occupation of production plants, administrative institutions, and social facilities by a mass movement that directly appropriates the social powers and operates the entire reproduction under its own control, thus disempowering and abolishing the existing 'vertical' institutions." Another possibility would be a "transition phase in which a kind of counter-society is formed that opens up certain social spaces against capitalist logic, from which the market and the state are expelled." As a possible institutional structure of the future that could "replace market economy and democracy," he envisions the establishment of "councils," i.e., "consultative assemblies of all members of society at all levels of social reproduction." For this purpose, a conscious "culture of palaver" would have to be created to "discuss and weigh everything."

Kurz identifies three main tasks for such a future society:

- "To use the existing resources of natural substances, means of production, and human capabilities in a way that ensures a good, enjoyable life free from poverty and hunger for all people."
- "To stop the catastrophic misdirection of resources [...] into senseless pyramid projects and destructive productions."
- "To translate the greatly expanded social time fund resulting from the productive forces of microelectronics into an equally large leisure for everyone."

According to Kurz, solving these problems ultimately "is not a material, technical, or organizational problem, but solely a question of consciousness." However, Kurz believes that the necessary "leap in consciousness" is unlikely to occur. Nevertheless, capitalism is not viable, which will lead to the "unstoppable decivilization of the world." The only alternative for action is "a culture of refusal." This means "refusing any responsibility for 'market economy and democracy,' only doing 'what is required,' and sabotaging the capitalist system wherever possible."

== Reception ==
Kurz's provocative and commercially successful book has received significant attention. After its publication, the book sparked a controversial debate in daily and weekly newspapers. The reception included sharply critical voices, while positive voices mainly welcomed Kurz's approach of radical criticism of the economic system. Critical authors, on the other hand, accused him of fundamental methodological flaws, distortions (including historical ones), and advocating a misguided rebellion, as well as lacking practical consequences.

The project's "impressive and radical critique of the capitalist world system" is described in the Frankfurter Rundschau as a "bold endeavor" during a time of "social taboos surrounding criticism of capitalism." The positive contribution in a "controversial" discussion in Die Zeit considers Kurz's book to be "the most important publication of the last ten years in Germany." The detailed approach is also praised. The WOZ welcomes the "wealth of material." Despite shortcomings, the Frankfurter Rundschau agrees with Kurz's "time-critical diagnosis of a hardening of capitalist consciousness." The Zeit's overall very positive review sees the book as "a great achievement, a truly necessary protest," and highlights one of its key insights that "there have only ever been relatively short periods in which expanding capitalism produced something like mass prosperity, and that only in Western Europe, Anglo-America, and Japan."

On the opposing side, Kurz's argumentation basis was heavily criticized. The use of 'capitalism' is problematic, as the Süddeutsche Zeitung and a critical article in Die Zeit agree that Kurz fails to define the term and uses it indiscriminately as a "battle term" and claims that capitalism is to blame for everything. The SZ also points out that Kurz overlooks other factors that are often considered causative, particularly in Africa, and attributes them to the undifferentiated concept of capitalism. The SZ diagnoses a misguided approach, stating that Kurz fails to address why capitalism has become dominant and disregards how the errors and defects of capitalism can be corrected or mitigated through political action. As well as critical acclaim, the book has also been reviewed as being "militant and scandalous" by German political scientist Ralf Altenhof.

Kurz's work has also encountered sharp opposition from a stalinist standpoint. With an article in the journal GegenStandpunkt criticizes Kurz's approach. The article concludes that Kurz's critique of capitalism is a "tickling of methodical opposition without claim and with an explicit renunciation of theoretical criticism and practical consequences."

== Editions ==
Robert Kurz: Schwarzbuch Kapitalismus. Ein Abgesang auf die Marktwirtschaft. 1st–4th edition, Ullstein-TB 36308, Munich/Berlin 2001–2005, ISBN 978-3-548-36308-0; expanded new edition: Eichborn, Frankfurt am Main 2009, ISBN 978-3-8218-7316-9 (Download exit-online.org (PDF; 2.4 MB) 257 pages. 2nd edition, Ullstein, Munich 2002).

== See also ==
- Criticism of capitalism
- Le Livre noir du capitalisme
- Le Livre noir du colonialisme
