= Tomasz Konicz =

German author and journalist

Tomasz Konicz (born 1973 in Olsztyn, Poland) is an author and journalist.

== Work ==
Konicz studied history and philosophy in Hanover, as well as economic history in Posen. As a journalist, he regularly writes for, among other publications, Telepolis, Neues Deutschland, konkret, Exit!, Streifzüge, and Hintergrund. Konicz was also editor-in-chief of the journal Telepolis. Konicz covers political economy, crises, and conspiratorial thinking. Konicz writes in the tradition of Wertkritik and the World-systems theory.

== Publications ==
- Politik in der Krisenfalle (Telepolis): Kapitalismus am Scheideweg, 2012, Heise, ISBN 978-3-936931-82-2.
- Krisenideologie – Wahn und Wirklichkeit spätkapitalistischer Krisenverarbeitung, 2013, Heise, ISBN 978-3-944099-15-6.
- Aufstieg und Zerfall des Deutschen Europa, 2015, ISBN 978-3-89771-591-2.
- Kapitalkollaps – Die finale Krise der Weltwirtschaft, 2. Auflage 2016, ISBN 978-3-930786-80-0.
- Faschismus im 21. Jahrhundert. Skizzen der drohenden Barbarei. Heise Medien, 2018. ISBN 978-3-95788-174-8.
- Klimakiller Kapital. Wie ein Wirtschaftssystem unsere Lebensgrundlagen zerstört. Mandelbaum Verlag, Wien 2020, ISBN 978-3-85476-692-6.
