= Roberto Schwarz =

Brazilian literary critic

Roberto Schwarz (August 20, 1938) is a Brazilian literary critic, essayist, and professor. He is best known for his works on literary theory and cultural criticism.

A professor at the Faculty of Philosophy, Languages and Human Sciences of the University of São Paulo and at the State University of Campinas, he was awarded the Prêmio Jabuti in 1978 for the book Ao Vencedor as Batatas, an analysis of the formation of the novel as a literary genre in Brazil and of the writings and life of Machado de Assis.

== Biography ==
Born in Vienna into a Jewish family of intellectuals, Schwarz emigrated with his family to Brazil in 1939, fleeing Nazism. He befriended Anatol Rosenfeld, whose lectures on art and philosophy Schwarz attended and who encouraged him to pursue higher education. In 1960, he graduated in social sciences from the University of São Paulo, where he took part in a group of Marxist studies which included Fernando Novais, Paul Singer, Octavio Ianni, Ruth Cardoso, Fernando Henrique Cardoso, Michael Lowy, and Francisco Weffort.

He completed his master's degree at Yale University, where he studied under René Wellek. With the installation of the military dictatorship in Brazil, Schwarz moved to Paris, where he completed his doctorate on Latin-American studies under the orientation of Raymond Cantel. Influenced by the Frankfurt School, he wrote on authors such as Franz Kafka, Bertolt Brecht, and Robert Kurz. Among the Brazilian authors he studied are Oswald de Andrade, Francisco Alvim, and Paulo Emiíio Sales Gomes. Schwarz also wrote plays and poems.
