= Novais =

Novais may refer to:

== People ==
- Abílio Novais (born 1967), Portuguese football player and manager
- Fernando Novais (1933–2026), Brazilian historian, researcher, academic and writer
- João Novais (born 1993), Portuguese footballer
- Paulo Dias de Novais (c.1510–1589), Portuguese explorer and colonial administrator
- Walace de Sousa Novais (born 1993), Brazilian footballer

== Places ==
- Novais, Brazil, São Paulo, Brazil
- Novais, Portugal, a parish in the municipality of Vila Nova de Famalicão
