= Exit! =

German theoretical magazine

- Categories: Social criticism
- Publisher: Zu Klampen Verlag
- Country: Germany
- Language: German
- Website: www.exit-online.org

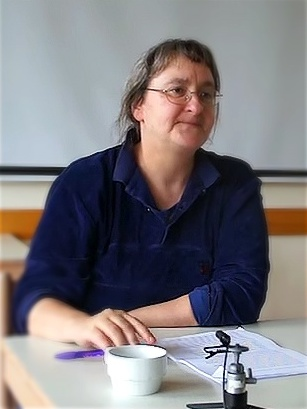
Scholz (Philosopher)

EXIT! (or alternatively: Exit!) is a German magazine of social criticism, and discussion group formed in 2004. The magazine is published by the publishing house Zu Klampen Verlag. The magazine has a value-critical (German: Wertkritik) approach, both to the contemporary mode of production, and its critique of traditional marxism, as well as their critique of political economy.

EXIT! thereby subjects "abstract labour" and its expressions of value, commodity, money and market to a categorical critique. The value dissociation criticism (German: Wertabspaltungskritik) of the philosopher Roswitha Scholz occupies a large space in the magazine.

== Content and influence ==
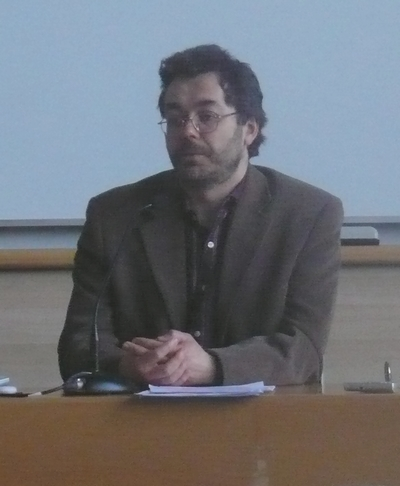
Jappe (philosopher)

A few of the subjects that the magazine addresses are critiques of economics, anti-politics, critique of traditional Marxism (Weltanschauungsmarxismus; English: Worldview Marxism), crisis ideologies and critique of ideologies, the end of modernization, critique of anti-German ideology, critique of work and abstract time, critique of the Enlightenment & Human Rights Ideology, critique of capitalism as the theology of modernity, postmodern subjectivity, democracy and anti-Semitism, populism and "the false immediacy of the left". But big data, and criticism of monetary value theory, and a range of other topics has also been covered.

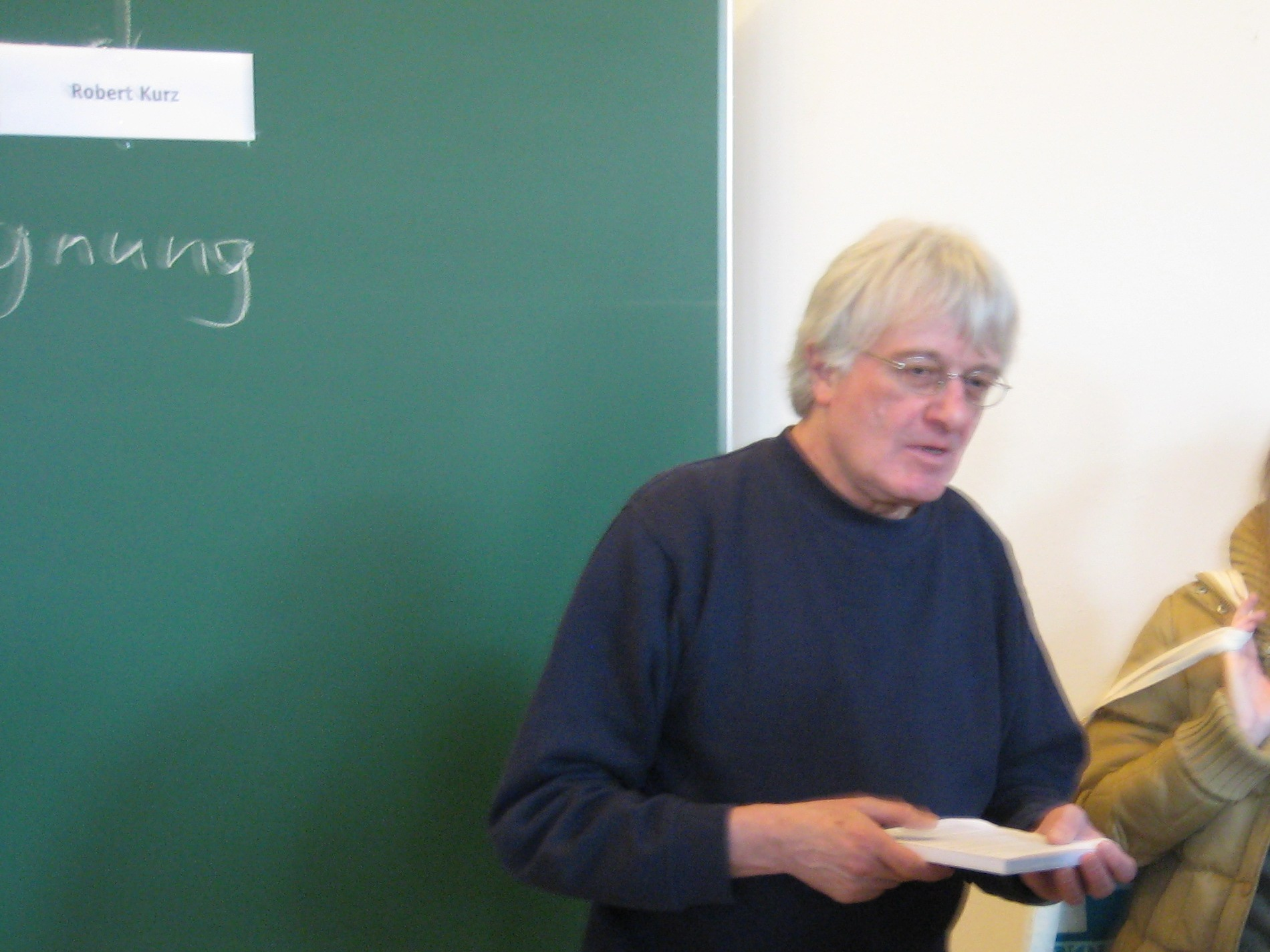
Kurz (Philosopher)

Some of the authors featured in the magazine include Robert Kurz, Roswitha Scholz, Claus Peter Ortlieb, Tomasz Konicz, Anselm Jappe etc. The magazine originated in the German speaking world, but have had all the more influence internationally due to translations to Chinese, Japanese, Portuguese, French, Spanish, and others. There has also been a rather rich translation of the works of the EXIT! group, with 15 languages being covered only on their own site. There has been a especially high amount of translation specifically to Portuguese and Spanish with several scholars and institutions adopting the theories of EXIT! in Brazil.

== History ==
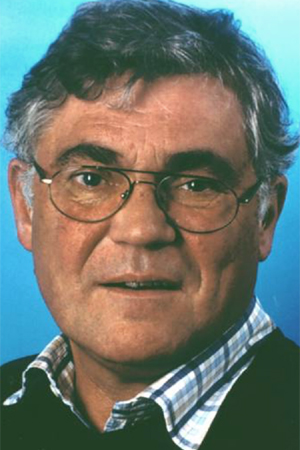
Claus Peter Ortlieb (mathematician)

The group Exit! emerged from a split in the Krisis group. Krisis was founded by the philosopher Robert Kurz and others in 1986. Kurz was to become its most active and prominent author, and the group were to become instrumental in the development of value dissociation criticism. Before the split of the group occurred in 2004, Kurz had already managed to publish his seminal work Schwarzbuch Kapitalismus, which Die Zeit had proclaimed one of the most important publications of the decade. However, when the group split, Robert Kurz ended up co-founding the new group with the name of Exit!. According to those who would become involved in Exit!, the split was the result of a putsch by a minority of the editorial staff of Krisis. But those who remained with Krisis claimed that it had to do with personal reasons between the members. A few members of EXIT! published a communiqué stating among other facts, that a theoretical conflict had developed due to Kurz critical engagements with anti-Germans. They noted that the majority of the old editorial board from Krisis would start a new project, that was to become EXIT! They also stated that they wanted to keep developing theory that was free of "an ideology of the pro-western ¡hurrah!", as well as expressed an aim to "we want to offer to the rising social movements a useful critical-solidary reference, instead of the pattern of "left populist" and anti-Semitic thought".

== See also ==
- Commodity fetishism
- Critique of political economy
- Moishe Postone
- Robert Kurz
- The tendency of the rate of profit to fall
- Wertkritik
