= Krisis (journal) =

Krisis: Journal for Contemporary Philosophy
- Discipline: Philosophy
- Language: English, Dutch

Publication details
- History: 1980–present
- Publisher: University of Groningen Press (The Netherlands)
- Frequency: Quarterly
- Open access: Yes
- License: CC BY-NC 3.0

Standard abbreviations
- ISO 4: Krisis

Indexing
- ISSN: 0168-275X
- OCLC no.: 70220380

Links
- Journal homepage; Online issues

Krisis is a peer-reviewed open-access academic journal covering mainly continental contemporary philosophy, publishing articles in both Dutch and English. The focus of Krisis is in the field of social, cultural, and political thought, featuring articles that show the relevance of classical thinkers for contemporary problems. In recent decades, Krisis increasingly published original contributions in the political and social philosophy, cultural theory, philosophy of science and technology, and (partly born in the Netherlands) empirical philosophy.
