= Manifesto Against Work =

Manifesto critical of work by the group Krisis

Manifesto Against Work is a manifesto critical of work written by the authors who were active in the journal Krisis a group that had the German philosopher Robert Kurz as one of its main contributors. The Manifesto Against Work emerged during the time in which the New Labour ideology spread across Europe in the late 1990s.

The writing is based on the thesis that the work-society has come to an end, but that this end is paradoxically accompanied by an increased radicalisation of waged work and the social phenomena related to it. In recent years, work has increasingly taken the form of an "irrational end in itself". The manifesto critiques both the prevailing principle that unemployment is due to personal weaknesses such as a lack of willingness to work or excessive demands, and a personalised criticism of managers or politicians. In addition to the phenomena of neoliberalism such as wage dumping and the sorting out of people who do not meet the demands of this ideology, on the other hand, the anti-neoliberal left, which is fixed on a reactionary attitude towards the days of the welfare state, is also criticised for maintaining the paradigm of waged work as meaningful. Work is thus described as a social phenomenon whose logic permeates and increasingly determines social life. In contrast to weltanschaaungsmarxismus, the value-critical writing takes up the very dependence and not the "opposition of capital and work". The manifesto argues against the notion of class struggle as the motor of history. According to Krisis, there is no class-subject, and the struggle between the proletariat and the bourgeoisie is not a struggle between a revolutionary class and its oppressor, but rather a struggle between two opposed interests that are integral to contemporary society, and form a single "work camp". Accordingly, the working class cannot be the subject of emancipatory change either. Since the historical role of the workers movement is also focused on a realisation of work, rather than the abolishing of it. So contrary to the given notion in modernity, they assert that the struggle against capital is not the struggle for the liberation of work, but rather a struggle for liberation from work.

== Content ==
1. The rule of dead work - This section summarises how contemporary society seem obsessed with work as an end in itself activity. The manifesto starts off with the formulation: "A corpse rules society – the corpse of work. All powers around the globe formed an alliance to defend its rule: the Pope and the World Bank, Tony Blair and Jörg Haider, trade unions and entrepreneurs, German ecologists and French socialists. They don't know but one slogan: jobs, jobs, jobs!" The section further introduces crisis theory, and claims that contemporary society manages its social darwinism by referring to the "so-called "laws of the market economy".
2. The neo-liberal apartheid society - This section theoretically outlines what would happen if the sale of the commodity known as "waged work" become the exception instead of the rule. The Krisis group claim that such a situation would result in social apartheid, highlights the working poor, and dismisses the idea of being able to "work your way up" with the formulation - "Those who left behind their brain on the coat rack may dream of working their way up to the position of a service industry millionaire." As well as theorises regarding the future of "the service industry".
3. The neo-welfare-apartheid-state - Section three highlights the so-called neo-welfare-apartheid-states (anachronistic) fixation on the postwar era in what's called the state-run work-simulation. Where the state is supposed to make sure that people are engaged in waged work, by means of job programmes, compulsory work for people on welfare, subsidies, public debt etc. They also state that "The so-called activating workfare does even not spare persons who suffer from chronic disease or single mothers with little children. Recipients of social benefits are released from this administrative stranglehold only as soon as the nameplate is tied to their toe (i.e. in mortuary). The only reason for such state-obtrusiveness is to discourage as many people as possible from claiming benefits at all by displaying dreadful instruments of torture – any miserable job must appear comparatively pleasant."
4. Exaggeration and denial of the work religion - This section traces the historical sources of what the Krisis gruppe claimed is "work fanaticism". Noting that: "Socialists and conservatives, democrats and fascists fought each other to the death, but despite all deadly hatred, they always paid homage to the work idol together. "Push the idler aside", is a line from the German lyrics of the international working [...] class anthem; " work makes free" it resounds eerily from the inscription above the gate in Auschwitz." they thereafter claim that during the end of the 20th century, all differences in political theory vanished, and that the uncritical dogma of merciless work was all that remained as the "natural destiny of human beings".
5. Work is a coercive social principle - Section five makes some distinctions regarding what's claimed to be true, as well as false transhistorical claims regarding human activity. As well as touches upon the subject of the temporality in modernity, i.e Newtonian time. Which they claim "Even children are drilled to obey". Further they address that the social reproduction process doesn't differentiate between what is actually produced, as long as something is produced. Hence it doesn't matter "Whether houses are built or landmines are produced". The section then introduces a more sociological argument where "dead work", i.e. "capital", is treated as a reified metaphysical madness which holds this society captive.
6. Work and capital are the two sides of the same coin - This section goes over the joint interest which renders all other questions superfluous to work-society except how as much work power can utilised as it is an end in itself. As well as addresses the indifference ruling powers can show when people are impoverished in the midst of affluence.
7. Work is patriarchal rule - Section seven covers how the work society couldn't commodify aspects of care, and reproduction of the workforce within a logic of newtonian time. This led to a separation from the sphere of work, where the sphere of home life, family life, and intimacy came into being. The section also traces historical aspects of contemporary patriarchy.
8. Work is the service of humans in bondage - This section traces the etymology of the word arbeit (German), labour, laborare (Latin:staggering under a heavy burden) and trabajo, (Latin: tripalium) which they claim is "according to its root, is not a synonym for self-determined human activity, but refers to an unfortunate social fate."
9. The bloody history of work - Section nine historicises how "[t]he imposition to waste the most of one's lifetime under abstract systemic orders was not always as internalised as today." And claims that: "it took several centuries of brute force and violence on a large scale to literally torture people into the unconditional service of the work idol." They also emphasise the role of the state and taxes in forcing people to start engaging in waged work.
10. The working class movement was a movement for work - Section ten historicizes how the class movement was a movement to realise work rather than to do away with it.
11. The crisis of work - This section theorises regarding that the third industrial revolution have made work society all the more anachronistic, and touches upon topics such as globalisation.
12. The end of politics - This section highlights how the crisis of work entails a crisis for the state, and for politics. They argue that this is the case due to the fact that the state "owes its career to the fact that the commodity producing system is in need of an overarching authority guaranteeing the general preconditions of competition, the general legal foundations, and the preconditions for the valorisation process"
13. The casino-capitalist simulation of work society - Section thirteen argues that the current casino-capitalist simulation of work society is largely castles in the air. Which they claim also is true for the economy itself. They argue that "Present-time work employed is replaced by the tapping of future-time work that will never be employed in reality – capital accumulation taking place in some fictitious future II so to speak." They also argue that "Industrial corporations show profits that don't come from operating income, i.e. the production and sale of goods – a loss-making branch of business for a long time – but from the "clever" speculation of their financial departments in stocks and currency."
14. Work can not be redefined - This section opens up with stating that: "After centuries of domestication, the modern human being can not even imagine a life without work. As a social imperative, work not only dominates the sphere of the economy in the narrow sense, but also pervades social existence as a whole, creeping into everyday life and deep under the skin of everybody. "Free time", a prison term in its literal meaning, is spent to consume commodities in order to increase (future) sales.". The section goes on to critique how the modern human is so socialised into the notion of the primacy of work that essentially all activity becomes transformed into activities that increasingly resemble work. The section also claims that work can't simply be redefined.
15. The crisis of opposing interests - Section fifteen claims that the old forms of solidarity is rendered obsolete in the contemporary era due to a situation of general de-solidarity. As they stated it in the text:"The uncompromising de-solidarity is not restricted to the internal conflicts in companies or the rivalry between various trade unions. As all the functional categories of the work society in crisis fanatically insist on the logic immanent in the system, that is, that the well-being of humans has to be a mere by-product or side effect of capital valorisation, nowadays basically any conflict is governed by the "St. Florian-principle". (German saying/prayer: "Holy St. Florian, please spare my home. Instead of that you may set on fire the homes in my neighbourhood". St. Florian is the patron saint of fire protection.) All lobbyists know the rules and play the game. Any penny received by the clients of a competing faction is a loss. Any cut in social security payments to the detriment of others may improve one's own prospect of a further period of grace. Thus the old-age pensioner becomes the natural adversary of all social security contributors, the sick person turns into the enemy of health insurance policy holders, and the hatred of "native citizens" is unleashed on immigrants."
16. The abolition of work - This section claims that work "For all its predominance, [...] never succeeded in completely wiping out the disgust at the constraints brought about by this form of social mediation. Apart from all the forms of regressive fundamentalism, the competition complex at the heart of social Darwinism in particular, a potential for protest and resistance does still exist." They claim that it is necessary to "think the unthinkable".
17. A programme on the abolishment of work directed against the enthusiasts of work - Section seventeen oppose criticisms likely to face critics of work, such as being accused of being nothing but dreamers. The section therefore goes over the consequences of the status quo. Where e.g. "billions of humans are ostracised and can consider themselves lucky when they can survive on waste dumps". As well as critique the way of life in the global north, where people are "isolating themselves and numbing their minds by exposing themselves to a constant stream of dreary "entertainment". Or that the "fact that the world is made a desert currently just to breed more money out of money" (referring to the climate crisis). As well as rejecting the thought that this can be seen as something that "works". The section also attacks the notion that work is any natural state of human beings, with the phrases: "Your conceit rests on your ignorance and the weakness of your memory. In justification of your present and future crimes, you rely on the disastrous state of the world as brought about by your earlier crimes. It slipped your mind – actually you suppressed all memory of it – that the state was obliged to commit mass murder to drum your false "law of nature" into people until it became their second nature to consider it a privilege to be employed under the orders of the system idol who drains their life energy for the absurd end-in-itself." The section also further engages in anticipated reactions from those who believe in work as an end in itself. As well as further criticises work society for its wastefulness.
18. The struggle against work is anti-politics - The last section of the manifesto claims that while the prospects today may seem bleek to society generally, this is a reason why the critique of work is so urgently needed. They claim that this can't be done through a political party, due to the fact that the whole point of politics is "to seize power (i.e. to become "the administration") and to carry on with work society." They claim that this is the reason that the opponents of work "don't want to take the control centres of power, but want to switch them off. They claim that their policy is "anti-politics". And the reason they give for this is that State and politics are inseparably intertwined in modernity, and hence have to disappear side by side. The very end of the last section states: Freedom neither means to be the human raw material of the markets, nor does it mean to be the dressage horse of state administration. Freedom means that human beings organise their social relations on their own without the intervention and mediation of an alienated apparatus. According to this spirit, the opponents of work want to create new forms of social movement and want to occupy bridgeheads for a reproduction of life beyond work. It is now a question of combining a counter-social practice with the offensive refusal of work. May the ruling powers call us fools because we risk the break with their irrational compulsory system! We have nothing to lose but the prospect of a catastrophe that humanity is currently heading for with the executives of the prevailing order at the helm. We can win a world beyond work. Workers of all countries, call it a day!
