= Roswitha Scholz =

German journalist, writer and feminist theorist

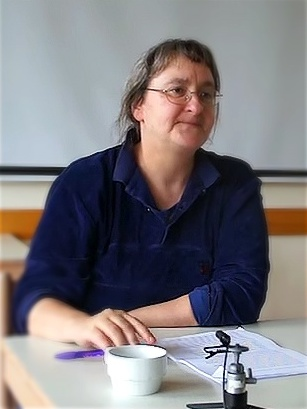
Roswitha Scholz (2014)

Roswitha Scholz is a philosopher and a social theorist. She works as an editor for EXIT! journal, which she co-founded in 2004, after participating in the Krisis group and magazine (founded in 1986 in Nuremberg by the philosopher Robert Kurz, Ernst Lohoff, Klaus Braunwarth and Udo Winkel).

Inspired by the social theory of Theodor W. Adorno, she revolutionized the theoretical current of value criticism in 1992 with her article Value is the male (Der Wert ist der Mann) which contained theses on socialization in relationship to the value form and the relationship between the sexes. The text initiated the theoretical current of value dissociation criticism, which enriched the field of value criticism with the feminist question, as well as transformed it in terms of both content and method.

She is committed to theorizing a question that remains, in her view, "an unsolved problem" in feminism, the internal link between capitalism and modern patriarchy and its metamorphoses, and tries to theorize a move beyond feminisms of equality, differancé, deconstructionism, materialism, ecofeminisms and "class struggle" feminisms.

Her writings broadly focus on racism, anti-Romanyism, the critique of ideology, feminism, epistemology, critical theory, Marxism and gender relations in modernity. Her work has had an international impact in academia internationally. But with relatively very few interactions with the anglophone world. As well as in various progressive circles.

== Selected bibliography ==
- Scholz, Roswitha (2000). Das Geschlecht des Kapitalismus. Feministische Theorie und die postmoderne Metamorphose des Patriarchats. Horlemann, B, Unkel, ISBN 3-89502-100-8.
- Scholz, Roswitha (2005). Differenzen der Krise - Krise der Differenzen. Die neue Gesellschaftskritik im globalen Zeitalter und der Zusammenhang von "Rasse", Klasse, Geschlecht und postmoderner Individualisierung. Horlemann, B., Unkel, ISBN 3-89502-195-4.
- Scholz, Roswitha (2013). Patriarchy and Commodity Society: Gender without the Body. Mediations 27 (1–2).
- Scholz, Roswitha (2008). It’s the Class, Stupid? (Some parts originally from “Überflüssig sein und Mittelschichtsangst: Exit! No. 5.)

Logo of Krisis, a journal Scholz was involved in starting which she later left together with Robert Kurz

== See also ==
- Anselm Jappe
- EXIT!
- Critique of political economy
- Guy Debord
- Krisis
- Robert Kurz
- Silvia Federici
