= Fernando Novais =

Brazilian historian, researcher and writer (1933–2026)

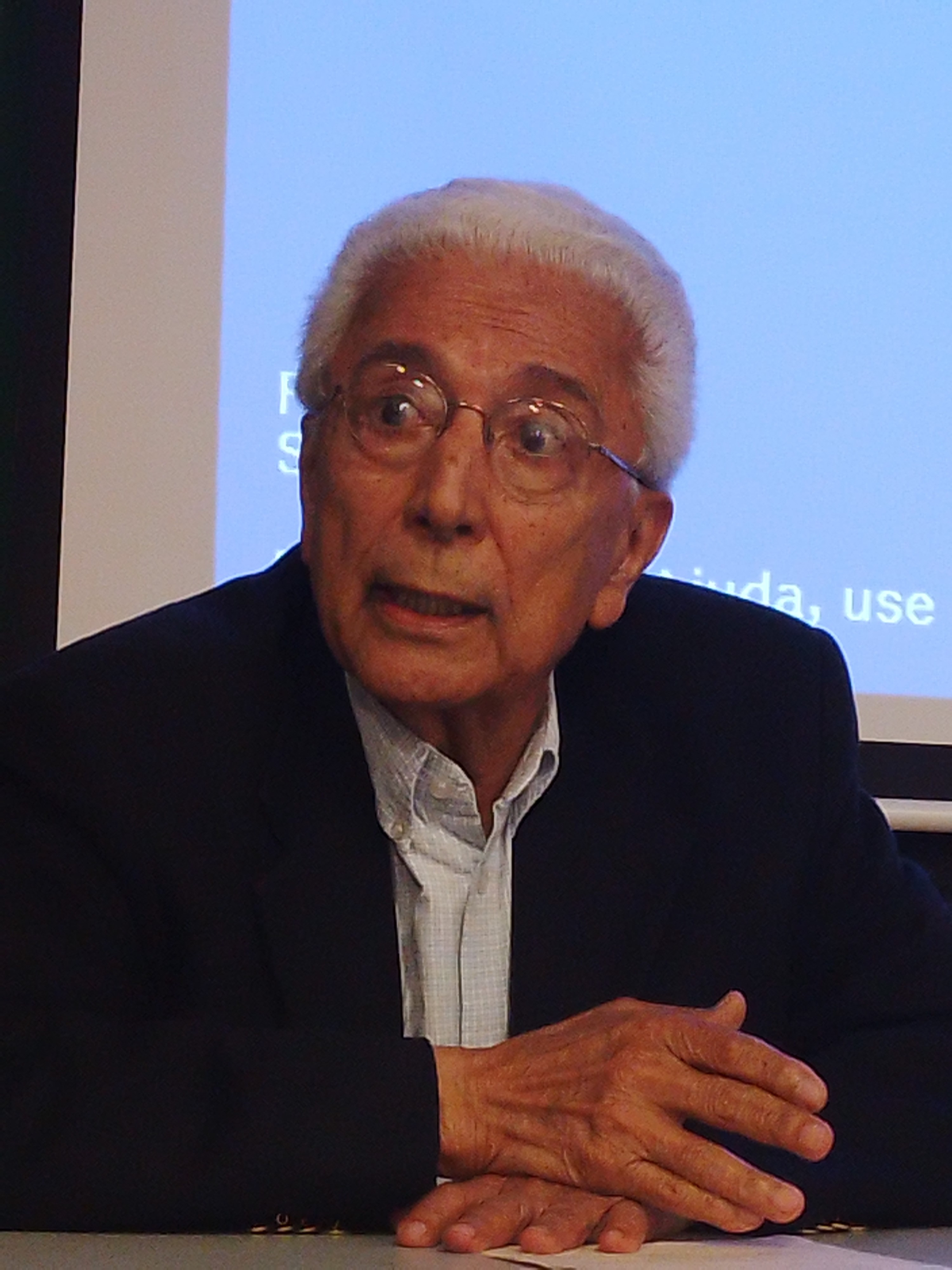
- Novais in 2022
- Born: 30 September 1933; Guararema, São Paulo, Brazil
- Died: 30 April 2026 (aged 92); São Paulo, Brazil
- Education: University of São Paulo (Bachelor's and Doctorate)
- Scientific career
- Fields: History
- Workplaces: University of São Paulo; University of Campinas
- Thesis: Portugal e Brasil na Crise do Antigo Sistema Colonial (1777–1808) (1965)
- Doctoral advisor: Eduardo d'Oliveira França

Fernando Antônio Novais (30 September 1933 – 30 April 2026) was a Brazilian historian, researcher, academic and writer. He was a Professor Emeritus at the University of São Paulo (USP) and a professor at the University of Campinas.

== Background ==
Novais was born in Guararema, a town in the interior of São Paulo, in 1933. His father, a school principal, was transferred to the town of Colina, where Fernando lived until he was seven years old. The family then moved to São José do Rio Preto. At 15, Fernando moved to the capital, São Paulo, studying the classical course at Roosevelt College. A lover of books and the humanities, he was greatly inspired by his history teacher to pursue a career in the field.

In 1958 he graduated in History from the Faculty of Philosophy, Letters and Human Sciences (FFLCH). During his history course, his greatest influence came from Professor Eduardo d'Oliveira França, who would become his doctoral advisor.

At the same institution, in 1961 he began what would become his doctorate thesis, Portugal e Brasil na crise do Antigo Sistema Colonial (1777–1808), defended in 1973, a work that became a reference in the field.

Novais died on 30 April 2026, at the age of 92.

== Career ==
Novais assumed the chair of modern and contemporary history, and taught at the Faculty of Philosophy, Letters and Human Sciences at USP from 1961 to 1985. After more than two decades of work at the University of São Paulo, Novais moved to Campinas, in the interior of São Paulo. The year after his departure from USP, he migrated to the Institute of Economics (IE) linked to the State University of Campinas (UNICAMP). He remained at the institution until 2003. After leaving Unicamp, he joined the faculty of the Faculdades de Campinas (FACAMP).

In 1996 he published, in collaboration with Carlos Guilherme Mota, A independência política do Brasil. He was the general organizer of the collection História da vida privada no Brasil, released in four volumes by publisher Companhia das Letras in 1997, which brought together works by renowned contemporary Brazilian historians and is considered one of the main classics of Brazilian historiography.

He taught at the University of Texas twice and participated in various debates and seminars at other American universities, such as Columbia University and the University of California.

In France he taught courses at the Institut des Hautes Études de l'Amérique Latine, linked to the University of Paris III (Sorbonne Nouvelle); in Belgium, at the UCLouvain; and, in Portugal, at the universities of Coimbra and Lisbon, where he lived for a year while conducting research for his doctoral thesis.

== Major work ==
The most impactful historiographical work of Fernando Novais is his doctoral thesis, Portugal e Brasil na crise do Antigo Sistema Colonial (1777–1808), defended in 1973. Due to its innovative nature in analyzing colonial trade and administration in its most intricate aspects, it laid the groundwork for a new understanding of the relations between Metropolis and Colony.

The work, seen as a classic that changed historiography in the country, Portugal e Brasil na Crise do Antigo Sistema Colonial continues to generate debate among historians; by analyzing Portuguese colonization in Brazil, Novais expands the interpretation of Caio Prado Júnior in Formação do Brasil Contemporâneo. Caio Prado viewed colonization as a 'chapter' of commercial capitalism's expansion, while Novais related it to the very process of forming this capitalism and the transformations experienced at the center of the system.

With the reformulation of basic history education curricula in the 1980s, Novais' interpretation of the colonial system crisis reigned hegemonically in textbooks for about two decades; until some challenges began to arise, especially from a group of historians from Rio de Janeiro. One of the main books contesting Novais is "O antigo regime nos trópicos: a dinâmica imperial portuguesa (séculos XVI-XVIII)”, by João Fragoso (Joao Luis Ribeiro Fragoso), Maria Fernanda Bicalho (Maria Fernanda Baptista Bicalho), and Maria de Fátima Gouvêa (Maria de Fatima Silva Gouvea), published in 2001, which questions the fact that the complexity of social hierarchies did not receive due attention in Novais' work.

== Disciples ==
Novais taught for about four decades in higher education institutions, having trained at least two generations of historians, followers of the "novaisista school". Among the main disciples of historian Fernando Novais are Laura de Mello e Souza, a professor at the University of Paris (Sorbonne), and Pedro Luís Puntoni, a professor at the State University of São Paulo (USP).

== Books ==
- Portugal e Brasil na Crise do Antigo Sistema Colonial (1777–1808) (2nd ed., 2019, Ed. 34), Editora HUCITEC.1979.
- História da Vida Privada no Brasil – Cotidiano e Vida Privada na América Portuguesa, Companhia das Letras, launched in 1997 and re-released in 2019.
- Aproximações, Estudos de História e Historiografia, Cosac Naify, 2005.

== Awards ==
In December 2010 he was awarded the commendation of the Order of Ipiranga by the Government of the State of São Paulo. At the ceremony, the honor was presented by the then-governor of São Paulo, Alberto Goldman (PSDB).
