= Robert Kurz =

German philosopher (1943–2012)

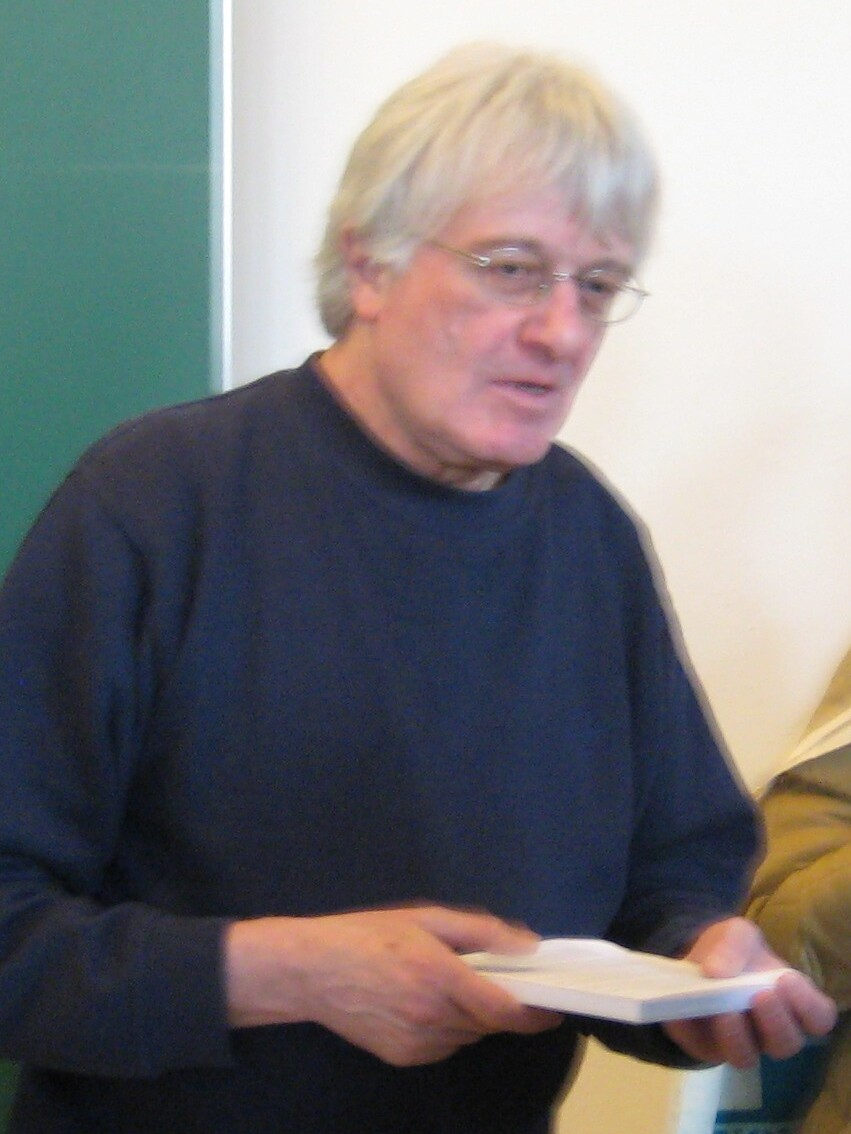
Kurz on an ATTAC-congress in 2009

Robert Kurz (24 December 1943 – 18 July 2012) was a German philosopher, social critic, journalist and editor of the journal Exit!. He was one of Germany's most prominent theorists of value criticism.

== Life and work ==
Robert Kurz was born on 24 December 1943 in Nuremberg to a German working-class family. During his military service, he was involved in pacifist propaganda and participated in the "Ostermärschen," protest marches against atomic weapons in the 1960s. Kurz studied philosophy, history and paedagogy at the University of Erlangen without taking a degree. He participated in the "student revolt" in 1968 and took part in the intense discussions within the New Left. He was a member of the Communist Workers Union of Germany, which was later named the Marxist–Leninist Party of Germany) during the 1970s, but then quit because of his critique of the leadership. He then multiplied the meetings in view of a renewal of the critical theory, which became concrete in the 1980s with the first attempts of the current of which he was to be the principal founder and theorist, the "critique of value" (Wertkritik).

Starting in the 1980s, Kurz developed a fundamental critique of the basic forms of socialization in the modern world - based on the question of the structural causes of the inefficient Eastern bloc economy. He turned against the uncritical affirmation of the concept of labor by the Marxist workers' movement. His book Der Kollaps der Modernisierung (The Collapse of Modernization), published by Eichborn-Verlag in 1991, unfolds a theory of the collapse of modern world society, which assumes that, due to rationalization processes, wage labor is gradually disappearing and that the system as a whole is heading toward a "barbaric end." As in his later works, Kurz offers an outlook on a society that is no longer based on money-mediated commodity exchange. In order to overcome the crisis, he argues, a "sensual reason" is indispensable that is capable of seeing and using things outside their historically conditioned commodity character. As well as a categorical critique of the ontological categories of modernity.

Kurz was a co-founder of the magazine Marxistische Kritik (Marxist Critique) in 1986 and participated in the creation of the Krisis group, around which Wertkritik concept was developed. Until April 2004 Kurz was co-editor of the journal Krisis. Then, the Krisis group split into two, and Kurz and several others formed a new group, EXIT! (along with the magazine of the same name). Both sides presented the causes of the split differently: While the Krisis editorial team, which continued under this name after the split, cited Kurz's style of communication, which they found hard to bear, as the cause of the split, the latter and Roswitha Scholz accused the "rest of Krisis," which they called "putschists," of using formal legal means to "seize power" in the editorial team. Documentation of the splitting process as well as the structural and personnel background can be found on the website of Exit! as well as on that of Krisis.

In the book Die antideutsche Ideologie (The Anti-German Ideology), Robert Kurz deliberately polemically confronted what he called the "ideology-critical reductionism" of the Berlin magazine Bahamas. In the course of the inner-left controversy over the Iraq war, Bahamas had spoken out in favor of U.S. intervention. Kurz then accused the so-called "anti-Germans" of militant affirmation of Enlightenment ideals, "Western values," and Bellicism.

Robert Kurz distinguished himself through a radical critique of the "labor and class struggle fetish" of traditional (labor movement) Marxism. The critique of value, which he was instrumental in conceiving, is directed against a sociologically truncated understanding of relations of domination, i.e. against deriving relations of domination exclusively from social relations. Kurz sees in the social role of value (value-socialization) a totalitarian tautology that subordinates ad infinitum the entire physical and social-symbolic world to a single abstract principle of form: the accumulation of "dead labor." Kurz's critical analysis of the "totalitarian" socialization principles of modernity crystallizes in his concept of commodity fetishism.

Later, the "dissociation theorem" developed by EXIT! editor and philosopher Roswitha Scholz, to whom Kurz was married, occupied an increasingly broad space in Kurz's conception of theory. This synthesis of the early value critique as well as the post-feminist postulate of a structural difference between the genders currently goes by the name of the "critique of value-dissociation."

Robert Kurz's best-known publication is Schwarzbuch Kapitalismus, published in 1999. (The book was originally meant to have been published as Satanic Mills). The weekly newspaper Die Zeit published two controversial reviews, one of which called the Schwarzbuch "the most important publication of the last 10 years."

A regular contributor to important newspapers, notably in Brazil, and a renowned lecturer, Robert Kurz chose to stay out of universities and other institutions of knowledge, and chose to live a marginal life by working as a proletarian - notably as a cab driver for seven years and above all as a night worker in a print shop for the packaging of the local newspaper. In the daily newspaper Neues Deutschland, Kurz regularly wrote articles in the column Kurz, Nick, Luft & Hickel. This was assigned to the economics department. The other authors involved were Harry Nick, Christa Luft and Rudolf Hickel. He also published regularly in the weekly newspaper Freitag and the Brazilian daily Folha de S. Paulo. He was a member of the PEN Center Germany.

He died in Nuremberg as a result of complications caused by a surgical error.

== Selected bibliography ==
=== Author ===
- The Collapse of Modernization: From the collapse of barracks socialism to the crisis of the world economy (1991) ISBN 3-8218-4421-3
- Honecker's Revenge: On the political economy of the reunified Germany (1991) ISBN 3-923118-62-7
- Potemkin's Return: Dummy capitalism and distribution war in Germany (1993) ISBN 3-923118-28-7
- The Last One Turns Off the Light: On the crisis of democracy and market economy (1993) ISBN 3-923118-88-0
- The World as Will and Design: Postmodernism, lifestyle Left and the aestheticization of the crisis (1999) ISBN 3-89320-024-X
- The Black Book of Capitalism: A Farewell to the Market Economy (1999) ISBN 3-8218-0491-2
- Read Marx: The most important texts of Karl Marx for the 21st Century (2000) ISBN 3-8218-1644-9
- World Order War: The End of Sovereignty and the changes of imperialism in the era of globalization (2003) ISBN 3-89502-149-0
- The Anti-German Ideology (2003) ISBN 3-89771-426-4
- Bloody Reason: Essays for emancipatory critique of capitalist modernity and its Western values (2004) ISBN 3-89502-182-2
- The World Capital: Globalization and internal barriers of modern commodity-producing system (2005) ISBN 3-89320-085-1
- Money Without Value: Plans to transform the critique of political economy (2012) ISBN 978-3-89502-343-9
- The Substance of Capital (2004-2005), (English ed. Chronos publications ISBN 9780995609501) (French ed.ISBN 9782373090598) (Spanish ed. ISBN 9788412218244)

== See also ==
- Exit!
- Krisis (German magazine)
- Manifesto Against Work
- Moishe Postone
