= Krisis (magazine) =

German magazine

Krisis is an anti-political German political magazine and discussion group (Krisis-Gruppe, or Crisis Group) formed in 1986 as a "theoretical forum for a radical critique of capitalist society." Its members (before split) includes Robert Kurz, Roswitha Scholz, Nobert Trenkle, Ernst Lohoff, Achim Bellgart and Franz Schandl.

== History ==
The Krisis Group was founded in 1986 in Nuremberg, by German left-wing radical intellectuals and activists influenced by the work of Karl Marx and Theodor Adorno. Its leading members included Robert Kurz, Roswitha Scholz, Ernst Lohoff, Norbert Trenkle and Claus-Peter Ortlieb. The group published the theoretical journal Krisis : Contribution to a Critique of Commodity Society, and the review Marxist Critique. The Krisis Group also organized seminars and debates, and published articles in different European and South American reviews.

== Theory ==
In its magazine, the group proposes a critique of contemporary capitalist society based on a fundamental reinterpretation of Marx's analysis of labor, the commodity, value, and money in Das Kapital.

Krisis argues that a distinction exists between an « exoteric » and « esoteric » analysis of capitalism in Marx's writings. Marx's "exoteric" analysis (associated with his early works) is a critique of capitalism from the point of view of labor or the working-class, a point of view which leads inevitably to an emphasis on the struggle between capitalists and workers, and redistribution of wealth, as the aim of class struggle. Marx's "esoteric" analysis of capitalism, on the other hand, is a critique of the historically specific form that work and wealth assume in capitalism – abstract labor and value. Moreover, it identifies domination in capitalism with these historically determinant forms, rather than with the classes or individuals who appropriate surplus labor and wealth from the laboring classes.

In the Manifesto Against Work (translated to english as manifesto against labour due to the original german only using the word arbeit), The manifesto argues against the notion of class struggle as the motor of history. According to Krisis, there is no class-subject, and the struggle between the proletariat and the bourgeoisie is not a struggle between a revolutionary class and its oppressor, but rather a struggle between two opposed interests that are integral to contemporary society, and form a single "work camp". Contrary to the given notion in modernity, Krisis, then asserts that the struggle against capital is not the struggle for the liberation of work, but rather a struggle for liberation from work.

== Krisis division ==
In 2004 the Krisis Group split, and the members Robert Kurz and Roswitha Scholz together with several members of the editorial staff formed the journal Exit! group. According to them, the split was the result of a putsch by a minority of the editorial staff of Krisis. A few members of EXIT! published a communiqué stating among other facts, that a theoretical conflict had developed due to Kurz critical engagements with anti-Germans. They noted that the majority of the old editorial board from Krisis would start a new project, that was to become EXIT!.

== See also ==
- Commodity fetishism
- EXIT!
- Moishe Postone
- Value criticism
